= List of near-Earth potentially hazardous objects =

This is a list of possibly hazardous near-Earth objects with Torino scale rankings that are non-zero or that were, at one time, non-zero. This means that they are, or were once, potentially hazardous objects with respect to Earth.

== Torino scale ==
Graphical representation of the Torino scale. The sizes are approximate. Energy is in TNT equivalent.

The Torino scale is a method for categorizing the impact hazard associated with near-Earth objects (NEOs) such as asteroids and comets. It is intended as a communication tool for astronomers and the public to assess the seriousness of collision predictions, by combining probability statistics and known kinetic damage potentials into a single threat value. The Palermo scale is a similar, but more complex scale.

Near-Earth objects with a Torino scale of 1 are discovered several times a year, and may last a few weeks until they have a longer observation arc that eliminates any possibility of a collision. The only objects on the Torino scale that have ever ranked higher are asteroids 99942 Apophis, which had a rating of 4 for four days in late 2004, the highest recorded rating; (144898) 2004 VD17, with a historical rating of 2 from February to May 2006; and 2024 YR4, with a rating of 3 from January 27, 2025 to February 20, 2025.

== Potential impacts with high ratings ==
In March 2002, (163132) 2002 CU11 became the first asteroid with a temporarily positive rating on the Torino Scale, with about a 1 in 9,300 chance of an impact in 2049. Additional observations reduced the estimated risk to zero, and the asteroid was removed from the Sentry Risk Table in April 2002.

Most potential impacts listed on NASA's Sentry List Table or ESA's Risk List have a Torino scale rating of 0, a few each year reach a rating of 1. As of February 2025, only three objects ever received a rating above 1.

On December 24, 2004, 370 m (1,210 ft) asteroid 99942 Apophis was assigned a 4 on the Torino scale, the highest rating given to date, for an impact in April 2029. As observations were collected over the next three days, the calculated chance of impact first increased to as high as 2.7%, then fell back to zero. The risk of impact during later close approaches was eliminated and Apophis was removed from the Sentry Risk Table in February 2021.

In February 2006, (144898) 2004 VD17, having a diameter around 300 metres, was assigned a Torino Scale rating of 2 due to a close encounter predicted for May 4, 2102. After additional observations allowed increasingly precise predictions, the Torino rating was lowered first to 1 in May 2006, then to 0 in October 2006, and the asteroid was removed from the Sentry Risk Table entirely in February 2008.

In late January 2025, 55 m (180 ft) asteroid 2024 YR4 was assigned a Torino scale rating of 3, and had a chance of impact as high as 3.1% on December 22, 2032. Astronomers responded by scheduling more observations (including the James Webb Space Telescope) as the object receded and got dimmer, to determine its orbit with more precision and thus improve the impact risk prediction. Had 2024 YR4 been confirmed to be on collision course with Earth, its Torino scale value would have been upgraded to 8. The DART mission has proven the capability of redirecting small asteroids, and currently active launch vehicles are sufficient to redirect 2024 YR4 if it had been determined necessary during 2028. However, it was downgraded to a Torino Scale rating of 0 on February 23, 2025.

As of 27 December 2025, on NASA's Sentry Risk Table, two asteroids have a cumulative Palermo scale value above −2: (29075) 1950 DA (−0.93) and 101955 Bennu (−1.40). Four have cumulative Palermo scale values between −2 and −3: 2008 JL3 (−2.38), 1979 XB (−2.69), 2000 SG344 (−2.77) and 2010 RF12 (−2.97). Of the 32 that have a cumulative Palermo scale value between −3 and −4, two were discovered in 2024 and three in 2025: 2025 LK (−3.40), 2024 JW16 (−3.63), 2024 TK5 (−3.63), 2025 DT2 (−3.79) and 2025 YH5 (−3.82).

As of 27 December 2025, on the Risk List maintained by the Near-Earth Object Coordination Centre of the European Space Agency (ESA), one asteroid has a cumulative Palermo scale value above −2: 101955 Bennu (−1.41). Five have cumulative Palermo scale values between −2 and −3: 1950 DA (−2.13), 2023 VD3 (−2.67), 1979 XB (−2.70), 2008 JL_{3} (−2.73) and 2000 SG_{344} (−2.77). Of the 27 that have a cumulative Palermo scale value between −3 and −4, three were discovered in 2024 and three in 2025: 2025 LK (−3.45), 2024 RF10 (−3.51), 2024 JW16 (−3.53), 2024 TK5 (−3.74), 2025 BA1 (−3.82) and 2025 YH5 (−3.96).

Historic cumulative Palermo ratings above −1 in NASA's Sentry Risk Table
Asteroid	Peak hazard			Hazard as of 10 April 2025		
Asteroid	Palermo rating	Risk relative to background risk	Torino rating	Palermo rating	Risk relative to background risk	Torino rating
99942 Apophis	1.10	12.6× greater (1260%)	4	removed from list on 21 February 2021		
(89959) 2002 NT7	0.18	1.51× greater (151%)	1	removed from list on 1 August 2002		
(29075) 1950 DA	0.17	1.48× greater (148%)	-	−0.92	8.32× less (12.0%)	-
background risk	0	equal (100%)	-	0	equal (100%)	-
2024 YR4	−0.18	1.51× less (66.1%)	3	removed from list on 5 March 2026		
(144898) 2004 VD17	−0.25	1.78× less (56.2%)	2	removed from list on 14 February 2008		
(410777) 2009 FD	−0.44	2.75× less (36.3%)	-	removed from list on 19 November 2020		
2022 AE1	−0.66	4.57× less (21.9%)	1	removed from list on 20 January 2022		
2023 GQ2	−0.70	5.01× less (20.0%)	1	removed from list on 1 May 2023		
2013 TV135	−0.73	5.37× less (18.6%)	1	removed from list on 8 November 2013		
(367789) 2011 AG5	−1.00	10× less (10%)	1	removed from list on 21 December 2012		

== List of potential impacts with non-zero peak ratings ==
Below is a comprehensive list of asteroids with potential impacts on Earth over the next 100 years that had been assigned peak cumulative Torino scale ratings above 0 on NASA's Sentry Risk Table.

=== Currently non-zero ===
- none

=== Downgraded to zero ===
This is a partial list of near-Earth asteroids that have been listed with a Torino scale rating of 1+ and been lowered to 0 or been removed from the Sentry Risk Table altogether. Most objects that reach a Torino scale of 1 have a short observation arc of less than 2 weeks and are quickly removed as the observation arc gets longer and more accurate.

- 2025
  - 2025 FA22 (diameter 150 metres (490 ft)) reached level 1 on 25 April 2025, due to a potential impact on September 19, 2089, at 6:43 AM (UTC) with a probability of 0.012%. NASA estimated the kinetic energy of the impact to be equivalent to 140 megatonnes of TNT (586 PJ), which is equivalent to 280% of Tsar Bomba or 70% of the energy released from Krakatoa's eruption. The asteroid passed around 0.004 AU (600 thousand km; 1.6 LD) from the Moon and 0.006 AU (900 thousand km; 2.3 LD) from Earth on September 18, 2025. According to ESA using 1-sigma values, the 2089 approach is on September 23, 2089 03:00 ± 1.5 hours at about 0.04 AU, which is four days after the virtual impactor scenario. On 29 April 2025, the probability of the 2089 impact was 0.009%. On May 1, 2025, the probability of the impact dropped to 1 in 13,000 (0.0075%) and the rating was reduced to 0. On May 17, 2025, it was removed from the risk table. The JPL SBDB using 3-sigma values, shows the close approach to be September 23, 2089 03:00 ± 9 hours at a distance of 0.036 to 0.046 AU.
- 2024
  - 2024 YR4 (diameter 55 metres (180 ft)) reached level 1 on 30 December 2024 and was uprated to level 3 on January 27, 2025, due to a potential impact near December 22, 2032 14:02 (UTC). Using NASA's estimates, the risk peaked at 1 in 32 (3.1%) on February 18, 2025, based on a 55-day observation arc. The high rating triggered the activation of planetary defense policies to use large telescopes not used for general NEO surveys, including the James Webb Space Telescope, to extend the time the object can be tracked as it recedes from Earth. Two days later, after additional observations progressively decreased the uncertainty, the estimated risk dropped to 1 in 370 (0.27%) and the impact hazard was lowered back to level 1. Another three days later, on February 23, 2025, the estimated risk dropped to 1 in 26,000 (0.0039%) and the rating was reduced to 0. By April 2, 2025, all three risk-lists had removed the chances of a 2032 impact. In the April 2025 solution by NASA, the nominal (most probable) distance from Earth on December 22, 2032, is 0.00174 AU (0.68 LD; 260,000 km) with a 3-sigma uncertainty region of about ±0.0006 AU (0.23 LD; 90,000 km) around the nominal closest point; while in ESA's solution, the nominal distance is 0.00179 AU (0.70 LD; 268,000 km) with a 3-sigma uncertainty region of about ±0.00077 AU (0.30 LD; 115,000 km). NASA estimated the kinetic energy of the impact to be equivalent to 7.9 megatonnes of TNT (33.1 PJ). Later on December 22, 2032, the asteroid will have a very close encounter with the Moon, and the probability of a Moon impact is about 4%.
- 2023
  - 2023 TL_{4} (diameter ~300 meters) with an observation arc of 38 days showed a 1 in 29000 chance of impact on October 10, 2119, meriting a Torino scale rating of Level 1. The nominal distance from Earth on October 10, 2119, is 1.4 AU (210 million km) with a 3-sigma uncertainty region of more than a billion km that wraps around the asteroids orbit. The asteroid is not expected to be near Earth on that date. It was removed from the risk table on December 7, 2023.
  - 2023 JE_{5} (diameter ~34 meters) with a 4.7 day observation arc showed a 1 in 480 chance of impact on October 4, 2071, meriting a Torino scale rating of Level 1. The nominal distance from Earth on October 4, 2071, was 0.66 AU (99 million km) with a 3-sigma uncertainty region of about ±90 million km, which placed the impact scenario just outside of the 3-sigma range. With a 6.6-day observation arc the asteroid was dropped to Torino scale 0 with only a 1 in 290,000 chance of impact on October 4, 2071.
  - 2023 GQ2 (diameter ~400 meters) with a 6.7 day observation arc showed a 1 in 24000 chance of impact on November 16, 2028, meriting a Torino scale rating of Level 1. The nominal distance from Earth on 16 November 2028 is now known to be 0.0102 AU (1.53 million km) with a 3-sigma uncertainty region of about ±5 thousand km. It was removed from the risk table on 1 May 2023.
  - 2023 DZ2 (diameter ~56 meters) with a 63-day observation arc showed a 1 in 430 chance of impact on March 27, 2026, meriting a Torino scale rating of Level 1. The nominal distance from Earth on March 27, 2026, is now known to be 0.0303 AU (4.53 million km) with a 3-sigma uncertainty region of about ± 1 million km. On March 21, 2023, with a 66-day observation arc, it was removed from the Sentry Risk Table.
  - 2023 DW (diameter ~48 meters) with a 17.7 day observation arc showed a 1 in 360 chance of impact on February 14, 2046, meriting a Torino scale rating of Level 1. The nominal distance from Earth on February 14, 2046, is now known to be about 0.03 AU (4.5 million km) with a 3-sigma uncertainty region of about ±3 million km. It was lowered to Torino scale 0 on March 16, 2023.
  - 2023 AJ_{1} (diameter ~280 meters) with a 15.2 day observation arc showed a cumulative 1 in 21,000 chance of impact on January 10, 2096, meriting a Torino scale rating of Level 1. The nominal distance from Earth on January 10, 2096, was 1.2 AU (180 million km) with a 3-sigma uncertainty region of about ±230 million km. It was removed from the risk table on February 8, 2023.
- 2022
  - 2022 UE28 (diameter ~170 meters) with a 25-day observation arc showed a 1 in 2,000 chance of impact on April 2, 2064, meriting a Torino scale rating of Level 1. With a 35-day observation arc, the odds were reduced to 1:150,000. The nominal distance from Earth on April 2, 2064, is now known to be 0.06 au (9.0 million km) with a 3-sigma uncertainty region of about ±8 million km.
  - 2022 QX4 (diameter ~40 meters) with a 8-day observation arc showed a 1 in 109 chance of impact on September 4, 2068, meriting a Torino scale rating of Level 1. The nominal distance from Earth on September 4, 2068, is now known to be 0.047 AU (7.0 million km) with an uncertainty region of ±32 thousand km.
  - 2022 BX1 (diameter ~160 meters) with a 22-day observation arc showed a 1 in 7,700 chance of impact on July 11, 2061, meriting a Torino scale rating of Level 1. It was lowered to Torino scale 0 with a 24-day observation arc. The nominal distance from Earth on July 11, 2061, is 0.14 AU (21 million km) with an uncertainty region of ±600 thousand km.
  - 2022 AE1 (diameter ~70 meters) with a 3-8 day observation arc showed about a 1 in 2,000 chance of impact (18 months later) on July 4, 2023, meriting a Torino scale rating of Level 1. The nominal distance from Earth on July 4, 2023, was estimated as small as 0.024 AU (3.6 million km) with an uncertainty region of ±38 million km. It was lowered to Torino scale 0 on January 20, 2022, with a 16-day observation arc and a nominal approach of 7.9 million km.
- 2021
  - 2021 TP21 (diameter ~300 meters) with a 18.9 day observation arc showed a 1 in 56,000 chance of impact on March 27, 2081, meriting a Torino scale rating of Level 1. The nominal distance from Earth on 27 March 2081 was estimated at 1.4 AU (210 million km) with an uncertainty region of ±870 million km. It was removed from the Sentry risk list on November 4, 2021, with a 57-day observation arc and a nominal approach of 2.5 AU with an uncertainty region of ±18 million km.
  - 2021 TA8 (diameter ~200 meters) with a 7.6 day observation arc showed a 1 in 6,700 chance of impact on May 3, 2034, meriting a Torino scale rating of Level 1. With a 7-day arc, the nominal distance from Earth on May 3, 2034, was 0.03 AU (4.5 million km) with an uncertainty region of ±20 million km. It was removed from the ESA and Sentry Risk Table on October 12, 2021, when precovery images from 2010, 2015 and 2018 were located in the DECam and Pan-STARRS archives.
- 2020
  - 2020 XR (diameter ~390 meters) with a 5-day observation arc showed a 1 in 11,000 chance of impact on December 1, 2028, meriting a Torino scale rating of Level 1. The nominal distance from Earth on December 1, 2028, was estimated at 0.16 AU (24 million km; 62 LD) with an uncertainty region of ±304 million km. The 8 day observation arc showed a 1 in 26,000 chance of impact on December 1, 2028, and a nominal distance from Earth on December 1, 2028, of 1 AU (150 million km; 390 LD). On December 13, 2020, precovery observations from 2013, 2016, and mid-2020 extended the observation arc from 8 days to 7.8 years, allowing the asteroid to be removed from the Sentry Risk Table.
  - 2020 NK1 (diameter ~600 meters) initially showed, with a 7.6 day observation arc, a 1 in 83,000 chance of impact on August 3, 2093, meriting a Torino scale rating of Level 1. With a 11.2 day observation arc, the odds decreased to 1 in 7.1 million. However, the odds of an impact on August 4, 2104, increased to 1 in 45,000. With a 13.2 day observation arc, the 2104 impact was ruled out, but an August 4, 2101 impact became more probable, with the odds increasing to 1 in 36,000. The nominal distance from Earth on August 4, 2101, is 0.87 AU (130 million km). It was removed from the sentry risk table entirely on July 31 with a 15.6 day observation arc.
  - 2020 DR2 (diameter ~590 meters) with a 15-day observation showed a 1 in 290,000 chance of impact on September 10, 2074, and showed a 1 in 77,000 chance of impact on September 9, 2081. Cumulatively, this gave the asteroid a 1 in 59,000 chance of impact in the next century. The asteroid was downgraded to 0 after its arc was extended to 16 days with a 1 in 500,000 cumulative chance of impact. It was removed from the sentry risk table entirely on March 11, 2020.
  - 2020 BW14 (diameter ~700 meters) with a 13-day observation arc showed a 1 in 180,000 chance of impact on October 14, 2046. But the nominal solution had the asteroid 0.7 AU (100 million km) from Earth on October 14, 2046. It was removed from the Sentry monitoring list on February 10, 2020, with 19 precovery images from January to April 2016.
- 2019
  - No asteroids reached Torino scale 1 in 2019.
- 2018
  - 2018 LB1 was removed from the Sentry monitoring list on June 14, 2018 after having been on the Risk List with a Torino scale of Level 1.
  - 2018 GG2 (diameter ~480 meters) with a 7-day observation arc showed a 1 in 270,000 chance of impact on April 5, 2111, using the April 17, 2018 orbit solution. Later on the same day it was removed from the Sentry Risk Table as a result of precovery images dating back to September 24, 2017, extending the observation arc to 205 days.
  - 2017 XO2 was listed on the JPL Near Earth Object Risk List with a Torino scale of Level 1 as of January 20, 2018. With a 40-day observation arc, it had an estimated 1 in 3000 chance of impacting Earth on April 28, 2057. The asteroid is estimated to have a diameter of about 110 meters (360 ft). The nominal 2057 Earth approach distance was estimated at 0.001 au (100,000 km; 90,000 mi) with a 3-sigma uncertainty of ±52 million km. On January 27, 2018, Pan-STARRS precovery images from November and December 2011 were announced, and 2017 XO_{2} was removed from the Sentry Risk Table.
  - 2017 YZ1 was listed on the JPL Near Earth Object Risk List and NEODyS Risk List with a Torino scale of Level 1 on January 5, 2018. With a 15-day observation arc, it had an estimated 1 in 21000 chance of impacting Earth on June 30, 2047. The asteroid is estimated to have a diameter of 260 meters (850 ft), and would impact Earth at a relative speed of 18 km/s (40,000 mph). By January 9, 2018, the geocentric June 30, 2047 uncertainty region had shrunk to ±50 million km. After calculations based on a 20-day observation arc were made, chances of impact on June 30, 2047, dropped to 1 in 670,000, and 2017 YZ_{1} was downgraded to Level 0.
- 2017
  - 2017 CH1 was listed on the NEODyS Risk List with a Torino scale of Level 1 on February 8, 2017. It was estimated to be 900 meters in diameter, with a 1 in 500,000 chance of impact on June 4, 2095. Such an impact could create a crater 10 km in diameter. Follow-up observations on February 10 eliminated the chances of impact on every date except for June 4, 2044, with a 4.59×10^{−10} chance of impact on that date, or less than a 1 in 2 billion chance of impact. It was removed from the Sentry Risk Table on February 15, 2017.
  - 2017 BL30 was listed on the JPL Near Earth Object Risk List and NEODyS Risk List with a Torino scale of Level 1 on February 3, 2017. With a 5-day observation arc, it had an estimated 1 in 1610 chance of impacting Earth on August 3, 2029. With a 6-day observation arc, the odds were 1 in 1270. With a 7-day observation arc, the odds were 1 in 909. With a 10-day observation arc, the odds were 1 in 826. The asteroid is estimated to have a diameter of 70 meters (230 ft), and would impact Earth at a relative speed of 13 km/s (29,000 mph). The value decreased to 0 with further observations on February 11, with a cumulative impact chance of 1 in 4258.
  - 2017 AM4 was listed on the JPL Near Earth Object Risk List and NEODyS Risk List with a Torino scale of Level 1 on January 19, 2017. With a 14-day observation arc, it had an estimated 1 in 59,000 chance of impacting Earth on August 1, 2024. The asteroid is estimated to have a diameter of 500 meters (1,600 ft), and would impact Earth at a relative speed of 33 km/s (74,000 mph). With a 16-day observation arc, the odds of impact were reduced to 1 in a million. It was removed from the Sentry Risk Table on January 23, 2017, with a 19-day observation arc.
- 2016
  - 2016 XP23 was listed on the JPL Near Earth Object Risk List with a Torino scale of Level 1 on December 25, 2016, while the NEODyS Risk List has it at a lower impact probability, sufficient to classify it as Torino scale Level 0. With a 15-day observation arc, it was listed with an estimated 1 in 105,000 chance of impacting Earth on November 1, 2110. The asteroid is estimated to have a diameter of 360 meters (1,180 ft), and would have impacted Earth at a relative speed of 27 km/s (60,000 mph). It was removed from the Sentry Risk Table on January 7, 2017, with a 29-day observation arc.
  - 2016 WJ1 was listed on the JPL Near Earth Object Risk List with a Torino scale of Level 1 on November 25, 2016, while the NEODyS Risk List has it at a lower impact probability, sufficient to classify it as Torino scale Level 0. With a 10-day observation arc, it had an estimated 1 in 8000 chance of impacting Earth on June 12, 2065. It was discovered on November 19, 2016, by Mt. Lemmon Survey. The asteroid is estimated to have a diameter of 180 meters (590 ft), and would have impacted Earth at a relative speed of 18.61 km/s (42,000 mph). It was removed from the Sentry Risk Table on December 2, 2016, when prediscovery images by Pan-STARRS from October 2016 and precovery images taken from Mauna Kea in July 2003 where located and included in the impact calculations.
  - (893194) 2016 EU85 was rated at level 1 by NEODyS on March 25, 2016, but subsequently lowered to zero thanks to prediscovery observations by the Pan-STARRS survey. The asteroid is estimated to have a diameter of about 440 meters (1,440 ft).
  - 2016 BE was rated at level 1 for a day on January 25, 2016, by the NEODyS system, and downgraded to level 0 the following day. On the Sentry system it never crossed the threshold between the two levels, due to a lower computed impact probability.
- 2015
  - 2015 PU228 was listed on NEODyS with a Torino scale of Level 1 on August 23, 2015. Sentry also listed it with a Torino scale of Level 1 on August 24, 2015. With a 10-day observation arc, it had an estimated 1 in 84,000 chance of impacting Earth on January 15, 2081. It was downgraded to level 0 on September 8, 2015. It was discovered on August 13, 2015, by the Space Surveillance Telescope. The asteroid is estimated to have a diameter of 340 meters (1,120 ft).
  - 2015 NK13 was listed on the JPL Near Earth Object Risk List with a Torino scale of Level 1 on July 2, 2015, and again on August 11, 2015, while the NEODyS Risk List had it at a slightly lower impact probability, sufficient to classify it as Torino scale Level 0. In July and August it was downgraded to Level 0 the following day. With a 13-day observation arc, it had an estimated 1 in 36,000 chance of impacting Earth on 5 October 2096. It was discovered on July 12, 2015, by Pan-STARRS. The asteroid is estimated to have a diameter of 310 meters (1,020 ft), and would impact Earth at a relative speed of 14.35 km/s (32,000 mph).
- 2014
  - 2007 VK184 was listed on the Near Earth Object Risk List with a Torino scale of Level 1 from after its discovery in November 2007 until recovered in March 2014. With an observation arc of 60 days, it had about a 1 in 1800 chance of impacting Earth on June 3, 2048; the probability went to effectively zero when the 2014 recovery observations were taken into account. The asteroid is estimated to have a diameter of 130 meters (430 ft), and travels through space with a speed of 15.6 km/s relative to Earth.
  - 2014 DA with an estimated diameter of 100 meters was rated level 1 on February 23, 2014, with an observation arc of 5 days. It was estimated to have a 1 in 5,560 chance of impact on February 2, 2027. It was lowered to Torino scale 0 on the next day (February 24, 2014).
- 2013
  - 2013 TV135 (a near-Earth asteroid with a 450 m diameter) was rated level 1 on October 16, 2013 (with an observation arc of 7.3 days). It was downgraded to 0 on November 3, 2013. It was removed from the Sentry Risk Table on 8 November 2013 using JPL solution 32 with an observation arc of 27 days.
- 2012
  - (367789) 2011 AG5 was rated at Torino scale 1 from February 2011 to December 2012, for an impact on February 5, 2040. It was downgraded thanks to observations collected in October 2012 with telescopes on Mauna Kea, Hawaii.
  - 2012 MU2 was rated at Torino scale 1 on 23 June 2012 with an observation arc of 4 days. With an observation arc of only 6 days it showed a 1 in 7140 chance of impact on June 1, 2015. It was removed from the Sentry Risk Table on June 25.
  - 2012 CA21 was rated level 1 on February 21, 2012 (with an observation arc of 8.9 days). It was removed from the risk table on March 3, 2012.
- 2011
  - (436724) 2011 UW158 was rated level 1 on November 4, 2011, with an observation arc of 9 days. There was a 1 in 56,000 chance of impact on 8 July 2079. It was removed from the risk table November 17, 2011.
  - (415029) 2011 UL21 is an asteroid with a diameter of 2.6 km, which was rated level 1 on October 27, 2011 (with an observation arc of 9.6 days). It was downgraded to 0 a few days later.
  - 2011 SM68 was rated level 1 on September 28, 2011, with an observation arc of 2.6 days and listed virtual impactors in 2016 and 2019. But it was quickly downgraded to 0 a few days later and was removed from the risk table on October 7, 2011.
  - 2011 BM45 was rated level 1 on February 13, 2011, with an observation arc of 13.8 days. There was a 1 in 24,000 chance of impact on January 18, 2086. It was removed from the risk table on 10 March 2011.
- 2010
  - 2010 XC25 was rated level 1 in December 2010, and downgraded to 0 on January 2, 2011.
  - (494999) 2010 JU39 was rated level 1 on May 18, 2010, with an observation arc of 7 days. There was roughly an estimated 1 in 77,000 chance of impact on June 26, 2058. It was removed from the risk table on May 23, 2010.
  - (308635) 2005 YU55 was rated level 1 in February 2010, and downgraded to 0 on April 9, 2010. The chance of an actual collision with an asteroid like 2005 YU55 (~400 meters in diameter) is about 1 percent in the next thousand years.
- 2009
  - (359369) 2009 YG was rated level 1 on December 28, 2009 (with an observation arc of 10 days). It was downgraded to 0 by the end of December.
  - 2009 WM1 was rated level 1 after its discovery on November 17, 2009, and downgraded by the end of November. It was removed from the risk table on June 26, 2013.
  - 2009 KK was rated level 1 after its discovery in May 2009 (with a 15-day observation arc), and downgraded to 0 by June 11, 2009. It was removed from the risk table June 17, 2009.
- 2008
  - (332446) 2008 AF4 was rated level 1 until February 14, 2008. It was removed from the risk table on 19 December 2009.
- 2007
  - (435159) 2007 LQ19 was rated level 1 on July 3, 2007, with an observation arc of 19 days. The asteroid was estimated to be 930 meters (3,050 ft) in diameter and there was a 1 in 556,000 chance of impact on July 11, 2082. It was removed from the risk table on July 15, 2007.
  - (481482) 2007 CA19 was rated level 1 for one week ending February 19, 2007. The asteroid was estimated to be roughly 970 meters (3,180 ft) in diameter and had a virtual impactor listing a 1 in 625,000 chance of impact on March 14, 2012. It was removed from the risk table on February 22.
- 2006
  - (417634) 2006 XG1 was rated level 1 on December 22, 2006, when it had an observation arc of 25 days, but was removed from the Sentry Risk Table on February 7, 2007.
  - (292220) 2006 SU49 (with an observation arc of 7 days) showed a 1 in 42000 chance of impacting Earth on January 22, 2029. It was removed from the Sentry Risk Table on November 23, 2006.
  - (433953) 1997 XR2 was a lost asteroid from December 1997 that had an observation arc of 27 days. From early 2002 until February 24, 2006, it was estimated to have a 1 in 10,000 chance of impacting Earth on June 1, 2101. It was removed from the risk table on February 24, 2006, when it was serendipitously rediscovered.
  - (144898) 2004 VD17 (using an observation arc of 475 days) was upgraded to level 2 in February 2006 for a possible 2102 encounter, making it the second asteroid rated above level 1. It was downgraded to 0 after further observations. It was removed from the Sentry Risk Table on February 14, 2008.
- 2005
  - No asteroids reached Torino scale 1 in 2005.
- 2004
  - (99942) Apophis (a near-Earth asteroid 370 meters in diameter) became the first object rated level 2 on December 23, 2004, and was subsequently uprated to level 4—the record for highest Torino rating as of February 2025. It is now known Apophis will pass 38000 km from Earth on April 13, 2029. It retained a rating of level 1 for a 2036 approach due to the prior orbital uncertainties introduced by the close approach of 2029. In August 2006 Apophis was downrated to 0. In 2021 Apophis was removed from the risk table.
  - (497117) 2004 FU4 was rated level 1 on March 27, 2004, with an observation arc of 6.9 days. It was lowered to 0 on 2 April 2004. It was removed from the risk table on April 13, 2004.
  - (144332) 2004 DV24 was rated level 1 on March 1, 2004, with an observation arc of 7.8 days. It was removed from the risk table on March 5, 2004.
- 2003
  - (164121) 2003 YT1 was rated level 1 on December 27, 2003, with an observation arc of 8.7 days. It was removed from the risk table on December 29, 2003.
  - (143651) 2003 QO104 was rated level 1 in early October 2003, and removed from the risk table on October 13, 2003.
  - (143649) 2003 QQ47 was rated level 1 on August 30, 2003 and removed from the Sentry Risk Table on September 14, 2003.
  - (387746) 2003 MH4 was rated level 1 on July 7, 2003, with an observation arc of 10 days. There was roughly an estimated 1 in 19,000 chance of impact on June 9, 2077. It was removed from the risk table on July 29, 2003.
  - (177049) 2003 EE16 was rated level 1 on April 2, 2003, and removed from the risk table on May 28, 2003.
- 2002
  - (89959) 2002 NT7 was rated level 1 on July 24, 2002, and was removed from the risk table on August 1, 2002.
  - (163132) 2002 CU11 was rated level 1 on March 20, 2002, and removed from the Sentry Risk Table on 26 April 2002.
