= (433953) 1997 XR2 =

Near-Earth asteroid

(433953) 1997 XR_{2}
Discovery
- Discovered by: LINEAR
- Discovery site: Lincoln Lab's ETS
- Discovery date: 4 December 1997

Designations
- Minor planet category: Apollo · NEO · PHA

Orbital characteristics
- Epoch 4 September 2017 (JD 2458000.5)
- Uncertainty parameter 0
- Observation arc: 19.20 yr (7,014 days)
- Aphelion: 1.2924 AU
- Perihelion: 0.8601 AU
- Semi-major axis: 1.0762 AU
- Eccentricity: 0.2008
- Orbital period (sidereal): 1.12 yr (408 days)
- Mean anomaly: 316.19°
- Mean motion: 0° 52^{m} 58.08^{s} / day
- Inclination: 7.1919°
- Longitude of ascending node: 250.69°
- Argument of perihelion: 84.604°
- Earth MOID: 0.000135 AU · 0.05 LD

Physical characteristics
- Mean diameter: 0.2 km (generic); 0.23 km
- Mass: 1.7×10^{10} kg
- Absolute magnitude (H): 20.8

(433953) 1997 XR_{2} is a sub-kilometer sized asteroid, classified as a near-Earth object and potentially hazardous asteroid of the Apollo group. It was discovered on 4 December 1997, by the Lincoln Near-Earth Asteroid Research (LINEAR) program at Lincoln Laboratory's Experimental Test Site near Socorro, New Mexico, in the United States.

== Orbit and classification ==
The asteroid orbits the Sun at a distance of 0.9–1.3 AU once every 13 months (408 days). Its orbit has an eccentricity of 0.20 and an inclination of 7° with respect to the ecliptic.

It has an Earth minimum orbital intersection distance of 0.000135 AU, which corresponds to 0.05 lunar distances. The body's observation arc begins with its official discovery observation, as no precoveries were taken, and no prior identifications were made.

== Impact risk ==
Between 2002 and 2006, 1997 XR_{2} was considered to have about a 1 in 10,000 chance of colliding with Earth on 1 June 2101, based on a 27-day observation arc following its discovery. With an estimated mass of 1.7×10^{10} kilograms, it was ranked at level 1 on the Torino scale (0–10) of impact risk, and was the only near-Earth object to be ranked higher than zero until it was joined by 2004 VD17 at level 1 in November 2004, and then when 99942 Apophis – then known only by its provisional designation 2004 MN_{4} – was temporarily assessed at level four in December 2004. Both 2004 VD17 and 99942 Apophis are now rated at level zero.

=== Recovery ===
On 24 February 2006, 1997 XR_{2} was observed by the Mount Lemmon Survey after being lost for more than 8 years. The refinement of its orbit eliminated the possibility of impact in 2101. It is now known that on 20 November 2101, the asteroid will be 0.0392 AU (5,860,000 km) from Earth.

== Physical characteristics ==
According to a generic conversion of absolute magnitude to diameter, 1997 XR_{2} measures 200 to 230 meters.

== Naming ==
As of 2017, this minor planet remains unnamed.
