= (410777) 2009 FD =

Asteroid

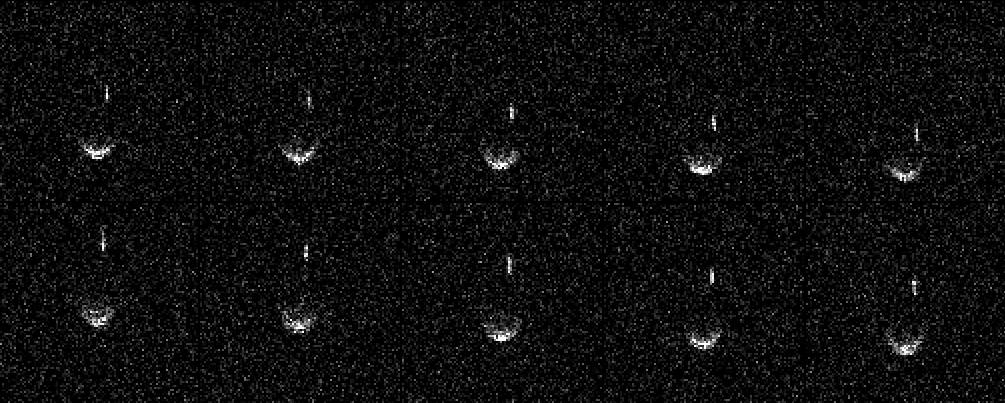
- Arecibo Observatory radar images of 2009 FD

Discovery
- Discovered by: Spacewatch
- Discovery site: Kitt Peak National Obs.
- Discovery date: 24 February 2009

Designations
- Minor planet category: Apollo; NEO; PHA

Orbital characteristics
- Epoch 3 July 2013 (JD 2456476.5)
- Uncertainty parameter 0
- Observation arc: 6.77 yr (2,471 days)
- Aphelion: 1.7361 AU
- Perihelion: 0.5896 AU
- Semi-major axis: 1.1629 AU
- Eccentricity: 0.4929
- Orbital period (sidereal): 1.25 yr (458 days)
- Mean anomaly: 98.579°
- Mean motion: 0° 47^{m} 9.6^{s} / day
- Inclination: 3.1366°
- Longitude of ascending node: 9.5523°
- Argument of perihelion: 281.24°
- Known satellites: 1
- Earth MOID: 0.0025 AU (1 LD)

Physical characteristics
- Mean diameter: 0.113 km (calculated); 0.150 km (Note: Naidu, S. (2015) from observations taken in November 2015: Per private communication with the LCDB. Rotation period of at least 2.5 hours. Diameter estimate of 0.150 kilometers. Summary figures for (410777) at the LCDB); 0.472 km; Primary: 120–180 m; Secondary: 60–120 m
- Mass: 8.3×10^{10} kg (assumed)
- Synodic rotation period: 2.5 h (at least); 4.0 h; 5.87±0.02 h; 6.22±0.41 h
- Geometric albedo: 0.01; 0.20 (assumed)
- Spectral type: C; S (assumed)
- Absolute magnitude (H): 22.1

(410777) 2009 FD is a carbonaceous sub-kilometer asteroid and binary system, classified as a near-Earth object and potentially hazardous asteroid of the Apollo group, discovered on 24 February 2009 by astronomers of the Spacewatch program at Kitt Peak National Observatory near Tucson, Arizona, in the United States.

Until 2019, the asteroid's modelled orbit placed it at risk of a possible future collision with Earth in 2185. With a Palermo scale rating of -0.44, it had the fifth highest impact threat (Note: Behind: 99942 Apophis @ 1.10, (89959) 2002 NT7 @ 0.18, (29075) 1950 DA @ 0.17, (144898) 2004 VD17 @ -0.25) of all known asteroids based on its estimated diameter, kinetic yield, impact probability, and time interval. Observations in 2019 extended the observation arc by four years and detected a favourable Yarkovsky effect, which ruled out impact in 2185. Using observations from 16 November 2020, the asteroid was removed from the Sentry risk table on 19 November 2020.

== Discovery ==
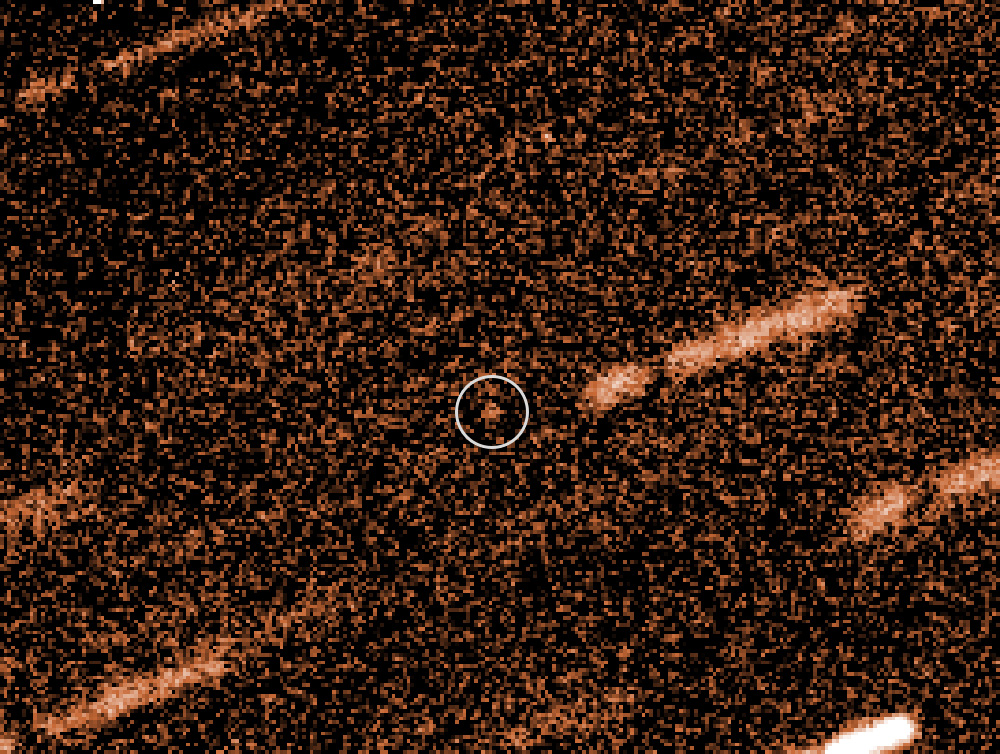
2009 FD imaged by the Very Large Telescope in November 2013

2009 FD was initially announced as discovered on 16 March 2009 by La Sagra Sky Survey. Because there were previous observations found in images taken by the Spacewatch survey some 3 weeks prior, on 24 February 2009, the Minor Planet Center assigned the discovery credit to Spacewatch under the discovery assignment rules. 2009 FD made a close pass to Earth on 27 March 2009 at a distance of 0.004172 AU (624,100 km; 387,800 mi) and another on 24 October 2010 at 0.0702 AU. 2009 FD was recovered at apparent magnitude 23 (Note: At an apparent magnitude of 23, 2009 FD was roughly 4 million times fainter than can be seen with the naked eye. Math: $(\sqrt[5]{100})^{23-6.5}\approx 3981071$) on 30 November 2013 by Cerro Paranal Observatory, several months before the close approach of April 2014 when it passed 0.1 AU from Earth. It brightened to roughly apparent magnitude 19.3 around mid-March 2014. One radar Doppler observation of 2009 FD was made in 2014. The October–November 2015 Earth approach was studied by the Goldstone Deep Space Network.

== Binary ==
NASA's Near Earth Program originally estimated its size to be 130 metres in diameter based on an assumed albedo of 0.15. This gave it an estimated mass of around 2,800,000 tonnes. But work by Amy Mainzer using NEOWISE data in 2014 showed that it could be as large as 472 metres with an albedo as low as 0.01. Because 2009 FD (K09F00D) was only detected in two (W1+W2) of the four wavelengths the suspected NEOWISE diameter is more of an upper limit. Radar observations in 2015 showed it to be a binary asteroid. The primary is 120–180 meters in diameter and the secondary is 60–120 meters in diameter.

== Future approaches ==
The JPL Small-Body Database shows that 2009 FD will make two very close approaches in the late 22nd century, in 2185 and 2190. As of 2016, the approach of 29 March 2185 had a 1 in 710 chance of impacting Earth. The nominal 2185 Earth approach distance was 0.009 AU (1,300,000 km; 840,000 mi). Orbit determination for 2190 is complicated by the 2185 close approach. The precise distance that it will pass from Earth and the Moon on 29 March 2185 will determine the 30 March 2190 distance. 2009 FD should pass closer to the Moon than Earth on 29 March 2185. An impact by 2009 FD would cause severe devastation to a large region or tsunamis of significant size.

=== Past Earth-impact estimates ===
In January 2011, near-Earth asteroid 2009 FD (with observations through 7 December 2010) was listed on the JPL Sentry Risk Table with a 1 in 435 chance of impacting Earth on 29 March 2185. In 2014 (with observations through 5 February 2014, creating an observation arc of 1807 days) the potential 2185 impact was ruled out. Using the 2014 observations, the Yarkovsky effect has become more significant than the position uncertainties. The Yarkovsky effect has resulted in the 2185 virtual impactor returning. While 2009 FD was estimated to be 470 meters in diameter, it was rated −0.40 on the Palermo scale, placing it higher on the Sentry Risk Table than any other known object at the time.

On 14 June 2019, Alessio Del Vigna and colleagues published a new analysis, which incorporates astrometry taken in 2019. Using both JPL's Sentry as well as NEODyS's CLOMON-2 system, the new data allowed a 4-sigma detection of the Yarkovsky effect at (+3.6±0.9)×10^{−3} AU/Myr. The 2019 observations extended the observation arc from six years to ten years. This ruled out the 2185 impact possibility, leaving the potential impact in 2190 as the only theoretically possible impact until 2250, at a very low probability of 1 in 100 million. On 19 November 2020, the asteroid was finally completely removed from the sentry risk table as all possible impacts, including 2190 and 2250, were ruled out.

== See also ==
- List of asteroid close approaches to Earth, for other close approaches
