= (417634) 2006 XG1 =

Near-Earth asteroid

(417634) 2006 XG_{1}
Discovery
- Discovered by: CSS
- Discovery site: Mount Lemmon Obs.
- Discovery date: 11 December 2006

Designations
- Minor planet category: Apollo; NEO; PHA

Orbital characteristics
- Epoch 4 September 2017 (JD 2458000.5)
- Uncertainty parameter 0
- Observation arc: 8.09 yr (2,956 days)
- Aphelion: 3.9218 AU
- Perihelion: 0.9943 AU
- Semi-major axis: 2.4580 AU
- Eccentricity: 0.5955
- Orbital period (sidereal): 3.85 yr (1,408 days)
- Mean anomaly: 287.03°
- Mean motion: 0° 15^{m} 20.88^{s} / day
- Inclination: 20.493°
- Longitude of ascending node: 38.478°
- Argument of perihelion: 344.11°
- Earth MOID: 0.0157 AU (6.1 LD)

Physical characteristics
- Mean diameter: 0.418±0.081 km
- Mass: 4.2×10^{11} kg (estimate)
- Geometric albedo: 0.154±0.061
- Absolute magnitude (H): 18.5

(417634) 2006 XG_{1} provisional designation 2006 XG_{1}, is a sub-kilometer asteroid, classified as near-Earth object and potentially hazardous asteroid of the Apollo group, that had a low but non-zero probability of impacting Earth on 31 October 2041. The asteroid was discovered on 20 September 2006, by astronomers of the Catalina Sky Survey, using a dedicated 0.68-meter telescope at Mount Lemmon Observatory in Arizona, United States.

== Description ==
Originally listed with a Torino Scale hazard rating of 0, this was raised to a rating of 1 on 22 December 2006 as a result of additional observations and refinement of the orbital calculations. However, on 9 January 2007 it was returned to a rating of 0. It was removed from the Sentry Risk Table on 7 February 2007.

It is now known that the asteroid will not make a close approach to the Earth in 2041. On 31 October 2041, the asteroid will be 1.69 AU (253,000,000 km; 157,000,000 mi) from the Earth. 2006 XG_{1} passed 0.0298 AU (4,460,000 km; 2,770,000 mi) from asteroid 87 Sylvia on 20 June 1969. It is also a Mars-crosser asteroid.

=== Physical characteristics ===
According to the survey carried out by the NEOWISE mission of NASA's Wide-field Infrared Survey Explorer, 2006 XG_{1} measures 418 meters in diameter and its surface has an albedo of 0.154. Previously, JPL's Sentry System estimated a diameter of 670 meters with a mass of 4.2×10^{11} kg.
