= (523662) 2012 MU2 =

Sub-kilometer asteroid on an eccentric orbit

(523662) 2012 MU_{2}
Discovery
- Discovered by: Catalina Sky Srvy.
- Discovery site: Catalina Stn.
- Discovery date: 18 June 2012

Designations
- Minor planet category: Apollo · NEO · PHA

Orbital characteristics
- Epoch 27 April 2019 (JD 2458600.5)
- Uncertainty parameter 0
- Observation arc: 6.23 yr (2,277 d)
- Aphelion: 3.1119 AU
- Perihelion: 0.9987 AU
- Semi-major axis: 2.0553 AU
- Eccentricity: 0.5141
- Orbital period (sidereal): 2.95 yr (1,076 d)
- Mean anomaly: 114.89°
- Mean motion: 0° 20^{m} 4.2^{s} / day
- Inclination: 11.222°
- Longitude of ascending node: 250.33°
- Argument of perihelion: 16.587°
- Earth MOID: 0.0011 AU (0.43 LD)

Physical characteristics
- Mean diameter: 240 m (est.)
- Absolute magnitude (H): 20.8

(523662) 2012 MU_{2} is a sub-kilometer asteroid on an eccentric orbit, classified as a near-Earth object and potentially hazardous asteroid of the Apollo group. It was discovered on 18 June 2012 by astronomers of the Catalina Sky Survey at an apparent magnitude of 19.9 using a 0.68-meter (27 in) Schmidt–Cassegrain telescope. It has an estimated diameter of 240 meters (790 ft). The asteroid was listed on Sentry Risk Table with a Torino Scale rating of 1 on 23 June 2012.

== Orbit and classification ==
2012 MU_{2} is a member of the Apollo asteroids, a group of near-Earth objects with an Earth-crossing orbit. It orbits the Sun at a distance of 1.0–3.1 AU once every 2 years and 11 months (1,076 days; semi-major axis of 2.06 AU). Its orbit has an eccentricity of 0.51 and an inclination of 11° with respect to the ecliptic.

On 24 June 2012 with an observation arc of 6 days, 2012 MU_{2} showed a 1 in 7,140 chance of impacting Earth on 1 June 2015. It was removed from the Sentry Risk Table on the next day (25 June).

With an observation arc of 113 days, the JPL Small-Body Database (solution JPL 42 dated 2013-Aug-05) shows that 2012 MU_{2} may make a very close approach to asteroid 29 Amphitrite on 8 April 2179. The minimum approach distance is about 0.000032 AU (4,800 km; 3,000 mi), but the maximum distance is 0.14 AU (21,000,000 km; 13,000,000 mi). The nominal approach is 0.047 AU (7,000,000 km; 4,400,000 mi).

The Earth approach in 2015 occurred on 15 May 2015 at a distance of 0.11485 AU (17,181,000 km; 10,676,000 mi).

== Numbering and naming ==
This minor planet was numbered by the Minor Planet Center on 25 September 2018 (M.P.C. 111778). As of 2018, it has not been named.
