= 2024 YR4 =

Risk-listed near-Earth asteroid

2024 YR_{4}
- 2024 YR_{4} (centered) tracked by the Very Large Telescope in January 2025

Discovery
- Discovered by: ATLAS–CHL (W68)
- Discovery site: Río Hurtado, Chile
- Discovery date: 27 December 2024

Designations
- Minor planet category: NEO; Apollo; risk-listed

Orbital characteristics (JPL #79)
- Epoch 21 Nov 2025 (JD 2461000.5)
- Uncertainty parameter 1
- Observation arc: 428 days
- Earliest precovery date: 25 December 2024
- Aphelion: 4.180 AU (Note: Between 2025–2032, the farthest the asteroid will get from Earth will be on 7 November 2030 when the asteroid will be near aphelion on the opposite side of the Sun placing it 5.17 AU from Earth.)
- Perihelion: 0.8517 AU; 0.8532 AU (2028); 0.8692 AU (2032)
- Semi-major axis: 2.5158 AU
- Eccentricity: 0.6615
- Orbital period (sidereal): 3.991 yr (1457.57 days)
- Mean anomaly: 89.8°
- Mean motion: 0.2470° per day
- Inclination: 3.4082°
- Longitude of ascending node: 271.364°
- Time of perihelion: 22 November 2024; 19 November 2028; 21 November 2032; September 2036?
- Argument of perihelion: 134.366°
- Earth MOID: 0.002803 AU (419,300 km; 1.091 LD)
- Jupiter MOID: 1.2711 AU

Physical characteristics
- Mean diameter: 60.8+1.8 −3.6 m
- Synodic rotation period: 19.4633 ± 0.0001 min (0.3243883 ± 1.7×10^{−6} h)
- Pole ecliptic longitude: ~ 42°
- Pole ecliptic latitude: ~ −25°
- Geometric albedo: 0.11+0.05 −0.03
- Spectral type: R-type or Sa-type; S-type (most likely); L-type; K-type
- Apparent magnitude: 24 (13 February); 25 (26 February); 26 (14 March); 28.7 (11 May); 29.4 (2026 opposition)
- Absolute magnitude (H): 24.05±0.15 (phase corrected); 23.96±0.28 (JPL)

2024 YR_{4} is an asteroid with an estimated diameter of 53 to 67 metres (174 to 220 ft) that is classified as an Apollo-type (Earth-crossing) near-Earth object. From 27 January to 20 February 2025, it had an impact rating of 3 on the Torino scale, reflecting its size and an estimated probability greater than 1% that it would impact Earth on 22 December 2032. The estimated impact probability peaked at 3.1% on 18 February 2025. By 23 February, additional observations effectively ruled out 2024 YR_{4} impacting Earth in 2032 and lowered its Torino rating to 0. As of 11 May 2025, there was about a 4% chance of a Moon impact on 22 December 2032 around 15:19 UTC, but two additional observations by the James Webb Space Telescope in February 2026 reduced that chance to 0%. 2024 YR_{4} will safely pass 21200±2300 km from the surface of the Moon. (Note: For comparison, 99942 Apophis will pass 31600 km from the surface of Earth on 13 April 2029.) Pending precovery images from 2016 also support the close approach distance.

The asteroid was discovered by the Chilean station of the Asteroid Terrestrial-impact Last Alert System (ATLAS) at Río Hurtado on 27 December 2024. When additional observations increased its impact probability to greater than 1%, the first step in planetary defense responses was triggered, prompting additional data gathering using several major telescopes and leading space agencies to begin planning asteroid threat mitigation.

The asteroid made a close approach to Earth at a distance of 828,800 kilometres (515,000 miles; 2.156 lunar distances) on 25 December 2024, two days before its discovery, and it will be moving away from the Sun until November 2026. Its next close approach will take place on 17 December 2028. Analysis of spectral and photometric time series suggests that 2024 YR_{4} is a stony S-type (most likely), L-type or K-type asteroid, with a rotation period of approximately 19.5 minutes. A number of known asteroids, including other virtual impactors, (Note: A virtual impactor is a known risk-listed asteroid with at least a 1-in-10-billion chance of impacting the Earth over the next 100 years.) follow orbits somewhat consistent with that of 2024 YR_{4}.

== Provisional designation ==
The asteroid's provisional designation as a minor planet, "2024 YR_{4}", was assigned by the Minor Planet Center when its discovery was announced on 27 December 2024. "Y", the first letter after the discovery year, indicates that the asteroid was discovered in the second half-month of December (16 to 31 December), and "R_{4}" indicates that it was the 117th provisional designation to be assigned in that half-month.

== Physical characteristics ==
=== Size and mass ===
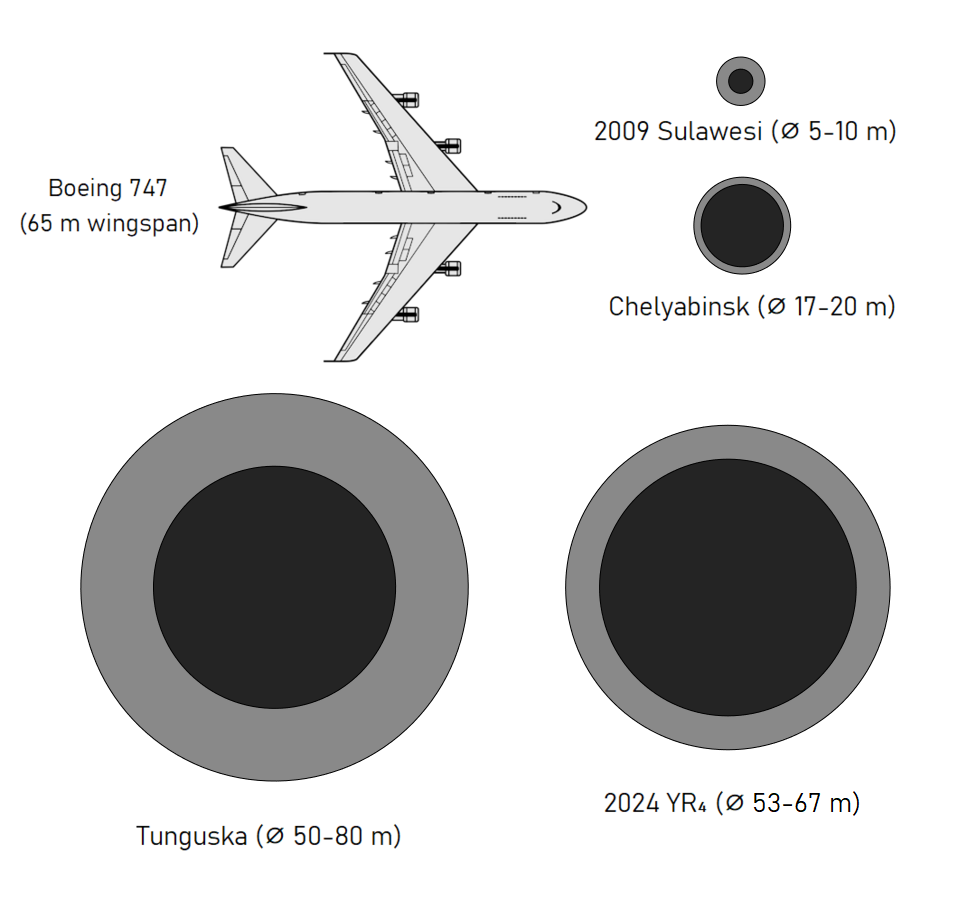
Comparison of the estimated diameters of 2024 YR_{4} and other notable meteoroids (the 2009 Sulawesi superbolide, the 2013 Chelyabinsk meteor, and the 1908 Tunguska impactor), with a Boeing 747 shown for scale

Measurements of 2024 YR_{4}'s mid-infrared thermal emission by the James Webb Space Telescope (JWST) on 26 March 2025 indicate that it has a diameter of 60 m (200 ft), with an uncertainty of 7 m (23 ft). This makes 2024 YR_{4} around the same size as the asteroid that caused the 1908 Tunguska event or the iron–nickel asteroid that created the Meteor Crater in Arizona 50,000 years ago. 2024 YR_{4} is significantly smaller than Dimorphos, the impact target of NASA's Double Asteroid Redirection Test (DART) in 2022. The possible size range implies a geometric albedo between 0.08 and 0.18, relatively low for a stony asteroid.

Prior to the JWST measurement, more uncertain estimates for 2024 YR_{4}'s diameter were based on its brightness (absolute magnitude) and using a range of plausible values for its surface reflectivity (geometric albedo). If 2024 YR_{4} reflects between 5% and 25% of visible light, as do the vast majority of asteroids with a measured albedo, then its diameter had to be between 40 and 90 m (130 and 300 ft). An estimate by NASA for instance placed its diameter at 55 m (180 ft) by assuming a geometric albedo of 0.154.

The mass and density of 2024 YR_{4} have not been measured, but the mass can be loosely estimated with an assumed density and the estimated diameter. Assuming a density of 2.6 g/cm^{3} (1.5 oz/cu in), which is within the density range for stony asteroids such as 243 Ida, and the then nominal diameter of 55 m (180 ft), the Sentry risk table estimated a mass of 2.2×10^{8} kg (4.9×10^{8} lb). Rescaling the diameter to the now better measured value of 60 m (200 ft) increases the estimated mass to 2.8×10^{8} kg (6.2×10^{8} lb). Both the assumed density and the inferred diameter contribute large uncertainties to the mass estimated.

=== Composition, rotation, and shape ===
Preliminary spectroscopic analysis from the Gran Telescopio Canarias and Lowell Discovery Telescope suggests that 2024 YR_{4} is either an S-type asteroid (17% of the asteroid population), an L-type asteroid, or a K-type asteroid, all of which point to a stony composition. (Note: C-type asteroids are about 75% of the asteroid population, S-type asteroids are about 17%, and M-type asteroids (iron–nickel) are about 5%.) Spectro-photometry by the Gemini South telescope in February 2025 suggest either an R or Sa spectral type for 2024 YR_{4}. JWST measurements of 2024 YR_{4}'s thermal emission suggest "a rockier surface than commonly inferred."

Photometric observations by the Very Large Telescope (VLT) and the La Silla Observatory's 1.54-metre (5.1 ft) telescope indicate 2024 YR_{4} has a rotation period near 19.5 minutes. Observations by the Gemini South telescope from February 2025 found similar results for 2024 YR_{4}'s rotation period. This is a relatively fast rotation period for an asteroid, although it is not fast enough to rule out a rubble pile structure for 2024 YR_{4}. The VLT has also observed 2024 YR_{4} at multiple phase angles from 5° to 35°, which would allow for the construction of a phase curve which can constrain the asteroid's surface properties.

The brightness of 2024 YR_{4} varies by 0.42 magnitudes as it rotates, indicating it has an elongated shape with its longest equatorial length being at least 1.4 times that of its shortest equatorial length. Gemini South telescope measurements of 2024 YR_{4}'s rotational light curve at various phase angles show that the asteroid has a retrograde rotation and a highly flattened shape with an equatorial diameter roughly 3 times as long as its polar diameter.

== Orbit ==
As an Apollo-type near-Earth object, 2024 YR_{4} orbits the Sun on an elliptical orbit that crosses Earth's orbit. Since its close approach in December 2024, the asteroid has an orbital period of about 3.99 years (1,458 d) and an orbital inclination of 3.41 degrees with respect to Earth's orbit (the ecliptic). The period, considered as an osculating element, dips slightly at the approach in December 2028 and then slowly rises to around 4.01 years (1,463 d) by 2031. Its orbit will be strongly perturbed at the close encounter of 2032. Astronomers Carlos and Raúl de la Fuente Marcos have proposed that 2024 YR_{4} could be related to a group of near-Earth asteroids on similar orbits that also have virtual impactors: 2017 UW_{5}, 2018 GG_{4}, 2019 SC, and 2020 MQ_{61}. The 2015 Porangaba meteorite orbit has a 5% probability of matching that of 2024 YR_{4}.

Due to the Yarkovsky effect, 2024 YR_{4}'s retrograde rotation causes its orbit to shrink over time. This indicates 2024 YR_{4} originated farther out in the Solar System, specifically the central main asteroid belt. 2024 YR_{4}'s stony composition supports the possibility of an origin from the central main belt, since S-type and C-type asteroids are the most abundant spectral types in that region. The inward migration of 2024 YR_{4} from the main belt to near-Earth space was likely chaotic since the asteroid would have to cross multiple orbital resonances, such as the 3:1 mean-motion resonance with Jupiter's orbital period at 2.5 AU and the ν_{6} secular resonance with Saturn's orbital precession at 2.2 AU.

The asteroid reached perihelion (its closest approach to the Sun) on 22 November 2024, and made a close approach to Earth on 25 December 2024, two days before its discovery. During this encounter, 2024 YR_{4} passed 828,800 km (515,000 mi; 2.156 lunar distances) from Earth and then 488,300 km (303,400 mi; 1.270 LD) from the Moon. The asteroid will make its next close approach to Earth on 17 December 2028, when it will pass 8,020,000 km (4,980,000 mi; 20.9 LD) from Earth. The 2028 encounter will provide astronomers the opportunity to perform additional observations and extend the observation arc by two years.

Since the 2032 close approach is very close to the Moon, the resulting perturbation by the Earth–Moon system is highly uncertain, and all close approaches after 2032 are therefore not well constrained either. The 1 March 2025 position of the asteroid is (as of March 2026) now known with a 3-sigma uncertainty in the asteroid's position of ±16 km. By mid-2034, this increases to about 430 thousand km (270 thousand mi), but since 2024 YR_{4} will pass very close to the Moon in 2032, the post-2032 uncertainty may be even greater due to its trajectory being affected by gravitational focusing. The possible trajectories become more divergent with time and the greatest risk of an Earth impact (using data only through 2025) was in December 2047. Without the February 2026 observations, the uncertainty in the asteroid's position along its orbit in December 2047 was at least 2 billion km (13 AU) and wrapped around the asteroid's orbit. (Note: On the virtual impactor date of 2047-Dec-22, the nominal position of the asteroid is 1.1 AU from the Sun and 1.7 AU from Earth. The uncertainty in the asteroid's position along its orbit is 17 million kilometers, See also: NEODYS / Project Pluto) (Note: The circumference of a circular orbit with a semi-major axis of 2.5 AU would be 2π(2.5 AU) ≈ 16 AU.) Around January 2052 the asteroid could pass as close as 3 million km from Earth, but is expected to pass 25 million km from Earth. By the year 2123, the uncertainty in the asteroid's position is 4 AU (600 million km).

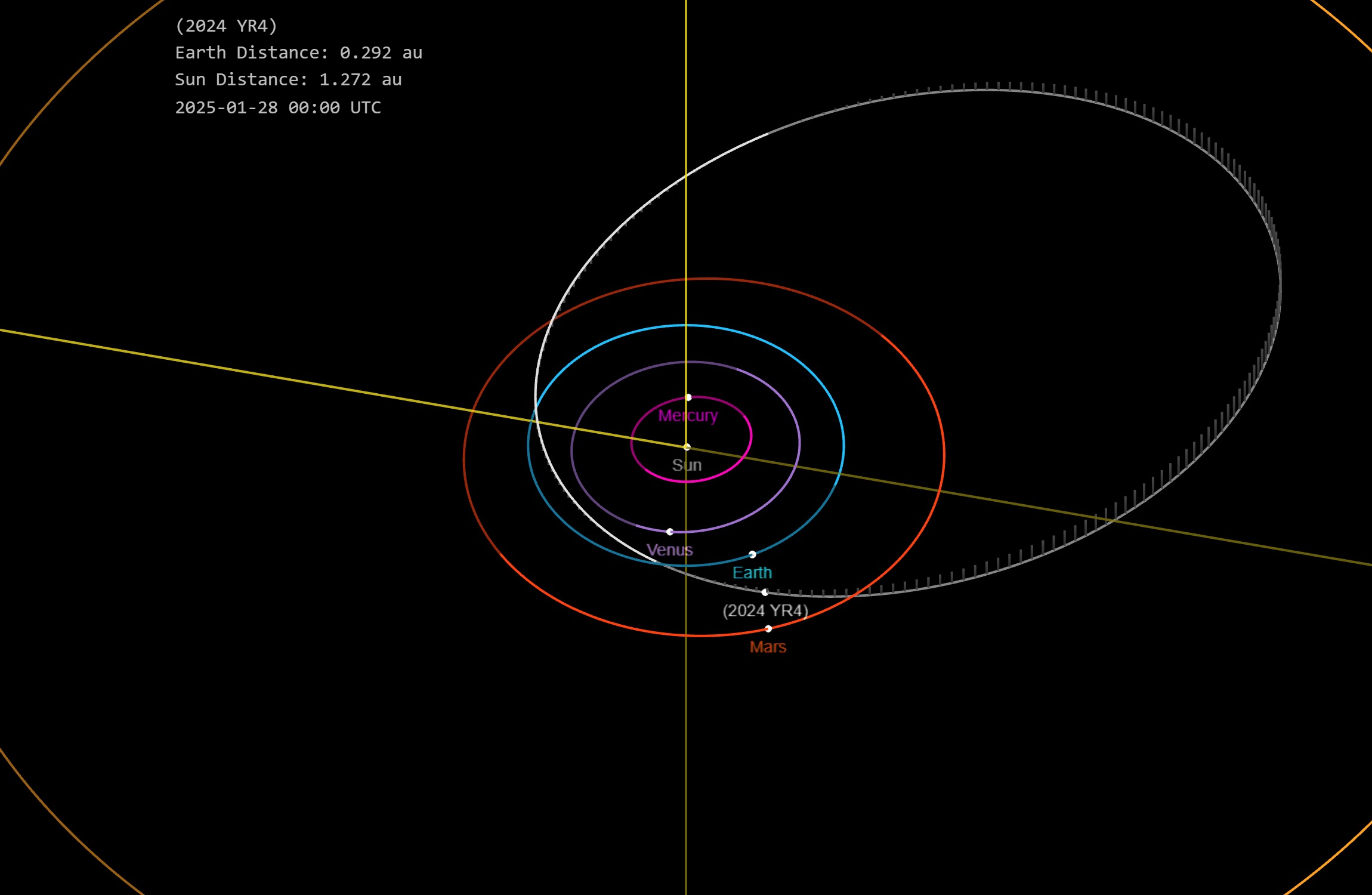
Diagram of 2024 YR_{4}'s orbit

Animation of 2024 YR_{4}'s trajectory from 2028 to 2036 (with 2036 being highly uncertain) (Note: In this older diagram, by mid-2036 the uncertainty in the asteroid's position along its orbit was ±230 million km (1.5 AU) or roughly 10% of the asteroid's orbit.)
- 2024 YR_{4}
- Sun
- Mercury
- Venus
- Earth
- Mars

Animation of 2024 YR_{4} around the Earth showing its 2032 close approach
2024 YR_{4} · Moon · Earth ·

== 2032 close approach ==
On 22 December 2032, 2024 YR_{4} will come closest to Earth at 08:22 ± 3 minutes UTC, (Note: ESA also lists a 3-sigma uncertainty of ± 3 minutes (1-sigma = <1 min) for the 2032 Earth closest approach time.) at a distance of 278,000 km (173,000 mi), with a 3-sigma uncertainty of 2,200 km (1,400 mi). The nominal closest approach to the Moon occurs at 14:57 UTC, with a nominal distance of about 22,900 km (14,200 mi) from the center of the Moon.

Animation showing the decreasing width of the uncertainty in 2024 YR_{4}'s position during its 22 December 2032 close approach to Earth and the Moon

Due to 2024 YR_{4}'s size and previously greater-than-1% impact probability, it reached a rating of 3 on the Torino scale on 27 January 2025, which prompted the International Asteroid Warning Network to issue a notice on 29 January 2025. This was the second-highest Torino rating ever reached by an asteroid, behind 99942 Apophis which in late 2004 briefly reached a similar impact probability, but had a rating of 4 due to its larger size. NASA's Sentry gave 2024 YR_{4} a rating on the Palermo scale as high as −0.18 on 18 February 2025, when it had a 55-day observation arc and a 3.1% chance of impacting the Earth in 2032. This gave 2024 YR_{4} a corresponding impact hazard of 66% of the background hazard level, given the asteroid's relatively small size of 60 metres (200 ft). (Note: The largest potentially hazardous asteroid discovered in 2024 is 2024 YU_{4}, with an assumed diameter near 500 m (1,600 ft). The near-Earth asteroid 2024 YK_{11} (H=17.6) is around 1 km (0.62 mi) in diameter assuming a generic albedo of 0.15.) The asteroid approached but never exceeded the background risk of a random asteroid of the same size impacting Earth by 2032, which by definition corresponds to a Palermo rating of 0. On 18 February 2025, the European Space Agency's Aegis listed a 2.8% chance of an Earth impact in 2032. On 23 February 2025 (with a 60-day observation arc), 2024 YR_{4} was reduced to a Torino rating of 0.

On 2 April 2025, with a 91-day observation arc, NASA removed the chance of a 2032 Earth impact. The European Space Agency removed the chance of a 2032 impact on 8 March 2025. NEODyS removed the chance of a 2032 impact on 1 March 2025.

JPL #79 nominal distance at the 22 December 2032 14:02 UT Virtual Impactor Scenario (not closest approach)
JPL Horizons nominal geocentric distance (AU)	uncertainty region (3-sigma)
0.0026 AU (390,000 km; 1.0 LD)	± 3 thousand km (Note: The uncertainty region is larger at the 14:02 UT Virtual Impactor Scenario because it is about 5 hours after the nominal (best-fit) Earth approach.)

Evolution of nominal Earth close-approach estimates for 22 December 2032

Solution	Observation arc (in days)	JPL Horizons nominal geocentric distance (AU)	uncertainty region (3-sigma)	Impact probability	Torino scale	Palermo scale (max)
2024 Dec 30	2 (53 obs)			1:1040 (0.096%)	1	−1.73
2024 Dec 31	3 (71 obs)			1:920 (0.11%)	1	−1.66
2025 Jan 1	4 (87 obs)			1:870 (0.11%)	1	−1.64
2025 Jan 2	6 (109 obs)			1:842 (0.12%)	1	−1.63
2025 Jan 3	7 (120 obs)			1:760 (0.13%)	1	−1.61
JPL #14 2025 Jan 6	8 (145 obs)	0.01706 AU (2.552 million km; 6.64 LD)	± 9.62 million km	1:730 (0.14%)	1	
JPL #15 2025 Jan 6	11 (158 obs)	0.01537 AU (2.299 million km; 5.98 LD)	± 9.55 million km	1:710 (0.14%)	1	−1.53
2025 Jan 11	14 (170 obs)			1:630 (0.16%)	1	−1.53
JPL #27 2025 Jan 20	26 (198 obs)			1:320 (0.31%)	1	
JPL #30 2025 Jan 22	28 (213 obs)	0.00068 AU (102,000 km; 0.26 LD) (Note: JPL #30 with a 28-day observation arc had an uncertainty of almost ± 3 days for the Earth close approach date in 2032.)	± 3.37 million km	1:190 (0.52%)	1	−0.93
JPL #32 2025 Jan 23	29 (219 obs)	0.00171 AU (256,000 km; 0.67 LD) (Note: JPL #32 The nominal orbit is 1,129 km from the center of the Moon, which is 65% of the Moon's radius of 1,737 km.)	± 2.28 million km	1:110 (0.91%)	1	−0.69
JPL #34 2025 Jan 24	30 (227 obs)	0.00113 AU (169,000 km; 0.44 LD)	± 1.96 million km	1:110 (0.91%)	1	−0.69
JPL #35 2025 Jan 27	33 (238 obs)	0.00004564 AU (6,829 km; 0.01776 LD) (Note: JPL #35: The nominal 14:17 UT Earth approach is 6829 km (1.07 R_{🜨}) and Earth has a radius of 6378 km.)	± 1.605 million km	1:83 (1.2%)	3	−0.57
JPL #36 2025 Jan 28	34 (245 obs)	0.00071 AU (106,000 km; 0.28 LD)	± 1.55 million km	1:83 (1.2%)	3	−0.56
JPL #37 2025 Jan 29	35 (257 obs)	0.00085 AU (127,000 km; 0.33 LD)	± 1.408 million km	1:77 (1.3%)	3	−0.53
JPL #39 2025 Jan 30	36 (261 obs)	0.00087 AU (130,000 km; 0.34 LD)	± 1.408 million km	1:77 (1.3%)	3	−0.53
JPL #40 2025 Jan 31	37 (276 obs)	0.00046 AU (69,000 km; 0.18 LD)	± 1.2 million km	1:63 (1.6%)	3	−0.47
JPL #41 2025 Feb 1	38 (284 obs)	0.00037 AU (55,000 km; 0.14 LD)	± 1.119 million km	1:59 (1.7%)	3	−0.43
JPL #42 2025 Feb 2	39 (289 obs)	0.00185 AU (277,000 km; 0.72 LD)	± 1.049 million km	1:71 (1.4%)	3	−0.52
JPL #43 2025 Feb 3	40 (292 obs)	0.00165 AU (247,000 km; 0.64 LD)	± 998,000 km	1:67 (1.5%)	3	−0.49
JPL #44 2025 Feb 4	41 (294 obs)	0.00151 AU (226,000 km; 0.59 LD)	± 981,000 km	1:63 (1.6%)	3	−0.46
JPL #45 2025 Feb 5	42 (307 obs)	0.00116 AU (174,000 km; 0.45 LD)	± 892,000 km	1:53 (1.9%)	3	−0.40
JPL #46 2025 Feb 6	43 (315 obs)	0.00059 AU (88,000 km; 0.23 LD)	± 819,000 km	1:43 (2.3%)	3	−0.31
JPL #47 2025 Feb 7	43 (325 obs)	0.00080 AU (120,000 km; 0.31 LD)	± 792,000 km	1:45 (2.2%)	3	−0.32
JPL #48 2025 Feb 8	44 (336 obs)	0.00061 AU (91,000 km; 0.24 LD)	± 764,000 km	1:42 (2.4%)	3	−0.29
JPL #49 2025 Feb 9	45 (343 obs)	0.00105 AU (157,000 km; 0.41 LD)	± 739,000 km	1:45 (2.2%)	3	−0.34
JPL #50 2025 Feb 10	45 (347 obs)	0.00112 AU (168,000 km; 0.44 LD) (Note: 2024 YR_{4} could not be observed at that time because of proximity to the full moon)	± 712,000 km	1:48 (2.1%)	3	−0.34
JPL #51 2025 Feb 12	45 (348 obs)	0.00114 AU (171,000 km; 0.44 LD)	± 712,000 km	1:48 (2.1%)	3	−0.35
JPL #53 2025 Feb 13	45 (346 obs)	0.00112 AU (168,000 km; 0.44 LD)	± 712,000 km	1:48 (2.1%)	3	−0.34
JPL #54 2025 Feb 14	45 (354 obs)	0.00105 AU (157,000 km; 0.41 LD)	± 707,000 km	1:45 (2.2%)	3	−0.33
JPL #55 2025 Feb 15	45 (363 obs)	0.00105 AU (157,000 km; 0.41 LD)	± 707,000 km	1:45 (2.2%)	3	−0.33
JPL #56 2025 Feb 17	54 (368 obs)	0.00099 AU (148,000 km; 0.39 LD)	± 481,000 km	1:38 (2.6%)	3	−0.25
JPL #57 2025 Feb 18	55 (370 obs)	0.00082 AU (123,000 km; 0.32 LD)	± 458,000 km	1:32 (3.1%)	3	−0.18
JPL #58 2025 Feb 19	56 (378 obs)	0.00145 AU (217,000 km; 0.56 LD)	± 356,000 km (Note: A 1-sigma value for JPL Horizons uncertainty region would not overlap Earth's position.)	1:95 (1.06%)	3	−0.66
JPL #59 2025 Feb 19	56 (376 obs)	0.00133 AU (199,000 km; 0.52 LD)	± 379,000 km	1:67 (1.5%) (Note: On 19 February 2025, the Sigma VI value increased from 0.8 to 1.6 meaning the nominal orbit became a poorer match for the impacting orbit. On 28 January 2025, Sigma VI was 0.2.)	3	−0.51
JPL #60 2025 Feb 20	57 (391 obs)	0.00161 AU (241,000 km; 0.63 LD)	± 291,000 km	1:370 (0.27%) (Note: On 20 February 2025, the Sigma VI value increased from 1.6 to 2.5.)	1	−1.23
JPL #61 2025 Feb 21	58 (392 obs)	0.00153 AU (229,000 km; 0.60 LD)	± 287,000 km	1:280 (0.36%)	1	−1.11
JPL #62 2025 Feb 22	59 (404 obs)	0.00147 AU (220,000 km; 0.57 LD)	± 275,000 km	1:280 (0.36%)	1	−1.11
JPL #63 2025 Feb 23	60 (418 obs)	0.00179 AU (268,000 km; 0.70 LD)	± 207,000 km (Note: The 3-sigma value for JPL Horizons uncertainty region would not overlap Earth's position.)	1:26,000 (0.004%) (Note: On 23 February 2025, the Sigma VI value increased to 3.96.)	0	−3.08
JPL #64 2025 Feb 24	61 (424 obs)	0.00182 AU (272,000 km; 0.71 LD)	± 199,000 km	1:59,000 (0.002%)	0	−3.45
JPL #66 2025 Feb 26	63 (428 obs)	0.00180 AU (269,000 km; 0.70 LD)	± 193,000 km	1:91,000 (0.001%)	0	−3.61
JPL #67 2025 Feb 27	63 (440 obs)	0.00180 AU (269,000 km; 0.70 LD)	± 192,000 km	1:91,000 (0.001%)	0	−3.61
JPL #68 2025 Feb 28	65 (441 obs)	0.00183 AU (274,000 km; 0.71 LD)	± 192,000 km	1:130,000 (0.00076%)	0	−3.78
JPL #69 2025 Mar 01	66 (442 obs)	0.00182 AU (272,000 km; 0.71 LD)	± 191,000 km	1:120,000 (0.00082%)	0	−3.75
JPL #70 2025 Mar 07	71 (444 obs)	0.00180 AU (269,000 km; 0.70 LD)	± 176,000 km	1:500,000 (0.0002%) (Note: As of JPL #70 on 7 March 2025, the impact risk in 2047 is now technically greater with a palermo rating of −4.3 and a 1-in-150,000 risk of impact.)	0	−4.36
JPL #71 2025 Mar 08	71 (452 obs)	0.00177 AU (265,000 km; 0.69 LD)	± 167,000 km	1:910,000 (0.0001%)	0	−4.61
JPL #72 2025 Mar 11	71 (453 obs)	0.00174 AU (260,000 km; 0.68 LD)	± 159,000 km	1:1,800,000 (0.000055%)	0	−4.93
JPL #73 2025 Mar 13	71 (460 obs)	0.00175 AU (262,000 km; 0.68 LD)	± 154,000 km	1:5,000,000 (0.000020%) (Note: On 13 March 2025, the Sigma VI value increased to 5.2.)	0	−5.37
JPL #74 2025 Mar 18	71 (460 obs)	0.00175 AU (262,000 km; 0.68 LD)	± 154,000 km	1:5,300,000 (0.000019%)	0	−5.38
JPL #75 2025 Apr 1	88 (462 obs)	0.00172 AU (257,000 km; 0.67 LD)	± 118,000 km		0	
JPL #76 2025 Apr 2	91 (473 obs)	0.00174 AU (260,000 km; 0.68 LD)	± 82,600 km	not applicable	not applicable	not applicable
JPL #77 2025 Apr 3	91 (476 obs)	0.00174 AU (260,000 km; 0.68 LD)	± 82,600 km			
JPL #78 2025 Jun 3	137 (477 obs)	0.00178 AU (266,000 km; 0.69 LD)	± 69,100 km			
JPL #79 2026 Mar 5	428 (485 obs)	0.00186 AU (278,000 km; 0.72 LD)	± 2,200 km			

=== Potential impact effects ===
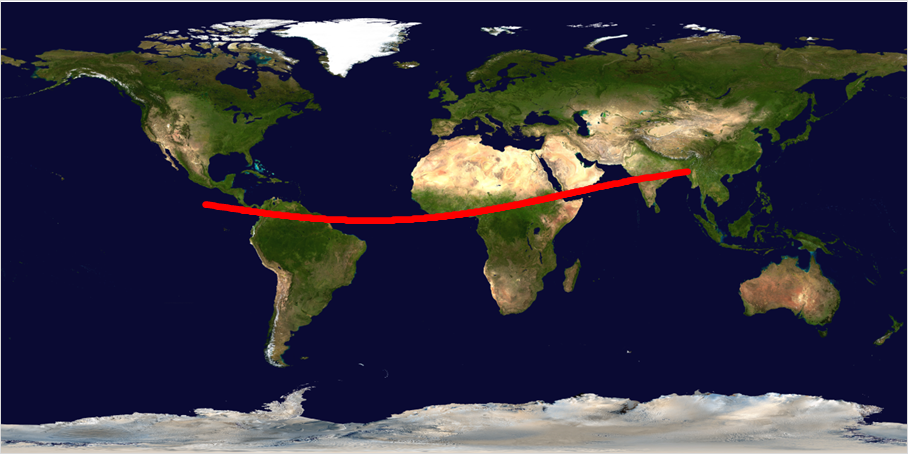
Impact risk corridor (generated on 27 January 2025) for 2024 YR_{4}'s close approach on 22 December 2032

As of late January 2025, the risk corridor of 2024 YR_{4}'s possible impact locations in 2032, estimated from the existing observations, began from the eastern equatorial Pacific Ocean, ran through northern South America, the equatorial Atlantic Ocean, Nigeria, central Africa, the north of eastern Africa, the southwest corner of the Arabian Peninsula, the northwestern Indian Ocean, India, and ended in Bangladesh. Using NASA's estimated diameter, mass, and density for 2024 YR_{4}, the asteroid would have released energy equivalent to 7.7 megatonnes of TNT (32.2 petajoules) if it had been to impact Earth at its predicted velocity at atmospheric entry of 17.20 km/s (10.69 mi/s), equivalent to about 500 times the energy released by Little Boy (the atomic bomb dropped on Hiroshima), two and a half times of Grapple Y, 50% of Castle Bravo, or 15% of Tsar Bomba.

Due to its stony composition, this would have more likely produced a meteor air burst than an impact crater (for an impact on land) or tsunami (for an oceanic impact). It could have caused damage as far as 50 km (30 mi) from the impact site. Despite its potential to cause damage if it were to impact, 2024 YR_{4} is not categorized as a potentially hazardous object (PHO) because it has an absolute magnitude dimmer than 22, which usually means that such an asteroid is less than 140 m (460 ft) in diameter and its potential damage therefore would be localized.

=== Possible impact on the Moon ===
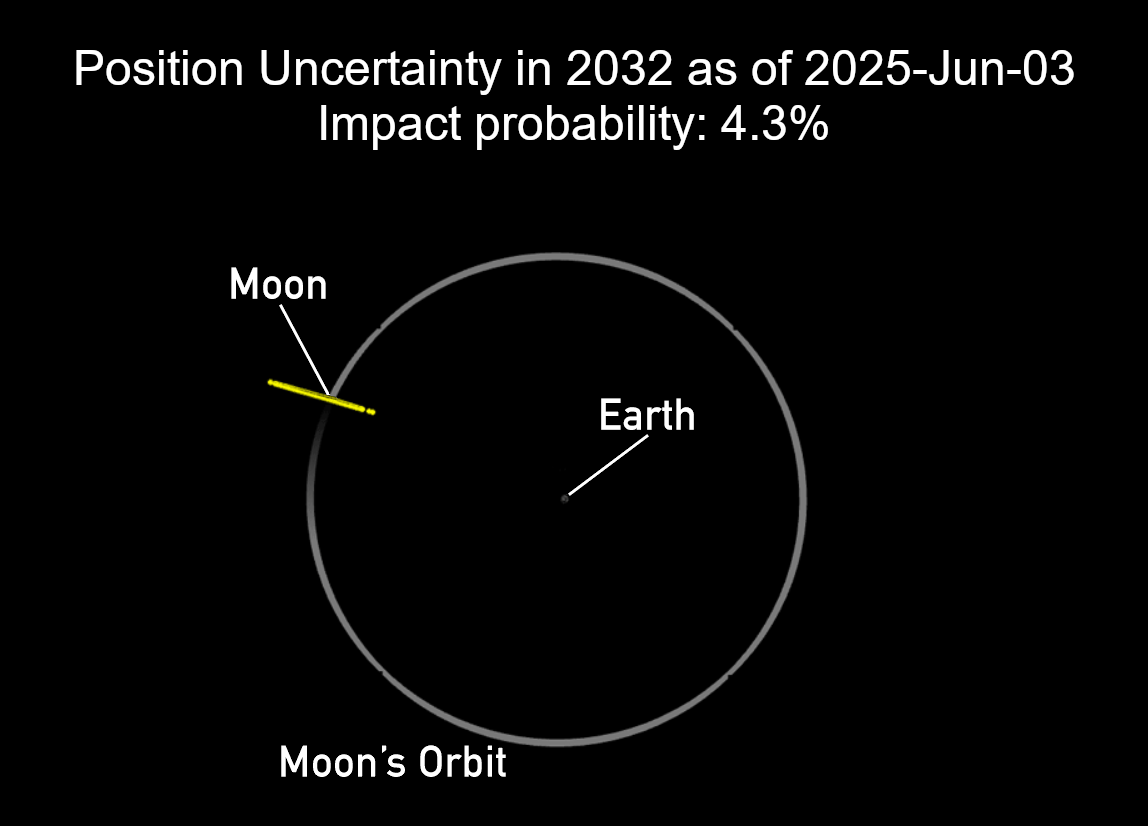
The possible locations – represented by yellow points – of asteroid 2024 YR_{4} on 22 December 2032, as of 3 June 2025

On March 5, 2026, NASA and ESA announced that new JWST observations in February eliminated the chance of a lunar impact. However, for almost a year, the chance stood at around 4%. Using observations through 11 May 2025, 2024 YR_{4} had a 4.3% chance of impacting a 70% waning gibbous moon on 22 December 2032 around 15:17 to 15:21 UTC. Observations by the James Webb Space Telescope on 11 May 2025 reduced the Earth approach uncertainty region by 20% (Note: The Earth close approach uncertainty region decreased from 83 000 km to 69 000 km.) and increased the odds of a Moon impact from 3.8% to 4.3%. The current updated nominal approach to the Moon is at around 14:56 UTC ± 2 minutes at a distance of 22,900 km (14,200 mi; 0.060 LD) from the center of the Moon, or about 21,200 km above the Moon's surface, with a 3-sigma uncertainty of 2,300 km (1,400 mi).

JPL #79 nominal distance from the Moon at 22 December 2032 15:19 UT Moon Impact Scenario (not closest approach)
JPL Horizons nominal lunar distance (AU)	uncertainty region (3-sigma)
0.000199 AU (29,800 km; 0.077 LD)	± 3 thousand km

The impact could have created a crater with a diameter of 500 to 2,000 metres (0.31 to 1.24 mi) on the lunar surface, releasing the equivalent of 5.2 megatonnes of TNT (21.8 petajoules) in energy if it had impacted the Moon at an estimated velocity of 13.9 km/s (8.6 mi/s), an explosion about 340 times more powerful than the Hiroshima bomb. The impact corridor was a line that extended through the southern parts of Mare Humorum and Mare Nubium. It is estimated that such an impact would send approximately 100,000 tons of debris into space. This cloud of debris could result in an extraordinary meteor shower and also pose a hazard for artificial Earth satellites.

Michael Busch of the SETI Institute notes that an explosion on the Moon "would be very obvious to any spacecraft observing from lunar orbit" but may not be as visible to the unaided eye from Earth due to the Moon's brightness. However, other astronomers believe the impact could be visible from Earth. Gareth Collins suggested that "the impact flash of vaporized rock would be visible from Earth, even in the daytime", while Daniel Bamberger of the Northolt Branch Observatories in London stated that the impact "could be brighter than the full moon" making it clearly visible to the naked eye.

Evolution of nominal lunar close approach estimates for 2032

Solution	Observation arc (in days)	JPL Horizons nominal lunar distance (AU)	uncertainty region (3-sigma)
JPL #30 2025 Jan 22	28 (213 obs)	0.00114 AU (171,000 km; 0.44 LD)	± 3300000 km
JPL #32 2025 Jan 23	29 (219 obs)	0.00000754 AU (1,128 km; 0.00293 LD)	± 2200000 km
JPL #63 2025 Feb 23	60 (418 obs)	0.0000786 AU (11,760 km; 0.0306 LD)	± 220000 km
JPL #64 2025 Feb 24	61 (424 obs)	0.000107 AU (16,000 km; 0.042 LD) (Note: JPL #64 The minimum possible Moon distance is 1,013 km, which is 58% of Moon's radius of 1,737 km.)	± 212000 km
JPL #66 2025 Feb 26	63 (428 obs)	0.0000902 AU (13,490 km; 0.0351 LD)	± 205000 km
JPL #67 2025 Feb 27	63 (440 obs)	0.0000910 AU (13,610 km; 0.0354 LD)	± 205000 km
JPL #68 2025 Feb 28	65 (441 obs)	0.000126 AU (18,800 km; 0.049 LD)	± 205000 km
JPL #69 2025 Mar 01	66 (442 obs)	0.000113 AU (16,900 km; 0.044 LD)	± 204000 km
JPL #70 2025 Mar 07	71 (444 obs)	0.000091 AU (13,600 km; 0.035 LD)	± 187000 km
JPL #71 2025 Mar 08	71 (452 obs)	0.000054 AU (8,100 km; 0.021 LD)	± 178000 km
JPL #72 2025 Mar 11	71 (453 obs)	0.00002256 AU (3,375 km; 0.00878 LD)	± 162000 km
JPL #73 2025 Mar 13	428 (460 obs)	0.00003719 AU (5,564 km; 0.01447 LD)	± 162000 km
JPL #74 2025 Mar 18	71 (460 obs)	0.00003772 AU (5,643 km; 0.01468 LD)	± 162000 km
JPL #75 2025 Apr 1	88 (462 obs)	0.00000798 AU (1,194 km; 0.00311 LD) (Note: JPL #75 The nominal orbit is 1,195 km from the center of the Moon, which is 69% of the Moon's radius of 1,737 km.)	± 66000 km
JPL #76 2025 Apr 2	91 (473 obs)	0.00002044 AU (3,058 km; 0.00795 LD)	± 83000 km
JPL #77 2025 Apr 3	91 (476 obs)	0.00002067 AU (3,092 km; 0.00804 LD)	± 83000 km
JPL #78 2025 Jun 3	137 (477 obs)	0.00007140 AU (10,681 km; 0.02779 LD) (Note: JPL #78: 9000±74000 km from the surface of the Moon.)	± 74000 km
JPL #79 2026 Mar 5	428 (485 obs)	0.00015331 AU (22,935 km; 0.05966 LD) (Note: JPL #79: 21200±2300 km from the surface of the Moon.)	± 2300 km

== Observation opportunities ==
=== 2025 ===
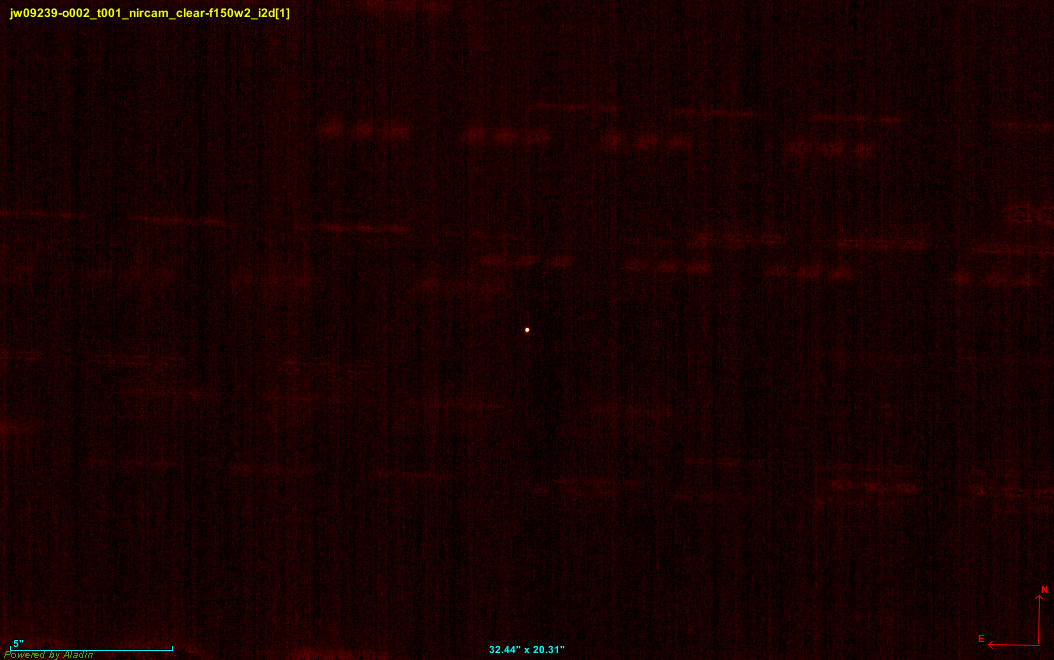
2024 YR_{4} imaged by JWST's NIRCam on 8 March 2025

Additional observations of 2024 YR_{4} reduced the uncertainties in its trajectory. Because the asteroid was already moving away from Earth when it was discovered, it was becoming fainter, necessitating the use of larger-aperture telescopes such as the 10-meter Keck telescope and the Very Large Telescope. As of 14 March 2025 the asteroid had reached apparent magnitude 26, which is 63 million times fainter than what can be observed with the naked eye. (Note: Math: 2.512^{(26 − 6.5)} = 63151385) As of the last ground−based observation on 23 March 2025 by Paranal Observatory, the asteroid was 1.8 AU from the Sun which is just beyond the orbit of Mars. The asteroid was not observed between 11–13 January and 8–15 February 2025 due to interference from moonlight. After mid-February, a 2-meter telescope or better was required. After 4 March 2025, a 4-meter or better class telescope became required. After 1 April, an 8-meter or larger was required. Space-based infrared telescopes like the JWST were able to observe 2024 YR_{4} at farther distances until mid-May. The JWST observed 2024 YR_{4} on 8 March, when the position of the asteroid first became compatible with the pointing restrictions of the telescope, then 26 March, and observed it a final time on 11 May 2025, those observations likely being the last of the asteroid before its upcoming 2028 approach. JWST has used its NIRCam and Mid-Infrared Instrument to measure 2024 YR_{4}'s position, infrared thermal emission, and size.

=== Precovery ===
The orbital uncertainty of 2024 YR_{4} would be further reduced by precovery observations, in which the asteroid would be detected in archival telescope images taken before its discovery. The earliest known precovery observation of 2024 YR_{4} was by ATLAS on 25 December 2024, but this is just two days before its discovery and the measured position of the asteroid in that observation is more uncertain than in later observations, due to the rapid motion of the asteroid and a longer exposure than would have been optimal for observations of such a fast-moving asteroid. (Note: The 25 December 2024 observation has a high RMS of 1.6 arcseconds in right ascension and 0.7 arcseconds in declination.) The asteroid passed 11.4 million km of Earth on 8 September 2016 and 20.8 million km of Earth on 26 October 2020. A search through 2016 Subaru Telescope archival images did not find 2024 YR_{4} in part of the sky region where it should have been. A search of Intermediate Palomar Transient Factory archives by Sam Deen may have located the asteroid from 2016 which would extend the observation arc by 8 years (3067 days) and increase the observation arc from 428 days to about 3495 days.

Astronomers of the Catalina Sky Survey inspected a set of images from Mount Lemmon Survey, including images containing the virtual impactor's predicted location, and similarly found no candidates. Astronomers of the Pan-STARRS survey identified a few images in 2012, 2016 and 2020, again with no candidates found, alongside images from 2012 and 2020 which did not have a sufficiently deep limiting magnitude to detect 2024 YR4 at its predicted magnitude on those dates. Paolo Tanga checked for possible detections by the Gaia spacecraft, but concluded that 2024 YR_{4} never came within the spacecraft's field of view. James Bauer checked the NEOWISE data, Deborah Woods checked Space Surveillance Telescope data, and Julien de Wit searched data from TESS and other exoplanet surveys; none of these searches found detections of 2024 YR_{4}.

=== Stellar occultation ===
A positive occultation detection would make possible measurements of the size and shape of the asteroid and more precise measurements of its position. As of 11 February 2025, no positive stellar occultation had been reported. A 6 February occultation had its path very close to the Connecticut–Rhode Island border, and no occultation results have been reported so far. An 8 February occultation passed Xiamen, China; Chenyang Guo reported negative results from two locations. The uncertainty range for the path of both occultations on Earth was a few kilometers wide, and while Fresnel diffraction broadens the penumbra to slightly more than twice the diameter of the asteroid—to 100 and 140 m (330 and 460 ft)—an uncertainty of a few kilometers is still too wide compared to this penumbra to efficiently place movable observing stations across the path.

=== 2026 ===
The JWST was once again allotted time on its NIRCam on 17 February and 26 February 2026 in an attempt to further refine the asteroid's orbit. By observing the asteroid move in the vicinity of stars captured in the GAIA catalog the observation arc was extended by 291 days, from 137 days to 428 days, which was enough to rule out the possibility of the asteroid impacting the Moon, from the previous chance of 4%.

=== 2028 ===
Observations of the asteroid when it passes near Earth again in 2028 will extend the observation arc by two years. This will enable the calculation of a very precise orbit, enabling higher accuracy prediction of the post-2032 trajectory, after close interaction with the Earth–Moon system. The asteroid will be too faint for observation until June 2028. It will be about magnitude 25 when it comes to opposition on 19 July 2028 at an Earth distance of 0.78 AU (117 million km) and it will continue to get closer until 17 December when it will pass about 20.8 LD (8.0 million km; 5.0 million mi) from Earth.

== Defense ==
Had the observations not ruled out a 2032 Earth impact with a 5-sigma confidence, an asteroid deflection mission similar to DART might have been sent to 2024 YR_{4} to avert its impact. However, mounting such a mission with less than eight years to design and construct a spacecraft would have been challenging. A mission could be prepared before the 2028 close encounter so that it would be ready to launch if it is determined that an impact is likely. Alternatively, if deflection were unfeasible and the predicted site of impact were on or close to a continent, it could be evacuated.

== See also ==
- Asteroid impact avoidance
