= (614433) 2009 KK =

Apollo near-Earth asteroid

Discovery
- Discovered by: Catalina Sky Survey
- Discovery site: Summerhaven, Arizona, USA
- Discovery date: May 7, 2009

Designations
- Alternative designations: MPO 218092
- Minor planet category: Apollo NEO

Orbital characteristics
- Epoch 4 September 2017 (JD 2458000.5)
- Uncertainty parameter 1
- Observation arc: 953 d
- Aphelion: 2.18591 AU (327.007 Gm)
- Perihelion: 0.81835 AU (122.423 Gm)
- Semi-major axis: 1.50213 AU (224.715 Gm)
- Eccentricity: 0.45521
- Orbital period (sidereal): 1.84 yr (672.452 d); 1.84 yr
- Mean anomaly: 143.59°
- Mean motion: 0° 32^{m} 6.756^{s} /day
- Inclination: 18.2159°
- Longitude of ascending node: 68.1587°
- Argument of perihelion: 247.32°
- Earth MOID: 0.0000955542 AU (14,294.70 km)
- Mercury MOID: 0.3949 AU (59,080,000 km)
- Jupiter MOID: 3.23017 AU (483.227 Gm)

Physical characteristics
- Absolute magnitude (H): 20.5

(614433) 2009 KK is an Apollo near-Earth asteroid which was listed for several weeks in May and June 2009 on the Sentry Risk Table with a Torino Scale rating of 1. There was a 1 in 10000 chance of an impact on 29 May 2022. On 22 May 2009, it was listed as one of two near-earth objects assessed above Level 0 for potential impacts within 100 years, the other being 2007 VK184. As of 10 June 2009 it was downgraded to Level 0 as the cumulative Earth-impact probability was assessed as 7.9e-06 or 1 in 127,000. On 17 June 2009, JPL removed 2009 KK from the list of potential Earth impactors. It is now known that on 4 May 2022 the asteroid was 0.475 AU (71,100,000 km; 44,200,000 mi) from Earth.

== 2194 passage ==
2009 KK may pass as close as 0.006 AU (900,000 km; 560,000 mi) from Earth on 2194-Jun-02. But the nominal solution shows the asteroid passing 0.038 AU (5,700,000 km; 3,500,000 mi) from Earth.
