= 2023 GQ2 =

Near-Earth asteroid

2023 GQ_{2}
Discovery
- Discovery site: Bok Telescope @ Kitt Peak National Observatory
- Discovery date: 12 April 2023

Designations
- Minor planet category: NEO; PHA; Apollo

Orbital characteristics
- Epoch 25 February 2023 (JD 2460000.5)
- Uncertainty parameter 3
- Observation arc: 3.93 years
- Earliest precovery date: 13 May 2019
- Aphelion: 2.305 AU
- Perihelion: 0.9837 AU
- Semi-major axis: 1.6444 AU
- Eccentricity: 0.4017
- Orbital period (sidereal): 2.11 yr (770.17 days)
- Mean anomaly: 106.38°
- Inclination: 36.84°
- Longitude of ascending node: 53.83°
- Time of perihelion: 2022-Jul-12
- Argument of perihelion: 349.34°
- Earth MOID: 0.0012 AU (180 thousand km; 0.47 LD)

Physical characteristics
- Dimensions: 290–650 meters; ≈400 m (1,300 ft)
- Absolute magnitude (H): 19.8±0.3 mag

2023 GQ_{2} is an asteroid roughly 400 meters in diameter, classified as a near-Earth object and potentially hazardous object of the Apollo group. It was first discovered on 12 April 2023, when it was 1.3 AU (190 million km) from Earth, with the Bok Telescope at Kitt Peak National Observatory. On 19 April 2023, with an observation arc of 6.7 days, it was rated 1 on the Torino scale for a virtual impactor on 16 November 2028 at 00:58 UTC. When it had a Palermo scale rating of –0.70, the odds of impact were about 5 times less than the background hazard level and this gave the asteroid one of the highest Palermo scale ratings ever issued. On 20 April 2023 precovery images from May 2019 were announced extending the observation arc to 3.9 years, and the 2028 virtual impactor was removed from the Sentry Risk Table. It is now known the nominal approach will safely occur about 13 hours after the impact scenario on 16 November 2028 13:36 ± 40 minutes.

The asteroid will come to aphelion (farthest distance from the Sun) around 1 August 2023.

== 2028 ==
With a short 6.7 day observation arc, virtual clones of the asteroid that fit the uncertainty region in the known trajectory showed a 1-in-24,000 chance that the asteroid could impact Earth on 16 November 2028 00:58 UT. With precovery images and a 3.9 year observation arc, the nominal approach (line of variation) has the asteroid 0.012 AU (1.8 million km) ± 94 thousand km from Earth at the time of the potential impact on 16 November 2028. The nominal closest approach will occur about 13 hours after the impact scenario on 16 November 2028 13:36 ± 40 minutes.

2023 GQ_{2} nominal approach for 16 November 2028 00:58 virtual impactor
Solution	Observation arc (in days)	JPL Horizons nominal geocentric distance (AU)	uncertainty region (3-sigma)	Impact probability	Torino scale	Palermo scale (max)
JPL #1 (2023-Apr-17)	5 (26 obs)	0.0085 AU (1.27 million km)	± 90 million km	1:560000	0	–2.08
JPL #3 (2023-Apr-19)	7 (29 obs)	0.0053 AU (0.79 million km)	± 16 million km	1:24000	1	–0.70
JPL #4 (2023-Apr-20)	1437 (35 obs)	0.0121 AU (1.81 million km)	± 0.094 million km	none	N/A	N/A

2023 GQ_{2} Earth approach on 16 November 2028 (about 13 hours after the impact scenario)
Date & time	Nominal distance	uncertainty region (3-sigma)
2028-Nov-16 13:36 ± 40 minutes	1522786 km	± 80 thousand km
