= 2013 TV135 =

Apollo near-Earth asteroid

2013 TV_{135}
Discovery (Note: The MPC circular lists Crimean Astrophysical Observatory (code 095) as the discovery site of the asteroid because Borisov had not registered his observatory MARGO (code L51) until 17 November 2013, which is a month after the discovery.)
- Discovered by: Gennadiy Borisov (L51)
- Discovery date: 12 October 2013

Designations
- Minor planet category: Apollo; NEO; PHA

Orbital characteristics
- Epoch 21 November 2025 (JD 2461000.5)
- Uncertainty parameter 0
- Observation arc: 3.77 yr (1377 days)
- Aphelion: 3.8680 AU (578.64 Gm) (Q)
- Perihelion: 0.98404 AU (147.210 Gm) (q)
- Semi-major axis: 2.4260 AU (362.92 Gm) (a)
- Eccentricity: 0.59437 (e)
- Orbital period (sidereal): 3.78 yr (1380.1 d)
- Mean anomaly: 78.71° (M)
- Mean motion: 0° 15^{m} 39.024^{s} / day (n)
- Inclination: 6.7453° (i)
- Longitude of ascending node: 333.31° (Ω)
- Argument of perihelion: 23.871° (ω)
- Earth MOID: 0.00330365 AU (494,219 km)
- Jupiter MOID: 1.60575 AU (240.217 Gm)

Physical characteristics
- Dimensions: ~450 meters (1,480 ft)
- Mass: 1.2×10^{11} kg (assumed)
- Absolute magnitude (H): 19.5

2013 TV_{135} is an Apollo near-Earth asteroid and potentially hazardous object estimated to have a diameter of 450 meters (1,480 ft). On 16 September 2013, it passed about 0.0448 AU (6,700,000 km; 4,160,000 mi) from Earth. On 20 September 2013, it came to perihelion (closest approach to the Sun). The asteroid was discovered on 12 October 2013 by Ukrainian amateur astronomer Gennadiy Borisov with a custom 0.2-meter (7.9 in) telescope using images dating back to 8 October 2013. It was rated level 1 on the Torino Scale from 16 October 2013 until JPL solution 26 on 3 November 2013. It reached a Palermo scale rating of -0.73. It was removed from the JPL Sentry Risk Table on 8 November 2013 using JPL solution 32 with an observation arc of 27 days.

== Past Earth-impact estimates ==
On 16 October 2013, near-Earth asteroid 2013 TV_{135} (with a short observation arc of 7 days) was listed on the JPL Sentry Risk Table with 1 in 63,000 chance of impacting Earth on 26 August 2032. This gave the asteroid a Torino Scale rating of 1. The peak estimated threat from the asteroid occurred 19–20 October 2013 when Leonid Elenin and NEODyS estimated the odds of impact to be 0.03% (1 in 3,800). On 31 October 2013, NEODyS estimated the odds of impact to be 1 in 4,330 and the Sentry Risk Table estimated the odds of impact to be 1 in 6,250. On 7 November 2013, with a short observation arc of 25 days, the Sentry Risk Table estimated it had about a 1 in 169,492,000 chance of an Earth impact on 26 August 2032. It was removed from the JPL Sentry Risk Table on 8 November 2013 using JPL solution 32 with an observation arc of 27 days.

As of February 10, 2014, the NEODyS nominal best-fit orbit shows that 2013 TV_{135} will be 0.76 AU (114,000,000 km; 71,000,000 mi) from Earth on 26 August 2032.

== Orbit ==
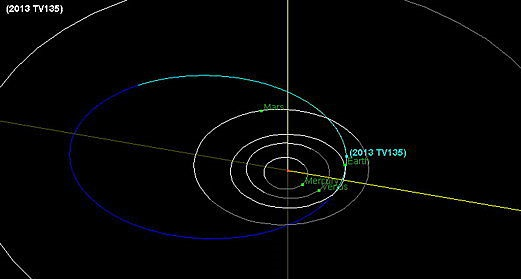

With an orbital inclination of only 6.7 degrees and perihelion 0.98 AU from the Sun, the point of perihelion is controlled by close approaches to Earth. The asteroid has a long observation arc spanning nearly 4 years and has a well-defined orbit, with an Uncertainty of 0. Given the relatively large size of the asteroid, astronomers were able to refine the orbit of this asteroid over several months.

== Impact effects ==
An Earth impact would have the kinetic energy of 3,200 megatons of TNT, approximately 60 times the energy of Russia's 50 Mt Tsar Bomba. This would also be equivalent to 16 times the 1883 eruption of Krakatoa which was 200 Mt and had a Volcanic Explosivity Index of 6.

== See also ==
- Asteroid impact avoidance
- List of asteroid close approaches to Earth
- Torino scale
