= 2022 BX1 =

Near-Earth asteroid 2022

2022 BX_{1}
Discovery
- Discovered by: Mount Lemmon Survey
- Discovery date: 25 January 2022

Designations
- Minor planet category: Apollo; NEO; PHA

Orbital characteristics
- Epoch 2025-Nov-21 (JD 2461000.5)
- Uncertainty parameter 0
- Observation arc: 761 days (2.08 years)
- Aphelion: 2.1553 AU (Q)
- Perihelion: 0.8694 AU (q)
- Semi-major axis: 1.5124 AU (a)
- Eccentricity: 0.4252 (e)
- Orbital period (sidereal): 1.8599 years
- Mean anomaly: 331.74° (M)
- Inclination: 2.9531° (i)
- Longitude of ascending node: 289.67° (Ω)
- Time of perihelion: 25 April 2022
- Argument of perihelion: 300.65° (ω)
- Earth MOID: 0.00105 AU (157 thousand km; 0.41 LD)
- Jupiter MOID: 2.844 AU (425.5 million km)

Physical characteristics
- Dimensions: ~150 m (500 ft); 120–270 meters
- Absolute magnitude (H): 21.7

2022 BX_{1} is a potentially hazardous asteroid around 200 meters in diameter that was discovered on 25 January 2022 when it was 0.36 AU (54 million km) from Earth. On 29 January 2022 with an observation arc of 22 days it was rated with a Torino scale of 1 for a virtual impactor on 11 July 2061 21:22 UTC. The 2061 virtual impactor was ruled out on 9 February 2022 with a 32.9 day observation arc. Nominal approach is expected to occur 18 June 2061.

2022 BX1 nominal approach for 11 July 2061 virtual impactor
Observation arc (in days)	JPL Horizons nominal geocentric distance (AU)	uncertainty region (3-sigma)	Impact probability (1 in)	Torino scale
19.9	n/a	n/a	47000	0
22.0	0.09 AU (13 million km)	± 62 million km	7700	1
23.9	0.17 AU (25 million km)	± 61 million km	22000	0
24.1	0.27 AU (40 million km)	± 61 million km	77000	0
26.5	0.20 AU (30 million km)	± 37 million km	480000	0
29.0	0.15 AU (22 million km)	± 29 million km	1.7 million	0
31.0	0.15 AU (22 million km)	± 27 million km	5.3 million	0
32.9	0.16 AU (24 million km)	± 22 million km	0	0
36.8	0.15 AU (22 million km)	± 14 million km		
44.8	0.16 AU (24 million km)	± 8.6 million km		
53.5	0.14 AU (21 million km)	± 5.8 million km		

Closest approach to Earth in 2022 occurred on 13 March 2022 at a distance of about 7.7 million km. The perihelion (closest approach to the Sun) occurred on 25 April 2022.
