= (332446) 2008 AF4 =

Near-Earth asteroid

(332446) 2008 AF_{4}
Discovery
- Discovered by: LINEAR
- Discovery site: Lincoln Lab's ETS
- Discovery date: 10 January 2008

Designations
- Minor planet category: NEO · Apollo · PHA

Orbital characteristics
- Epoch 4 September 2017 (JD 2458000.5)
- Uncertainty parameter 0
- Observation arc: 13.78 yr (5,032 days)
- Aphelion: 1.9506 AU
- Perihelion: 0.8144 AU
- Semi-major axis: 1.3825 AU
- Eccentricity: 0.4109
- Orbital period (sidereal): 1.63 yr (594 days)
- Mean anomaly: 8.0690°
- Mean motion: 0° 36^{m} 22.68^{s} / day
- Inclination: 8.9193°
- Longitude of ascending node: 109.38°
- Argument of perihelion: 293.39°
- Earth MOID: 0.0025 AU · 1 LD

Physical characteristics
- Dimensions: 390 m
- Mass: 8.3×10^{10} kg
- Absolute magnitude (H): 19.7

(332446) 2008 AF_{4} is a sub-kilometer asteroid, classified as near-Earth object and potentially hazardous asteroid of the Apollo group, which was listed on the Sentry Risk Table in January 2008 with a Torino Scale rating of 1. The asteroid showed a 1 in 71,000 chance of impact on 9 January 2089. It was briefly downgraded to Torino Scale 0 in February 2008, but still showed a cumulative 1 in 53,000 chance of an impact. In March it was back at Torino Scale 1 with a 1 in 28,000 chance of impact on 9 January 2089. By mid April 2008, it was back to Torino Scale 0. It was removed from the Sentry Risk Table on 19 December 2009.

== 2183 passage ==
2008 AF_{4} may pass as close as 0.002 AU (300,000 km; 190,000 mi) from Earth on 12 January 2183. But the nominal solution shows the asteroid passing 0.009 AU (1,300,000 km; 840,000 mi) from Earth.
