= (529366) 2009 WM1 =

Sub-kilometer asteroid and near-Earth object

(529366) 2009 WM_{1}
Discovery
- Discovered by: CSS
- Discovery site: Catalina Stn.
- Discovery date: 17 November 2009

Designations
- Minor planet category: NEO; Apollo; PHA

Orbital characteristics
- Epoch 27 April 2019 (JD 2458600.5)
- Uncertainty parameter 0
- Observation arc: 8.99 yr (3,283 d)
- Aphelion: 1.3798 AU
- Perihelion: 0.9810 AU
- Semi-major axis: 1.1804 AU
- Eccentricity: 0.1689
- Orbital period (sidereal): 1.28 yr (468 d)
- Mean anomaly: 144.70°
- Mean motion: 0° 46^{m} 6.6^{s} / day
- Inclination: 25.768°
- Longitude of ascending node: 240.27°
- Argument of perihelion: 162.62°
- Earth MOID: 0.0001 AU (0.039 LD)

Physical characteristics
- Mean diameter: 280 m (est.)
- Mass: 2.9×10^{10} kg
- Absolute magnitude (H): 20.4

(529366) 2009 WM_{1} is a sub-kilometer asteroid and near-Earth object of the Apollo group, approximately 280 meters (920 feet) in diameter. After its discovery by the Catalina Sky Survey at the Catalina Station in Arizona, United States, this potentially hazardous asteroid was briefly listed at a Torino Scale of 1 and a cumulative Palermo Scale of −0.87. It was removed from the Sentry Risk Table on 26 June 2013.

== Numbering and naming ==
This minor planet was numbered by the Minor Planet Center on 18 May 2019 (M.P.C. 114667). As of 2019, it has not been named.

== Orbit and classification ==
2009 WM_{1} orbits the Sun at a distance of 0.98–1.38 AU once every 15 months (468 days; semi-major axis of 1.18 AU). Its orbit has an eccentricity of 0.17 and an inclination of 26° with respect to the ecliptic.

Even though 2009 WM_{1} has an Earth MOID of 0.00009 AU (13,000 km; 8,400 mi), the orbit and future close approaches are well determined with an orbital uncertainty of 1.

On 23 November 2059, 2009 WM_{1} will pass 0.0046 AU (690,000 km; 430,000 mi) from Earth. On 23 November 2199, it will make another close approach at a distance of 0.0005 AU (75,000 km; 46,000 mi) to 0.069 AU, but since it is a close approach and the exact distance in uncertain, future close approaches after 2199 are uncertain.

== 2014 passage ==
The 21 May 2014 Earth close approach of 0.3622 AU (54,180,000 km; 33,670,000 mi) should allow a refinement to the orbit. From 7 May 2014 until 2 June 2014 the asteroid will be brighter than apparent magnitude 20. The asteroid came to opposition on 18 May 2014 when it was up all night.
