= Gravitational focusing =

Effect of gravity

The concept of gravitational focusing describes how the gravitational attraction between two objects increases the probability that they will collide. Without gravitational force, the likelihood of a collision would depend on the cross-sectional area of the two objects. However, the presence of gravity can cause objects that would have otherwise missed each other to be drawn together, effectively increasing the size of their cross-sectional area.

Assuming two bodies having spherical symmetry, a collision will occur if the minimum separation between the two centres is less than the sum of the two radii. Because of the conservation of angular momentum, we have the following relationship between the relative speed when the separation equals this sum, $v_{\text{max}}$ and the relative speed when the objects are very far apart $v_{\text{rel}}$:

$$v_{\text{max}}(r_1+r_2)=v_{\text{rel}}\Delta$$

where $\Delta$ is the minimum separation that would occur if the two bodies were not attracted one to the other. This means that a collision will occur not only when $\Delta<r_1+r_2,$ but when

$$\Delta<(r_1+r_2)v_{\text{max}}/v_{\text{rel}}$$

and the cross-sectional area is increased by the square of the ratio, so the probability of collision is increased by a factor of $v_{\text{max}}^2/v_{\text{rel}}^2.$ However, by the conservation of energy we have

$$v_{\text{max}}^2=v_{\text{esc}}^2+v_{\text{rel}}^2$$

where $v_{\text{esc}}$ is the escape velocity. This gives the increase in probability of a collision as a factor of $1+v_{\text{esc}}^2/v_{\text{rel}}^2.$ When neither body can be treated as having a negligible mass, the escape velocity is given by:

$$v_{\text{esc}}^2=2G(M_1+M_2)/(r_1+r_2)$$

When the second body is of negligible size and mass, we have:

$$v_{\text{esc}}^2/v_{\text{rel}}^2=\frac 83\pi G\rho r_1^2/v_{\text{rel}}^2$$

where $\rho$ is the average density of the large body.

The equation of conservation of energy can be developed into

$$\Delta^2/r_{\text{min}}^2=2GM/(r_{\text{min}}v^2_{\text{rel}})+1$$

where $r_{\text{min}}$ is the minimum separation between the centres and $M$ is the total mass.

Instead of using this to find $\Delta$ for a given $r_{\text{min}},$ we can solve for $r_{\text{min}}/\Delta$ given $\Delta,\ M,$ and $v_{\text{rel}}:$

$$r_{\text{min}}/\Delta=\frac 1{GM/(v_{\text{rel}}^2\Delta)+\sqrt{(GM/(v_{\text{rel}}^2\Delta))^2+1}}$$

When $r_{\text{min}}$ is less than the combined radii of the bodies, there will be a collision.

The eccentricity of the hyperbolic trajectory is:

$$\epsilon=1+v_{\text{rel}}^2r_{\text{min}}/(GM) =1+\frac{v_{\text{rel}}^2\Delta}{GM}\frac 1{GM/(v_{\text{rel}}^2\Delta)+\sqrt{(GM/(v_{\text{rel}}^2\Delta))^2+1}}$$

When there is no collision, the trajectories turn by $2\operatorname{arccsc}\epsilon$ in the centre-of-mass fame of reference. The relative velocity vector changes by $2v_{\text{rel}}/\epsilon,$ the velocity of the lighter body changing more and of the more massive body less. The relative speed goes asymptotically back down toward $v_{\text{rel}}.$

== Function ==
Gravitational focusing applies to extended objects like the Moon, planets and the Sun, whose interior density distributions are well known. Gravitational focusing is responsible for the power-law mass function of star clusters. Gravitational focusing plays a significant role in the formation of planets, as it shortens the time required for them to form and promotes the growth of larger particles.

== Dark matter ==
Gravitational focusing typically only has a small impact on the relaxed halo dark matter component, with effects typically remaining at around the 5% level. However, the impact of gravitational focusing on dark matter substructures could potentially be much greater.
