= (481482) 2007 CA19 =

Sub-kilometer asteroid

(481482) 2007 CA_{19}
Discovery
- Discovered by: Catalina Sky Survey
- Discovery date: February 11, 2007

Designations
- Minor planet category: NEO; Apollo; PHA; Earth-crosser; Mars-crosser

Orbital characteristics
- Epoch January 13, 2016 (JD 2457400.5)
- Uncertainty parameter 0
- Observation arc: 3258 days (8.92 yr)
- Aphelion: 5.11769 AU (765.596 Gm)
- Perihelion: 0.502914 AU (75.2349 Gm)
- Semi-major axis: 2.81030 AU (420.415 Gm)
- Eccentricity: 0.821046
- Orbital period (sidereal): 4.71 yr (1720.8 d)
- Mean anomaly: 306.543°
- Mean motion: 0° 12^{m} 33.142^{s} /day
- Inclination: 9.58919°
- Longitude of ascending node: 170.154°
- Argument of perihelion: 102.390°
- Earth MOID: 0.0193363 AU (2.89267 Gm)

Physical characteristics
- Mean diameter: 0.864 km
- Mass: 8.9×10^{11} kg
- Mean density: 2.6 g/cm^{3}
- Absolute magnitude (H): 17.6

(481482) 2007 CA_{19} is a sub-kilometer asteroid, classified as a near-Earth object and potentially hazardous asteroid of the Apollo group. It briefly led the impact hazard list with a Torino Scale impact risk value of 1 for one week, ending on February 19, 2007. Before and after 2007 CA_{19}, 99942 Apophis was the object with the highest Palermo Scale rating. With an observation arc of 4.8 days, it had a Palermo Scale of −0.88.

2007 CA_{19} was discovered on February 11, 2007, by the Catalina Sky Survey at the University of University of Arizona. The object is estimated at 966 meters in diameter with a mass of a 1.2 trillion kg. Until February 15, it had an impact probability of 1/625,000 for the day March 14, 2012. Additional observations through February 19 decreased the impact probability to ~1 in 300 million, making it of negligible concern. It was removed from the Sentry Risk Table on February 22, 2007.

2007 CA_{19} passed about 0.007 AU (1,000,000 km; 650,000 mi) from Venus on July 6, 1946.

== See also ==
- List of exceptional asteroids
- Asteroid impact avoidance
- Asteroid naming conventions
