= 2025 FA22 =

Near-Earth, potentially hazardous asteroid

2025 FA_{22}
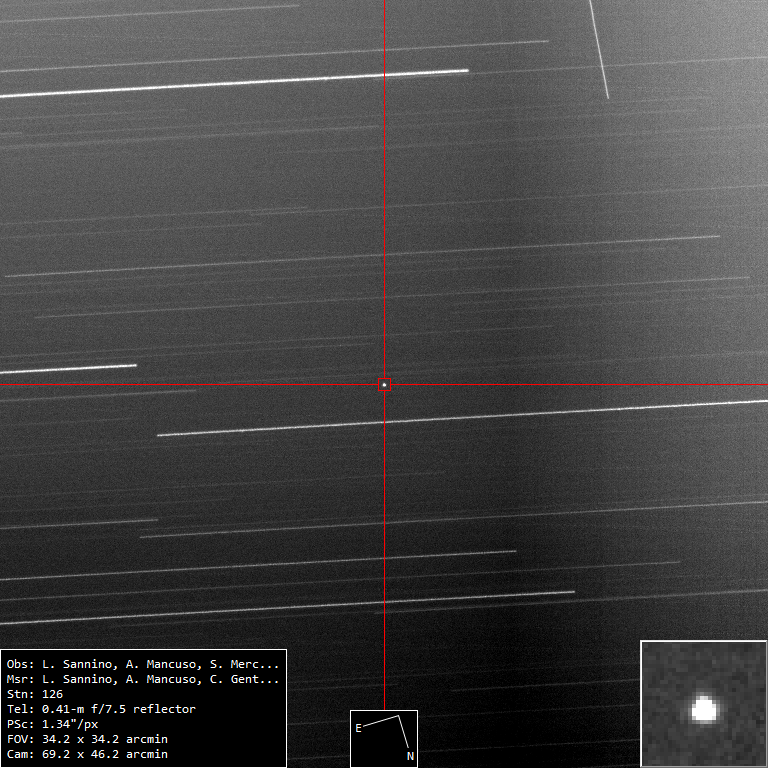
- Image taken on 17 September 2025

Discovery
- Discovery date: 29 March 2025

Orbital characteristics
- Epoch 2461000.5
- Aphelion: 2.110974058360922
- Perihelion: 0.8801595505556782 AU
- Semi-major axis: 1.4955668044583 AU
- Eccentricity: 0.4114876393806591
- Orbital period (sidereal): 668.0472066337281 y (1.829013570523554 d)
- Mean anomaly: 57.13083511131047
- Mean motion: 0.5388840734983839
- Inclination: 7.621367694820475
- Longitude of ascending node: 356.4686975356295
- Argument of perihelion: 304.3308192230652
- Group: Apollo asteroid
- Star: Sun

2025 FA_{22}, sometimes shortened to FA22, is a near-Earth (NEO), potentially hazardous asteroid (PHA). It is a member of the Apollo group orbiting at a distance of 1.49 AU with an orbital eccentricity of 0.41 and an inclination of 7.62°.

== Physical characteristics ==
The asteroid has an estimated diameter between 130 and 290 meters. Studies on the polarimetry and albedo of 2025 FA_{22} is consistent with it being a M-type asteroid.

== Close approach ==
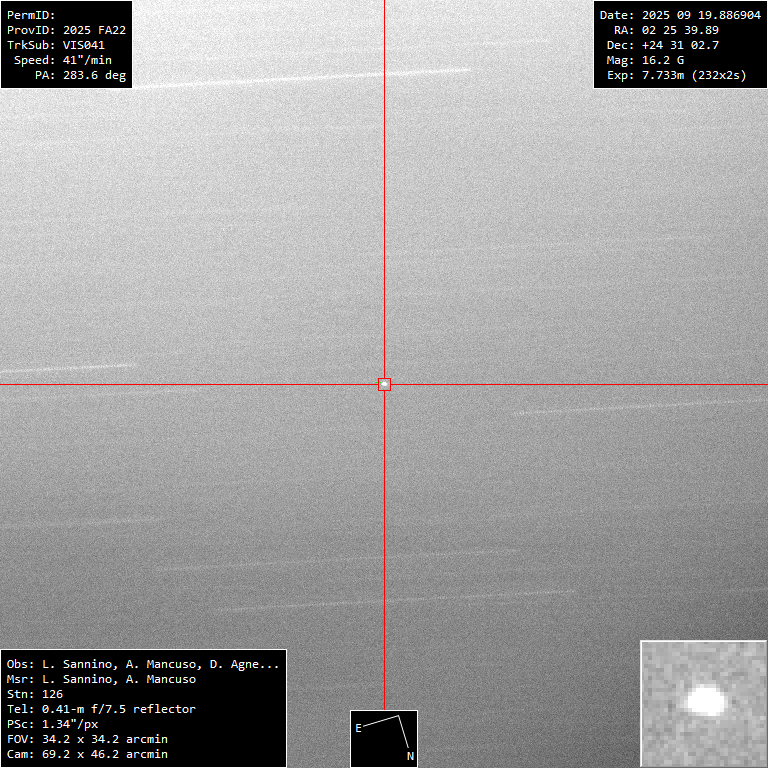
Image taken on 30 September 2025

The asteroid had a close approach with Earth on 18 September 2025 at a distance of two lunar distances. It was among the largest near-Earth objects at such proximity which prompted an International AsteroidWarning Network (IAWN) rapid-response campaign. Although early orbital solutions of 2025 FA_{22} predicted a possible impact in the year 2089, follow-up astrometric observations later ruled out the possibility.
