= (792156) 2020 XR =

Apollo near-Earth asteroid

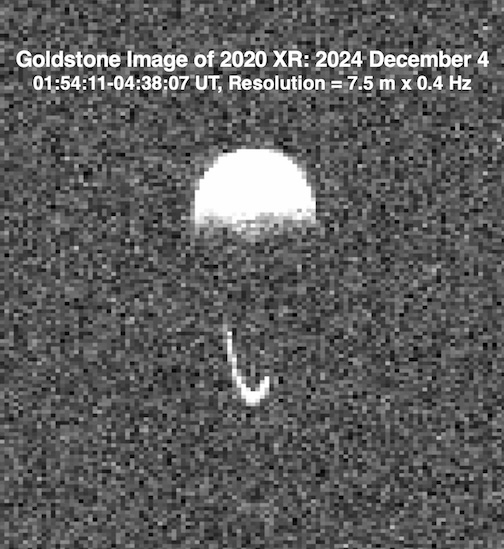
- Goldstone Observatory radar images of 2020 XR and its satellite

Discovery
- Discovered by: Pan-STARRS 2
- Discovery site: Haleakala Obs.
- Discovery date: 4 December 2020

Designations
- Minor planet category: NEO–Apollo; PHA

Orbital characteristics
- Epoch 2020-May-31 (JD 2459000.5)
- Uncertainty parameter 0
- Observation arc: 7.8 years
- Aphelion: 4.0272 AU (602,460,000 km) (Q)
- Perihelion: 0.97013 AU (145,129,000 km) (q)
- Semi-major axis: 2.4987 AU (373,800,000 km) (a)
- Eccentricity: 0.61174 (e)
- Orbital period (sidereal): 3.95 yr
- Mean anomaly: 312.19° (M)
- Inclination: 13.947° (i)
- Longitude of ascending node: 249.74° (Ω)
- Time of perihelion: 8 December 2020
- Argument of perihelion: 163.01° (ω)
- Known satellites: 1
- Earth MOID: 0.00085 AU (127,000 km; 0.33 LD)
- Jupiter MOID: 1.4 AU (210,000,000 km)

Physical characteristics
- Mean diameter: ~390 meters (1,000 feet)
- Absolute magnitude (H): 19.8

(792156) 2020 XR is a binary Apollo near-Earth object and potentially hazardous asteroid roughly 390 meters (1,000 feet) in diameter. With a 5-day observation arc it was briefly listed as having a 1 in 11,000 chance of impacting Earth on 1 December 2028, which placed it at the top of the Sentry Risk Table with a Palermo scale rating of −0.70.

== Discovery ==
2020 XR was discovered by Pan-STARRS 2 on 4 December 2020, when it was 0.426 AU (63.7 million km) from Earth and had a solar elongation of 75°. It came to perihelion on 8 December 2020. On 2 January 2021, it passed 0.328 AU (49.1 million km) from Earth.

On 13 December 2020, precovery observations from 2013, 2016, and mid-2020 extended the observation arc from 8 days to 7.8 years allowing the asteroid to be removed from the Sentry Risk Table. Permanent number was assigned on 31 March 2025.

== Satellite ==
A satellite was discovered on 2 December 2024 by Goldstone Observatory in California using radar observations.

== 2024 ==
It was the Earth's perturbations of the asteroid in 2024 that determined if an impact was possible in December 2028. On 4 December 2024, the asteroid passed 0.0147 AU (2.20 million km; 5.7 LD) from Earth with an uncertainty region of about ±800 km. This increased the asteroid's orbital period by 10 days.

Orbital period 3 months before and after 2024-Dec-04 Earth approach
Parameter	Epoch (date)	Orbital Period
Units		(days)
Pre-flyby	2024-Sep-04	1441
Post-flyby	2025-Mar-04	1451

== 2028 ==
On 7 November 2028, the asteroid will pass 0.121 AU (18.1 million km) from Earth. By 1 December 2028 the asteroid will be 0.19 AU (28 million km) from Earth with an uncertainty region of about ±10,000 km. (Note: While the observation arc was only a few days, the uncertainty region on 1 December 2028 was approximately a billion km.)
