= (89959) 2002 NT7 =

Asteroid

(89959) 2002 NT_{7}
Discovery
- Discovered by: LINEAR
- Discovery site: Lincoln Lab's ETS
- Discovery date: 9 July 2002

Designations
- Minor planet category: Apollo; NEO; PHA

Orbital characteristics
- Epoch 23 March 2018 (JD 2457800.5)
- Uncertainty parameter 0
- Observation arc: 62.68 yr (22,894 days)
- Aphelion: 2.6529 AU
- Perihelion: 0.8180 AU
- Semi-major axis: 1.7355 AU
- Eccentricity: 0.5286
- Orbital period (sidereal): 2.29 yr (835 days)
- Mean anomaly: 79.375°
- Mean motion: 0° 25^{m} 51.96^{s} / day
- Inclination: 42.333°
- Longitude of ascending node: 132.08°
- Argument of perihelion: 300.67°
- Earth MOID: 0.0004 AU (60,000 km; 37,000 mi)

Physical characteristics
- Mean diameter: 1.407±0.085 km
- Geometric albedo: 0.224±0.053
- Absolute magnitude (H): 16.4

(89959) 2002 NT_{7} is a near-Earth object with a diameter of 1.4 kilometers and potentially hazardous asteroid of the Apollo group. It has a well determined orbit with an observation arc of 64 years including precovery images by Palomar Observatory dating back to 1954.

2002 NT_{7} became the first object observed by NASA's NEO program to be assigned a positive rating on both the Torino scale and the Palermo scale for a small chance of an impact on 1 February 2019, however it passed Earth at roughly 0.4078 AU (61,010,000 km; 37,910,000 mi) on 13 January 2019 with an uncertainty region of around ±108 km.

== Discovery ==
It was discovered on 9 July 2002 by the Lincoln Near-Earth Asteroid Research team (LINEAR) at the U.S. Lincoln Laboratory Experimental Test Site near Socorro, New Mexico. At the time of discovery it only had a 6-day observation arc of 9–14 July, which poorly constrained possible future positions of the asteroid.

Despite inflammatory press reports, the object had a "low probability" of impact, approximately one in a million, for 1 February 2019. On 22 July 2002, NEODyS posted a positive 0.18 Palermo scale rating. Further observations, especially from Erich Meyer, quickly lowered the probability. . On 25 July 2002, the hazard rating on the Palermo scale was lowered to −0.25. However, the discovery of the object with an initial Palermo scale rating of 0.06 was a historical event for the NEO observation program.

2002 NT_{7} was removed from the Sentry Risk Table on 1 August 2002 (23 days after discovery), meaning there is no risk of an impact by it in the next 100 years. On 13 January 2019, the asteroid safely passed 0.4078 AU (61,010,000 km; 37,910,000 mi) from Earth with a 3-sigma uncertainty region of about ±108 km. Between 1900 and 2195 the closest approach to Earth will occur on 15 January 2099 at a distance of roughly 0.3739 AU (55,930,000 km; 34,760,000 mi) with an uncertainty region of about ±430 km.

On 30 January 2020, the asteroid safely passed 0.02718 AU (4,066,000 km; 2,527,000 mi) from 2 Pallas.
