= (144898) 2004 VD17 =

Sub-kilometre asteroid

(144898) 2004 VD_{17}
Discovery
- Discovered by: LINEAR
- Discovery date: 7 November 2004

Designations
- Minor planet category: NEO; Apollo; Earth-crosser; Venus-crosser; Mars-crosser

Orbital characteristics
- Epoch 2022-Jan-21 (JD 2459600.5)
- Uncertainty parameter 0
- Observation arc: 17.8 years
- Aphelion: 2.3958 AU (358.41 million km)
- Perihelion: 0.62008 AU (92.763 million km)
- Semi-major axis: 1.5079 AU (225.58 million km)
- Eccentricity: 0.58878
- Orbital period (sidereal): 1.85 yr (676.34 d)
- Mean anomaly: 133.93°
- Mean motion: 0° 31^{m} 56.428^{s} / day
- Inclination: 4.2239°
- Longitude of ascending node: 224°
- Argument of perihelion: 90.97°
- Earth MOID: 0.0015 AU (220,000 km)

Physical characteristics
- Mean diameter: 320 m 580 m (assumed); 0.5–1.0 km (CNEOS)
- Mass: (0.13–1.8)×10^{12} kg
- Synodic rotation period: 1.99 h (0.083 d)
- Spectral type: E
- Absolute magnitude (H): 18.8

(144898) 2004 VD_{17} is a sub-kilometer asteroid, classified as a near-Earth object of the Apollo group once thought to have a low probability of impacting Earth on 4 May 2102. It reached a Torino Scale rating of 2 and a Palermo scale rating of −0.25 (an impact hazard of about 56% of the background level). With an observation arc of 17 years it is known that closest Earth approach will occur two days earlier on 2 May 2102 at a distance of about 5.5 million km.

Close approaches
Date	JPL SBDB nominal geocentric distance	uncertainty region (3-sigma)
2032-05-01	3140133 km	± 127 km
2102-05-02	5568961 km	± 50 thousand km
2196-05-05	996859 km	± 354 thousand km

== History ==
2004 VD_{17} was discovered on 7 November 2004, by the NASA-funded LINEAR asteroid survey. The object is estimated by NASA's Near Earth Object Program Office to be 580 meters in diameter with an approximate mass of 2.6×10^{11} kg.

Being approximately 580 meters in diameter, if 2004 VD_{17} were to impact land, it would create an impact crater about 10 kilometres wide and generate an earthquake of magnitude 7.4.

=== Elevated risk estimate in 2006 ===
From February to May 2006, 2004 VD_{17} was listed with a Torino Scale impact risk value of 2, only the second asteroid in risk-monitoring history to be rated above value 1. With an observation arc of 1511 days, it was estimated to have a 1 in 1320 chance of impacting on 4 May 2102. The Torino rating was lowered to 1 after additional observations on 20 May 2006, and finally dropped to 0 on 17 October 2006.

=== 2008 observations ===
As of 4 January 2008, the Sentry Risk Table assigned 2004 VD_{17} a Torino value of 0 and an impact probability of 1 in 58.8 million for 4 May 2102. This value was far below the background impact rate of objects this size. Further observations allowed it to be removed from the Sentry Risk Table on 14 February 2008.

It will pass 0.021 AU (3,100,000 km; 2,000,000 mi) from Earth on 1 May 2032, allowing a refinement to the orbit.

== Properties ==
It has a spectral type of E. This suggests that the asteroid has a high albedo and is on the smaller size range for an object with an absolute magnitude of 18.8.

== See also ==
- 3103 Eger, possible parent of the Aubrite asteroids
- 99942 Apophis
- Asteroid impact avoidance
- Aubrite asteroid family
- E-type asteroid
- Hungaria family of asteroids
- List of exceptional asteroids
