= Torino scale =

Measure for hazard from asteroid or comet impacts on Earth

Graphical representation of the Torino scale. The sizes are approximate. Energy is in TNT equivalent.

The Torino scale is a method for categorizing the impact hazard associated with near-Earth objects (NEOs) such as asteroids and comets. It is intended as a communication tool for astronomers and the public to assess the seriousness of collision predictions, by combining probability statistics and known kinetic damage potentials into a single threat value. The Palermo scale is a similar, but more complex scale.

Near-Earth objects with a Torino scale of 1 are discovered several times a year, and may last a few weeks until they have a longer observation arc that eliminates any possibility of a collision. The only objects that have ever ranked higher on the Torino scale are three asteroids: 99942 Apophis, which had a rating of 4 for four days in late 2004, the highest recorded rating; (144898) 2004 VD17, with a historical rating of 2 from February to May 2006; and 2024 YR4, with a rating of 3 from January 27, 2025 to February 20, 2025.

== Overview ==
The Torino scale uses an integer scale from 0 to 10. A 0 indicates an object has a negligibly small chance of collision with the Earth, compared with the usual "background noise" of collision events, or is too small to penetrate Earth's atmosphere intact. A 10 indicates that a collision is certain, and the impacting object is large enough to precipitate a global disaster.

An object is assigned a 0 to 10 value based on its collision probability and the kinetic energy of the possible collision.

The Torino scale is defined only for potential impacts less than 100 years in the future.

"For an object with multiple potential collisions on a set of dates, a Torino scale value should be determined for each date. It may be convenient to summarize such an object by the greatest Torino scale value within the set."

== History and naming ==
The Torino scale was created by Professor Richard P. Binzel in the Department of Earth, Atmospheric, and Planetary Sciences, at the Massachusetts Institute of Technology (MIT). The first version, called "A Near-Earth Object Hazard Index", was presented at a United Nations conference in 1995 and was published by Binzel in the subsequent conference proceedings (Annals of the New York Academy of Sciences, volume 822, 1997.)

A revised version of the "Hazard Index" was presented at a June 1999 international conference on NEOs held in Torino (Turin), Italy. The conference participants voted to adopt the revised version, where the bestowed name "Torino scale" recognizes the spirit of international cooperation displayed at that conference toward research efforts to understand the hazards posed by NEOs. ("Torino scale" is the proper usage, not "Turin scale.") This version was published in a subsequent peer-reviewed article.

Due to exaggerated press coverage of Level 1 asteroids, a rewording of the Torino scale was published in 2005, adding more details and renaming the categories: in particular, Level 1 was changed from "Events meriting careful monitoring" to "Normal".

The Torino scale has served as the model for the Rio scale, which quantifies the validity and societal impact of SETI data.

== Definition ==
Ratings are assigned based on the parameters of impact calculations. Each rating has a defined meaning which is to inform the public.

=== Calculation of ratings ===
Ratings are determined on the basis of the impact probability (p), expressed as a real number between 0 for no chance of impact and 1 for a certain impact; and the estimated impact energy (E), expressed in megatons of TNT.

Rating	Condition						
0	(log_{10}E + 1)/3 + (log_{10}p + 2)/2 < 0	OR	log_{10}E < 0				
1	(log_{10}E + 1)/3 + (log_{10}p + 2)/2 ≥ 0	AND	log_{10}E ≥ 0	AND	(log_{10}E − 2)/3 + (log_{10}p + 2)/2 < 0	AND	log_{10}p < −2
2	(log_{10}E − 2)/3 + (log_{10}p + 2)/2 ≥ 0	AND	(log_{10}E − 5)/3 + (log_{10}p + 2)/2 < 0	AND	log_{10}p < −2		
3	log_{10}p ≥ −2	AND	log_{10}E ≥ 0	AND	log_{10}E < 2	AND	p < 0.99
4	log_{10}p ≥ −2	AND	log_{10}E ≥ 2	AND	(log_{10}E − 5)/3 + (log_{10}p + 2)/2 < 0	AND	p < 0.99
5	(log_{10}E − 5)/3 + (log_{10}p + 2)/2 ≥ 0	AND	p < 0.99 AND log_{10}E < 5				
6	(log_{10}E − 5)/3 + (log_{10}p + 2)/2 ≥ 0	AND	log_{10}p < −2				
7	log_{10}p ≥ −2	AND	+ log_{10}E ≥ 5	AND	p < 0.99		
8	p ≥ 0.99	AND	+ log_{10}E ≥ 0	AND	log_{10}E < 2		
9	p ≥ 0.99	AND	+ log_{10}E ≥ 2	AND	log_{10}E < 5		
10	p ≥ 0.99	AND	+ log_{10}E ≥ 5				

=== Meaning of ratings ===
The Torino scale also uses a color code scale: white, green, yellow, orange, red. Each color code has an overall meaning:

No hazard (white)
0	The likelihood of a collision is zero, or is so low as to be effectively zero. Also applies to small objects such as meteors and bodies that burn up in the atmosphere as well as infrequent meteorite falls that rarely cause damage.
Normal (green)
1	A routine discovery in which a pass near Earth is predicted that poses no unusual level of danger. Current calculations show a collision is extremely unlikely with no cause for public attention or public concern. New telescopic observations very likely will lead to reassignment to Level 0.
Meriting attention by astronomers (yellow)
2	A discovery, which may become routine with expanded searches, of an object making a somewhat close but not highly unusual pass near Earth. While meriting attention by astronomers, there is no cause for public attention or public concern as an actual collision is still very unlikely. New telescopic observations very likely will lead to reassignment to Level 0.
3	A close encounter, meriting attention by astronomers. Current calculations give a 1% or greater chance of collision capable of localized destruction. Most likely, new telescopic observations will lead to reassignment to Level 0. Attention by public and by public officials is merited if the encounter is less than 10 years away.
4	A close encounter, meriting attention by astronomers. Current calculations give a 1% or greater chance of collision capable of regional devastation. Most likely, new telescopic observations will lead to reassignment to Level 0. Attention by public and by public officials is merited if the encounter is less than 10 years away.
Threatening (orange)
5	A close encounter posing a serious, but still uncertain threat of regional devastation. Even though most objects of this level will be lowered to Level 0, critical attention by astronomers is still needed to determine conclusively whether a collision will occur. If the encounter is less than 10 years away, governmental contingency planning may be warranted.
6	A close encounter by a large object posing a serious but still uncertain threat of a global catastrophe. Critical attention by astronomers is needed to determine conclusively whether a collision will occur. If the encounter is less than 30 years away, governmental contingency planning may be warranted. Some objects of this level may be lowered to Level 1 or 2, if the chances of collision decrease.
7	A very close encounter by a large object which, if occurring over the next 100 years, poses an unprecedented but still uncertain threat (1% or greater chance) of a global catastrophe. For such a threat, international contingency planning is warranted, especially to determine urgently and conclusively whether a collision will occur.
Certain collisions (red)
8	A collision is certain, capable of causing localized destruction for an impact over land or possibly a tsunami if close offshore. Such events occur on average between once a century and once per 10,000 years.
9	A collision is certain, capable of causing unprecedented regional devastation for a land impact or the threat of a major tsunami for an ocean impact. Such events occur on average between once per 10,000 years and once per few hundred thousand years.
10	A collision is certain, capable of causing global catastrophes that may threaten the future of civilization and life as we know it. Oceanic impacts can cause tsunamis hundreds, or even thousands, of feet high while land impacts can cause major firestorms. Such events occur on average once every few hundred thousand years. Larger objects of this size may strike less often.

No incoming object has ever been rated above level 4, though over Earth's history impacts have spanned the full range of damage described by the scale.

== Risk calculation ==
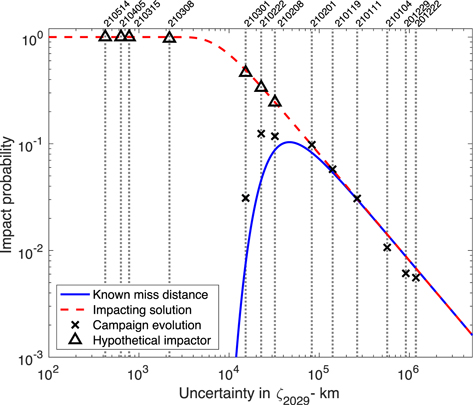
Top: example of the shrinking and changing position of the 3-sigma uncertainty region relative to Earth in the B-plane
Bottom: theoretical (blue and dashed red) and observational (crosses and triangles) evolution of impact probability as a function of uncertainty in the close approach distance for a bypass and an impact case, based on a planetary defense exercise using adapted real observations of 99942 Apophis

For NASA, a unit of the Jet Propulsion Laboratory (JPL), the Center for Near-Earth Object Studies (CNEOS) calculates impact risks and assigns ratings in its Sentry Risk Table, while another unit of JPL, Solar System Dynamics (SSD) provides orbital and close approach data. For ESA, similar services are provided by its Near-Earth Object Coordination Centre (NEOCC), which maintains its own Risk List and Close Approaches List.

The basis for the risk evaluation is the most recent orbit calculation based on all known reliable observations. Along the calculated orbit, close approaches with Earth are determined. Due to measurement and model imprecision, the orbit calculation has an uncertainty, which can be quantified for the close approach distance. Assuming a two-dimensional Gaussian probability distribution in the plane perpendicular to the asteroid's orbit (the B-plane), the uncertainty can be characterized by the standard deviation (sigma) the close approach point in the directions along the asteroid's orbit and perpendicular to it, where the former is usually much larger. The one-sigma margin, which is used by ESA NEOCC one-sigma, means that the close approach point is within those bounds with a 68.3% probability, while the 3-sigma margin, used by NASA JPL SSD, corresponds to 99.7% probability. The probability of an impact is the integral of the probability distribution over the cross section of Earth in the B-plane.

When the close approach of a newly discovered asteroid is first put on a risk list with a significant risk, it is normal for the risk to first increase, regardless whether the potential impact will eventually be ruled out or confirmed with the help of additional observations. After discovery, Earth will be close to the center of the probability distribution, that is, the 3-sigma uncertainty margin will be much bigger than the nominal close encounter distance. With additional observations, the uncertainty will decrease, thus the 3-sigma uncertainty region will shrink, thus Earth will initially cover an increasing part of the probability distribution, resulting in increased risk, and potentially an increasing rating. If the real orbit bypasses Earth, with further observations, Earth will only intersect the tail of the probability distribution (the 3-sigma region will shrink to exclude the Earth) and the impact risk will fall towards zero; while in case the asteroid will hit the Earth, the probability distribution will contract towards its intersection (the 3-sigma region will shrink into Earth's intersection in the B-plane) and the risk will rise towards 100%.

== Actual impacts and impact energy comparisons ==
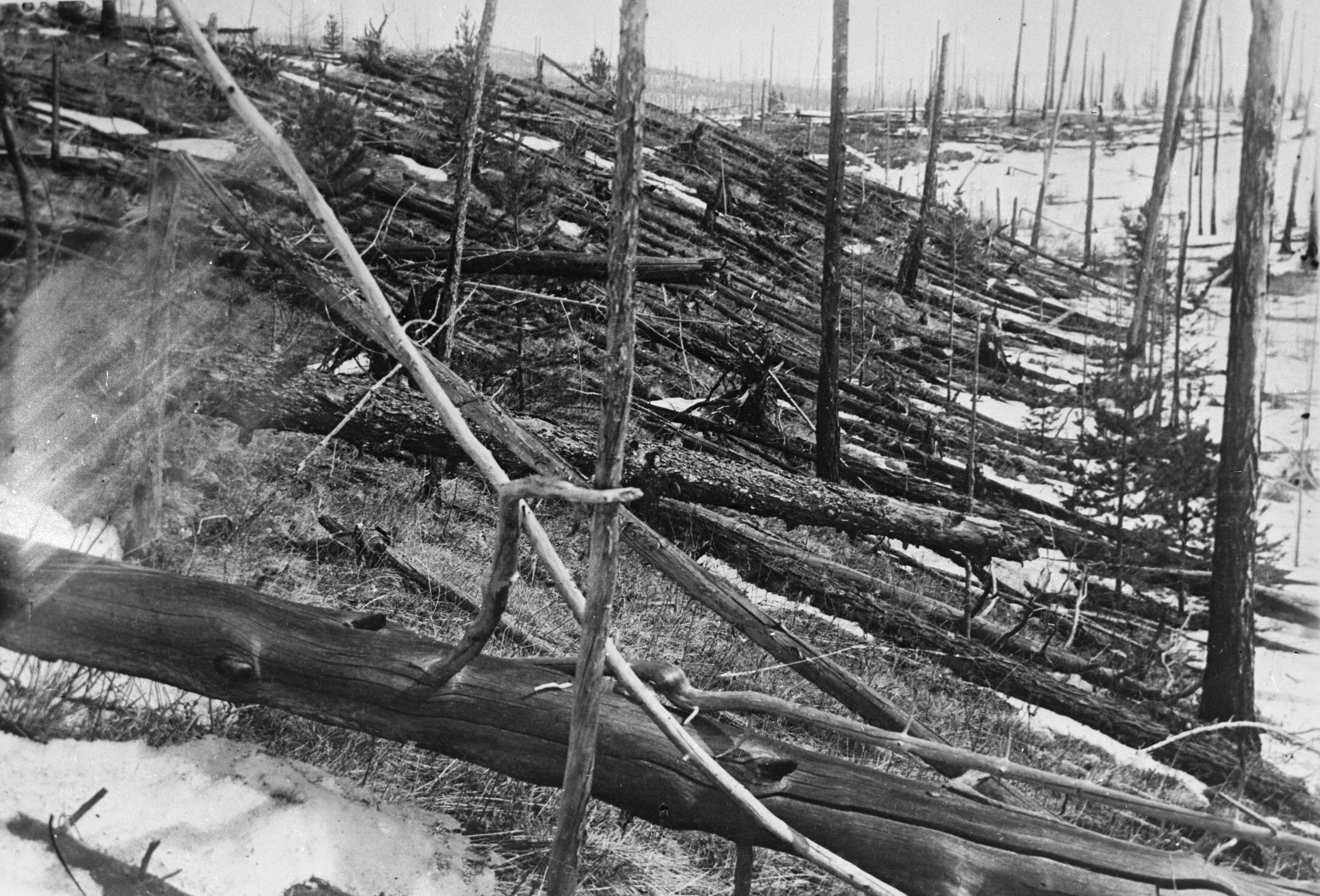
Burned and flattened trees after the Tunguska event in 1908.

The Chicxulub impact, believed by most scientists to have been a significant factor in the extinction of the non-avian dinosaurs, has been estimated at 100 million (10^{8}) megatons. Were an equivalent impact predicted with a probability of 99% or more, it would rate 10 on the Torino scale. The impacts that created the Barringer Crater and the 1908 Tunguska event are both estimated to have been in the 3–10 megaton range, thus, if a similar impact had been predicted with near certainty, it would correspond to Torino scale 8. The 2013 Chelyabinsk meteor had a total kinetic energy prior to impact of about 0.5 megatons, thus, regardless of impact probability, it would only rate 0 on the Torino scale – despite breaking over 3600 windows and injuring around 1500 people. Between 2000 and 2013, 26 atmospheric asteroid impacts with an energy of 1–600 kilotons were detected by the network of infrasound sensors operated by the Preparatory Commission for the Comprehensive Nuclear-Test-Ban Treaty Organization.

The biggest hydrogen bomb ever exploded, the Tsar Bomba, was around 50 megatons. The 1883 eruption of Krakatoa was the equivalent of roughly 200 megatons.

The comet C/2013 A1, which passed close to Mars in 2014, was originally estimated to have a potential impact energy of 5 million to 24 billion megatons, and in March 2013 was estimated to have a Mars impact probability of ~1:1250, corresponding to the Martian equivalent of Torino scale 6. The impact probability was reduced to ~1:120000 in April 2013, corresponding to Torino scale 1 or 2.

== See also ==
- Asteroid impact avoidance
- Impact event
