= 2009 JF1 =

Near-Earth asteroid

2009 JF_{1}
Discovery
- Discovered by: Mount Lemmon Survey
- Discovery date: 4 May 2009

Designations
- Minor planet category: NEO; Apollo

Orbital characteristics
- Epoch 2025-Nov-21 (JD 2461000.5)
- Uncertainty parameter 7
- Observation arc: 1.2 days
- Aphelion: 3.29 AU (Q)
- Perihelion: 0.4957 AU (q)
- Semi-major axis: 1.89 AU (a)
- Eccentricity: 0.738 (e)
- Orbital period (sidereal): 2.6 years
- Mean anomaly: 108°±1° (M)
- Inclination: 6.15° (i)
- Longitude of ascending node: 45.5° (Ω)
- Time of perihelion: 2025-Feb-08 ± 3 days
- Argument of perihelion: 281° (ω)
- Earth MOID: 0.000054 AU (8,100 km)
- Jupiter MOID: 2.1 AU (310,000,000 km)

Physical characteristics
- Dimensions: ~10 m (33 ft); 8–17 meters
- Absolute magnitude (H): 27.73

2009 JF_{1} is a small near-Earth object that should have passed within 0.3 AU (45 million km) of Earth in 2022. On 5 February 2022 the 2009 observations were remeasured greatly reducing the odds of an impact. On 6 May 2022 it had a 1-in-140,000 chance of impacting Earth. It is estimated to be 10-meters in diameter which would make it smaller than the Chelyabinsk meteor. It has a very short observation arc of 1.2 days and has not been observed since 2009. On 6 May 2022 it was nominally expected to be 0.2 AU (30 million km) from Earth but has an uncertainty region of ±23 million km (0.15 AU). The nominal Earth approach was 15 May 2022 and would have had the asteroid only brightening to apparent magnitude 26 which would have made it too faint for automated surveys to detect. With a Palermo scale rating of -4.41, the odds of impact were 26000 times less than the background hazard level for an asteroid of this size.

Virtual impactor
Date	Impact probability (1 in)	JPL Horizons nominal geocentric distance (AU)	NEODyS nominal geocentric distance (AU)	MPC nominal geocentric distance (AU)	Find_Orb nominal geocentric distance (AU)	uncertainty region (3-sigma)
2022-05-06	140000	0.19 AU (28 million km)	0.16 AU (24 million km)	0.19 AU (28 million km)	0.19 AU (28 million km)	± 23 million km

About two months after approaching Earth, it came to perihelion (closest approach to the Sun), but the time of perihelion passage is only known with an accuracy of ±3 days. The asteroid was not recovered due to its small size and distance from Earth.

== See also ==
- 2006 QV89
- 2018 VP1
