= 2018 XB4 =

Apollo near-Earth asteroid

2018 XB_{4}
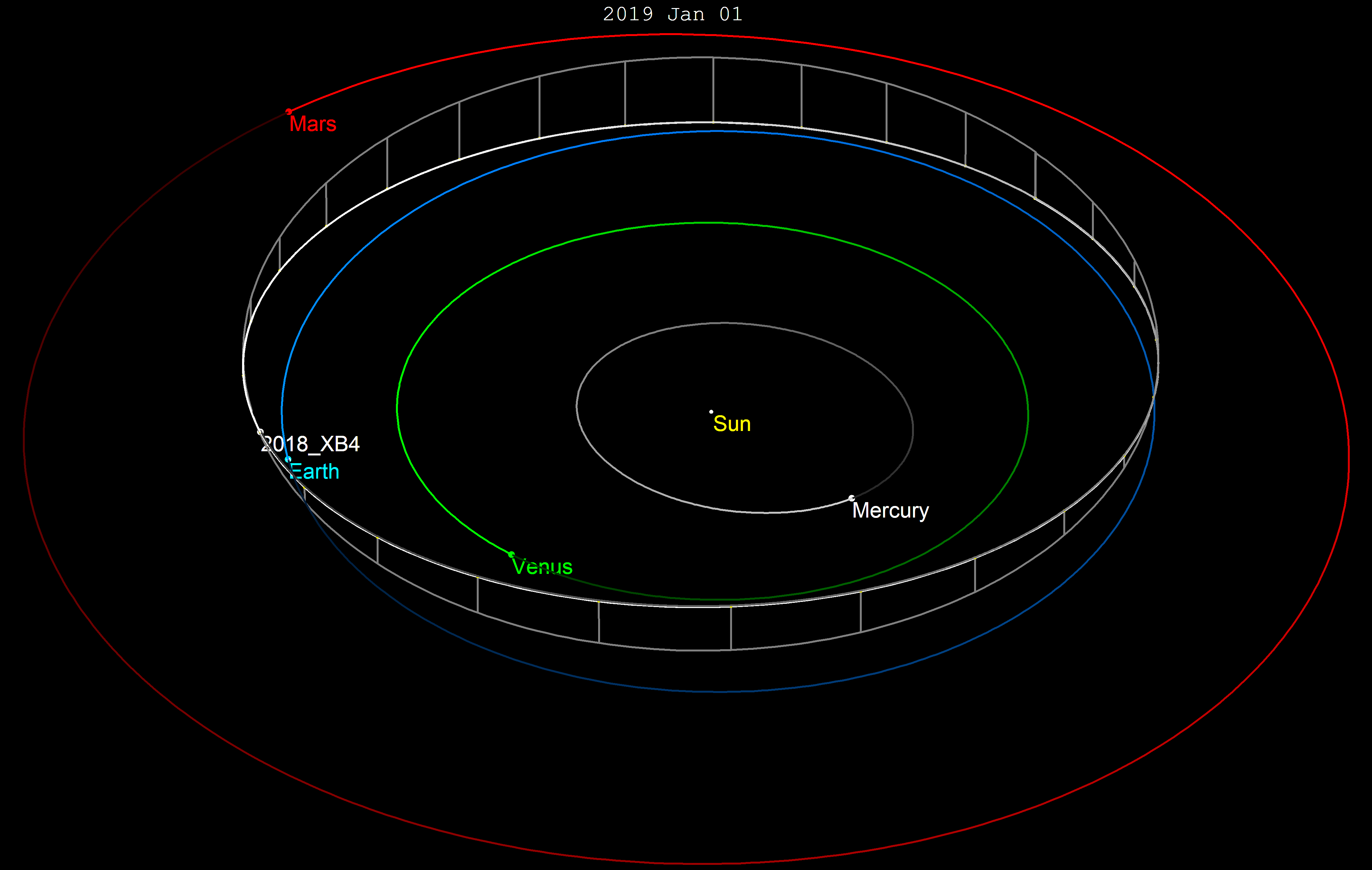
- Orbit of 2018 XB4 with 15-day motion shown

Discovery
- Discovered by: Pan-STARRS
- Discovery site: Haleakala Obs.
- Discovery date: 13 December 2018 (first observed only)

Designations
- Minor planet category: Apollo · NEO

Orbital characteristics
- Epoch 27 April 2019 (JD 2458600.5)
- Uncertainty parameter 5 · 6
- Observation arc: 42 days
- Aphelion: 1.2848 AU
- Perihelion: 0.8577 AU
- Semi-major axis: 1.0712 AU
- Eccentricity: 0.1993
- Orbital period (sidereal): 1.11 yr (405 d)
- Mean anomaly: 35.965°
- Mean motion: 0° 53^{m} 20.4^{s} / day
- Inclination: 8.7263°
- Longitude of ascending node: 92.063°
- Argument of perihelion: 92.282°
- Earth MOID: 0.0023 AU (0.9 LD)
- Jupiter MOID: 3.68 AU

Physical characteristics
- Mean diameter: 53 m
- Absolute magnitude (H): 24.0

2018 XB_{4} is an Apollo near-Earth asteroid roughly 53 meters (170 feet) in diameter. It was discovered on 13 December 2018 when the asteroid was about 0.125 AU (18,700,000 km; 11,600,000 mi) from Earth and had a solar elongation of 146°. It passed closest approach to Earth on 1 January 2019. Of the asteroids discovered in 2018, it had the highest Palermo scale rating at –3.6. In mid-2019 it was recovered which extended the observation arc to 177 days and was removed from the Sentry Risk Table on 12 June 2019. It is now known that on 22 June 2092 the asteroid will pass about 0.033±0.015 AU from Earth.

With a 42-day observation arc, the Sentry Risk Table showed an estimated 1 in 6200 chance of the asteroid impacting Earth on 22 June 2092. The nominal JPL Horizons 22 June 2092 Earth distance was 0.17 AU (25,000,000 km; 16,000,000 mi) with a 3-sigma uncertainty of ±320 million kilometers. A Monte Carlo simulation using Solex 12 with 1000 clones of the asteroid showed that by 2092 the uncertainty region for 2018 XB_{4} stretched around the entire orbit. NEODyS listed the nominal 22 June 2092 Earth distance as 0.009 AU (1,300,000 km; 840,000 mi).
