= 2018 VP1 =

Apollo near-Earth asteroid

2018 VP_{1}
Discovery
- Discovered by: Zwicky Transient Facility
- Discovery site: Palomar Mountain (I43)
- Discovery date: 3 November 2018

Designations
- Minor planet category: Apollo; NEO; risk listed

Orbital characteristics
- Epoch 2020-May-31 (JD 2459000.5)
- Uncertainty parameter 7
- Observation arc: 12.9 days
- Aphelion: 2.2703 AU (339,630,000 km) (Q)
- Perihelion: 0.90513 AU (135,406,000 km) (q)
- Semi-major axis: 1.5877 AU (237,520,000 km) (a)
- Eccentricity: 0.42992 (e)
- Orbital period (sidereal): 2.00 yr
- Mean anomaly: 300.72° (M)
- Inclination: 3.2419° (i)
- Longitude of ascending node: 39.816° (Ω)
- Argument of perihelion: 315.12° (ω)
- Earth MOID: 8300 km
- Jupiter MOID: 3.1 AU (460,000,000 km)

Physical characteristics
- Dimensions: ~2 meters (7 feet); 2–4 meters (CNEOS)
- Absolute magnitude (H): 30.9

2018 VP_{1} is an Apollo near-Earth asteroid roughly 2 meters (7 feet) in diameter. The asteroid had a 0.41% chance (1 in 240) of impacting Earth on 2 November 2020 01:12 UT. It was discovered on 3 November 2018 when it was about 0.003 AU (450,000 km; 280,000 mi) from Earth and had a solar elongation of 165 degrees. The asteroid has a short 12.9 day observation arc. It was last observed on 16 November 2018 by the European Southern Observatory Very Large Telescope at apparent magnitude 26 pushing the telescope close to the limiting magnitude.

The JPL Horizons 2 November 2020 nominal Earth approach was estimated as roughly 0.0028 AU (420,000 km; 260,000 mi). The line of variations (LOV, uncertainty region) allowed the asteroid to impact Earth (Note: The JPL Small-Body Database for 2020-Nov-02 shows a minimum possible distance of 0.000039 AU (5,800 km) from the center of Earth, which is less than the 6371 km radius of Earth.) or pass as far away as 0.025 AU (3,700,000 km; 2,300,000 mi). Its diameter of 2–4 meters makes it approximately 100–1000 times less massive than the 20-meter Chelyabinsk meteor. (Note: Assuming the same density and given that the volume of a sphere $= \frac{\pi}{6}\ d^3$, 2018 VP1 would have a volume of 4–33 m^{3} and the Chelyabinsk meteor was ~4200 m^{3}.) An Earth-impact by this asteroid, assuming it is a common primitive chondrite, might rattle some windows after an airburst and/or drop pebble-sized meteorites on roof tops after dark flight.

Preliminarily results are that nothing was detected via infrasound or atmospheric flash monitors. The asteroid was not visually recovered.

== Return ==
2018 VP_{1} has a low 3.2° orbital inclination with respect to the ecliptic plane and an Earth-MOID of only 9700 km. Since the asteroid approached Earth in November 2018 and has a 2.00 year orbital period, the asteroid approached Earth again around 2 November 2020 (±3 days). (Note: The JPL Small-Body Database for 2020-Nov-02 shows the "Time Uncertainty" as 3_07:11 which is 3 days, 7 hours, and 11 minutes.) Where Earth will be on a given date is known. However, given the short observation arc and the two years since it was seen at all, the location of the asteroid along its orbit was imprecisely known.

The asteroid intersected Earth's orbit. A slight variation in the known orbit of the asteroid can cause it to be early (NEODyS solution), right on time (Sentry solution), or late (JPL solution). (Note: Earth traveling at 30 km/s and with a diameter of 12,800 km, only blocked the path of single virtual impactor for about 8 minutes (30*60*8). Due to a non-Earth like orbit, the virtual asteroids can only impact Earth for about ±10 minutes centered around the virtual impactor at 2 November 2020 01:12 UT. If 2018 VP1 was not crossing Earth's orbit during that time there could be no impact.) The nominal NEODyS 1 November 2020 23:54 UT Earth approach is 0.0004 AU (60,000 km; 37,000 mi). The Sentry Risk Table showed an estimated 1 in 240 chance of Earth impact on 2 November 2020 1:12 UT. The nominal JPL Horizons 2 November 2020 11:33 UT Earth approach was 0.0028 AU (420,000 km; 260,000 mi) with a 3-sigma uncertainty of ± 4 million km.

Line of variation (LOV) and different closest approaches
Date and time	Closest Earth approach	Reference
1 November 2020 23:54	0.0004 AU (60,000 km)	NEODyS
2 November 2020 01:12	Impact scenario	Sentry
2 November 2020 11:33	0.0028 AU (420,000 km)	JPL SBDB

Animation of 2018 VP1's orbit

Around the Sun – close approach in 2018 and 2020

Around the Earth – close approach in 2018

Around the Earth – assumed close approach in 2020, but numerous other solutions fit

Sun · Earth · 2018 VP1 · Moon

=== Impact line ===
The line of variation (LOV) passed across the Pacific Ocean.

The asteroid came to opposition (opposite the Sun in the sky) at the end of May 2020 at an estimated apparent magnitude of ~31, and as a moving object was much too faint for any telescope to detect. Large ground-based observatories take 10 hours to image a magnitude ~28 object. The Hubble Space Telescope needs 3 weeks of exposure time to image magnitude 31 objects. The November 2020 Earth approach was expected be hidden by the glare of the Sun due to the asteroid's low solar elongation in that time.

Since the asteroid is only about 2 meters (7 feet) in diameter it is too small to do more than create a bolide and common strewn field similar to the Sutter's Mill meteorite or 2014 AA.

It is not categorized as a potentially hazardous object given the estimated size is smaller than the threshold for potentially hazardous objects which are estimated at more than 140 meters in diameter.

== See also ==
- 2020 AP1
- 2006 QV89
- 2020 VV
