= 2014 MV67 =

Mars-crossing asteroid

2014 MV_{67}
Discovery
- Discovered by: Pan-STARRS
- Discovery site: Haleakalā Obs.
- Discovery date: 24 June 2014

Designations
- Alternative designations: P10ciev
- Minor planet category: Mars-crosser

Orbital characteristics
- Epoch 2021-Jul-01 (JD 2459396.5)
- Uncertainty parameter 5 · 3 (Note: The Minor Planet Center's uncertainty code (orbit note) "E" stands for "Eccentricity assumed", as per Publishable Notes for Orbits of Minor Planets)
- Observation arc: 7.24 years
- Aphelion: 2.84 AU
- Perihelion: 1.58 AU
- Semi-major axis: 2.21 AU
- Eccentricity: 0.2839
- Orbital period (sidereal): 3.28 yr (1201 d)
- Mean anomaly: 351°
- Mean motion: 0° 22^{m} 53.76^{s}
- Inclination: 3.845°
- Longitude of ascending node: 146°
- Argument of perihelion: 207°
- Earth MOID: 0.58 AU (87 million km)
- Jupiter MOID: 2.6 AU
- T_{Jupiter}: 3.60

Physical characteristics
- Mean diameter: ~540 m
- Mass: 2.2×10^{11} kg
- Absolute magnitude (H): 19.58

2014 MV_{67} is a Mars-crosser and former lost asteroid with an observation arc of less than 1 day. Before its recovery, it had an assumed orbital eccentricity and a very poorly constrained orbit. Depending on the orbit, it could have been a potentially hazardous asteroid, roughly 540 meters (1,770 feet) in diameter, or it could turn out to be a Mars-crosser or even a main-belt asteroid as were the cases with 2004 BX159 and 2010 GZ60. (Note: With such short arcs uncertainties can not really be described with formal error bars. In this case non-NEO orbits are definitely possible, perhaps even more likely than NEO ones.) It was recovered by Pan-STARRS in September 2021 and is now known to be a Mars-crossing asteroid.

== Description ==
Main belt asteroids can have perihelia (closest approach to the Sun) as low as 1.7 AU. The 22 March 2022 impact scenario was 87,000 times lower than the background threat generated by unknown asteroids. (Note: Palermo Scale for 2022 is −4.94 and 10^4.94 = 87096.) It was removed from the Sentry Risk Table on 15 April 2021 when JPL transitioned to planetary ephemeris DE441.

It was discovered on 24 June 2014, when the asteroid was estimated to be 1.1 ± 0.84 AU (165 ± 126 million km) from Earth and had a solar elongation of 161 degrees.

The 22 March 2018 and 3 April 2019 virtual impactors did not occur. The uncertainty region of ±10 billion km wraps around the entire orbit so the asteroid could be anywhere on any of the numerous orbit fits. It could be near aphelion (in the asteroid belt) ~3 AU from the Sun. (Note: Jupiter is 5 AU (750 million km) from the Sun. The asteroid's aphelion range (furthest distance from the Sun) is estimated to be 2.1±0.5 AU.) The asteroid was not expected to be near Earth anytime during 2019.

With an almost meaningless 1-day observation arc, the Sentry Risk Table showed an estimated 1 in 3 billion chance of the asteroid impacting Earth on 22 March 2022, which was 87,000 times lower than the background threat. The nominal JPL Horizons 22 March 2022 Earth distance is 2.2 AU (330,000,000 km; 200,000,000 mi) with a 3-sigma uncertainty of ±3 billion km. NEODyS also lists the nominal 22 March 2022 Earth distance as 2.2 AU (330,000,000 km; 200,000,000 mi). And again it is not expected to be near Earth anytime during 2022.

Virtual impactors (past and future)
Date	Impact probability (1 in)	JPL Horizons nominal geocentric distance (AU)	NEODyS nominal geocentric distance (AU)	MPC nominal geocentric distance (AU)	Find_Orb nominal geocentric distance (AU)	uncertainty region (3-sigma)
2018-03-22	1.9 billion	2.4 AU (360 million km)	2.5 AU (370 million km)	3.8 AU (570 million km)	2.3 AU (340 million km)	±600 million km
2019-04-03	2.1 billion	1.2 AU (180 million km)	1.2 AU (180 million km)	3.5 AU (520 million km)	2.6 AU (390 million km)	±600 million km
2022-03-22	removed	2.2 AU (330 million km)	2.2 AU (330 million km)	3.5 AU (520 million km) (Note: Jupiter is 4 AU from Earth every 13 months when Jupiter comes to opposition (opposite the Sun in the sky with Earth between the two).)	2.5 AU (370 million km)	±3 billion km
2025-03-26	removed	2.8 AU (420 million km)	2.8 AU (420 million km)	3.4 AU (510 million km)	2.4 AU (360 million km)	±2 billion km

== See also ==
- 2005 ED224
- 2007 FT3
