= 2007 FT3 =

Lost risk–listed hazardous near-Earth asteroid

2007 FT_{3}
Discovery
- Discovered by: Mt. Lemmon Survey
- Discovery date: 20 March 2007

Designations
- Minor planet category: Lost; NEO; Apollo; PHA; risk listed

Orbital characteristics
- Epoch 21 March 2007 (JD 2454180.5)
- Uncertainty parameter 9
- Observation arc: 1.2 days
- Aphelion: 1.48±0.02 AU (Q)
- Perihelion: 0.782±0.007 AU (q)
- Semi-major axis: 1.13±0.02 AU (a)
- Eccentricity: 0.308±0.006 (e)
- Orbital period (sidereal): 1.2±0.03 years
- Average orbital speed: 28.4 km/s (Note: v = 42.1219 √1/r − 0.5/a, where r is the distance from the Sun, and a is the major semi-axis. Average velocity is at r=a=1.1 AU.)
- Mean anomaly: 298°±3° (M)
- Inclination: 26.9°±0.43° (i)
- Longitude of ascending node: 9.9°±0.2° (Ω)
- Argument of perihelion: 277°±2° (ω)
- Earth MOID: 0.01 AU (1.5 million km) ?
- Jupiter MOID: 3.83 AU (573 million km) ?

Physical characteristics
- Dimensions: ~340 m (1,100 ft)?; 270–590 meters
- Absolute magnitude (H): 20?

2007 FT_{3} is a lost asteroid with a short observation arc of 1.2 days that cannot be recovered with targeted observations and awaits serendipitous survey observations. It has a poorly constrained orbit and has not been seen since 2007. It was first observed on 20 March 2007 when the asteroid was estimated to be 0.19 ± 0.01 astronomical units (28.4 ± 1.5 million kilometres) from Earth and had a solar elongation of 107 degrees. 2007 FT_{3} is the fourth largest asteroid with better than a 1-in-2 million cumulative chance of impacting Earth after (29075) 1950 DA, 1979 XB, and 101955 Bennu. With a cumulative Palermo Technical Impact Hazard Scale of –3.06, the poorly known orbit and assumed size place 2007 FT_{3} eighth on an unconstrained listing of the Sentry Risk Table.

== Potential impacts ==
Possible impacts were projected for 2 October 2013, 3 October 2019, and 3 October 2024. Since the asteroid has a short observation arc and the uncertainty in the orbit of the asteroid intersects Earth's orbit, simulations could not rule out the asteroid and Earth being at the same point in space on any of those dates. None of these impacts happened, nor was the asteroid detected near those dates.

Potential impacts (past and future)
Date	Impact probability (1 in)	JPL Horizons nominal geocentric distance (AU)	NEODyS nominal geocentric distance (AU)	MPC nominal geocentric distance (AU)	Find_Orb nominal geocentric distance (AU)	uncertainty region
2013-10-02	1.9 billion	0.94 AU (141 million km)	1.0 AU (150 million km)	1.1 AU (160 million km)	1.2 AU (180 million km)	± 330 million km
2019-10-03	11 million	0.93 AU (139 million km)	0.95 AU (142 million km)	1.3 AU (190 million km)	1.4 AU (210 million km)	± 620 million km
2024-10-03	11 million	1.7 AU (250 million km)	1.7 AU (250 million km)	2.0 AU (300 million km)	2.0 AU (300 million km)	± 500 million km

== See also ==
- 1979 XB
- 2014 MV67
