= 2000 SG344 =

Small risk–listed near-Earth asteroid

2000 SG_{344}
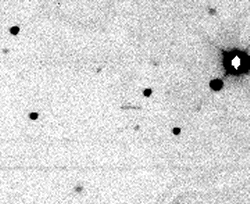
- 2000 SG_{344} seen on 29 September 2000, as a dim streak in the center of the image, moving against the background field of stars

Discovery
- Discovered by: D. J. Tholen; R. J. Whiteley
- Discovery site: Mauna Kea Obs.—UH88
- Discovery date: 29 September 2000 (first observation only)

Designations
- Minor planet category: NEO · Aten

Orbital characteristics
- Epoch 2025-Nov-21 (JD 2461000.5)
- Uncertainty parameter 3
- Observation arc: 507 days (1.39 yr)
- Aphelion: 1.0428 AU (156.00 Gm)
- Perihelion: 0.91203 AU (136.438 Gm)
- Semi-major axis: 0.97740 AU (146.217 Gm)
- Eccentricity: 0.06688
- Orbital period (sidereal): 0.97 yr (352.94 d)
- Mean anomaly: 275.66°
- Mean motion: 1.0200°/day
- Inclination: 0.113110°
- Longitude of ascending node: 191.77°
- Argument of perihelion: 275.56°
- Earth MOID: 0.0009 AU (130,000 km)

Physical characteristics
- Mean diameter: 37 m (assumed); 15–70 meters
- Mass: 7.1×10^{7} kg (assumed)
- Absolute magnitude (H): 24.7

2000 SG_{344} is a small Aten asteroid first observed in 2000. It is assumed to have a diameter of approximately 37 meters (120 feet) – or roughly twice that of the Chelyabinsk meteor – and an assumed mass of 7.1×10^{7} kg (71,000 tonnes), but the size is only known within about a factor 2. As of February 2025, it is the largest object known to have a better than 1/1000 chance (0.1%) of impacting Earth and has the fifth highest cumulative Palermo scale rating at −2.77. The next good chance to observe the object will be in May 2028 when it passes 0.02 AU (3,000,000 km; 1,900,000 mi) from Earth.

Because of its very Earth-like orbit and because it would have been near the Earth in 1971 (coinciding with the Apollo program), there was speculation that 2000 SG_{344} might not be an asteroid but a man-made object such as an S-IVB booster stage from a Saturn V rocket which would make it about 15 meters in diameter and much less massive. (cf. J002E3, the S-IVB booster of Apollo 12 which was mistaken for an asteroid.)

Upcoming Earth approaches
Date & time	Nominal distance	uncertainty region (3-sigma)
2028-May-07 03:32 ± 4 minutes	2931689 km	± 46000 km
2030-Sep-22 22:36 ± 10 hours	5121080 km	± 380000 km

== Possible impacts with Earth ==
Until December 2004, it was considered to have the highest (though still very low) likelihood of any near-Earth object to impact Earth in the next 100 years. It is ranked a zero on the Torino scale of impact risk because of its small size (the scale is 0–10) and is listed on Sentry Risk Table. It was briefly surpassed in December 2004 by 99942 Apophis (which at the time was known only by its provisional designation 2004 MN_{4}). Smaller asteroids such as 2006 JY26 and 2006 RH120 have a greater chance of impacting Earth.

Based on 31 observations of 2000 SG_{344} made from May 1999 to October 2000, there is about a 1 in 360 chance that it will collide with Earth between 2069 and 2121. The greatest chance of impact is on 16 September 2071 with a 1 in 1000 chance of impact. Assuming the object is a rocky asteroid and that it reaches Earth's surface without exploding in the atmosphere, the impact energy released would be an estimated 1.0 megatons of TNT, comparable to the Tunguska and Chelyabinsk events, which could create an impact crater approximately 100 feet (30 m) wide.

Virtual impactors
Date	Impact probability (1 in)	JPL Horizons nominal geocentric distance (AU)	NEODyS nominal geocentric distance (AU)	uncertainty region (3-sigma)
2069-09-18	5 million	0.07 AU (10 million km)	0.08 AU (12 million km)	± 32 million km
2070-09-17	4300	0.18 AU (27 million km)	0.14 AU (21 million km)	± 275 million km
2071-09-10	7100	0.43 AU (64 million km)	0.35 AU (52 million km)	± 462 million km
2071-09-16	1000	0.44 AU (66 million km)	0.36 AU (54 million km)	± 475 million km

== Proposed NASA mission ==
In 2008, NASA considered this asteroid as a possible target for a crewed mission (Artemis II) using the Orion spacecraft, prior to a projected 2030 push to Mars. Those plans were since abandoned. 2000 SG_{344} will be observable in May 2028 at an apparent magnitude of 19.
