= 1979 XB =

Lost near-Earth asteroid

Discovery
- Discovered by: Siding Spring Obs.
- Discovery site: Siding Spring Obs.
- Discovery date: 11 December 1979 (first observed only)

Designations
- Minor planet category: Lost · Apollo · NEO · PHA · risk listed

Orbital characteristics
- Epoch 14 December 1979 (JD 2444221.5)
- Uncertainty parameter 9
- Observation arc: 3.9 days
- Aphelion: 3.8±0.7 AU (Q)
- Perihelion: 0.65±0.01 AU (q)
- Semi-major axis: 2.2±0.4 AU (a)
- Eccentricity: 0.7±0.06 (e)
- Orbital period (sidereal): 3.3±0.9 years
- Mean anomaly: 346°±4° (M)
- Mean motion: 0° 17^{m} 46.68^{s} / day
- Inclination: 24.7°±1.6° (i)
- Longitude of ascending node: 86°±0.12° (Ω)
- Argument of perihelion: 75.6°±0.7° (ω)
- Earth MOID: 0.02 AU (7.8 LD)?

Physical characteristics
- Mean diameter: 660 m (est.); 500–1000 meters
- Absolute magnitude (H): 18.6?

1979 XB is a lost asteroid with a short observation arc of 3.9 days that cannot be recovered with targeted observations and awaits serendipitous survey observations. It is classified as a near-Earth object and potentially hazardous asteroid of the Apollo group and is estimated to be 660 meters (2,200 feet) in diameter. The unnumbered minor planet has a poorly constrained orbit and has not been observed in 46 years. It has been listed on the Sentry Risk Table since the list started in 2002. As of 11 February 2025, With a cumulative Palermo scale rating of −2.70, the poorly known orbit and assumed size place 1979 XB fourth on an unconstrained listing of the Sentry Risk Table.

1979 XB was first observed on 11 December 1979 by astronomers at the Siding Spring Observatory, Australia, when the asteroid was estimated to be 0.09 ± 0.02 AU (13.5 ± 3.0 million km) from Earth and had a solar elongation of 127°. The object has never been confirmed by a second observatory. The uncertainty region for this asteroid is now hundreds of millions of kilometers long.

== Orbit-fit ==
With a short 4-day observation arc, the trajectory is poorly constrained and the uncertainties fit numerous different orbits. The perihelion point (closest approach to the Sun) is better known than the aphelion point (furthest distance from the Sun). Due to the uncertainty, the orbital period ranges from 2.4 to 4.2 years.

Epoch 2019 orbit fits for 1979 XB
Source	Aphelion	Orbital period	Earth MOID
MPC	3.8 AU (570 million km)	3.31 years (1,210 d)	0.02 AU (3.0 million km)
NEODyS	4.5 AU (670 million km)	4.10 years (1,496 d)	0.001 AU (150 thousand km)

== 2024 ==
Around mid-December 2024 the asteroid had about a 0.05% chance of making an Earth approach within 0.1 AU. If it did make an Earth approach, it did not come any closer than 0.005 AU (750,000 km; 460,000 mi). The nominal JPL Horizons December 2024 Earth distance is 4 AU (600,000,000 km; 370,000,000 mi) with an uncertainty of more than a billion km.

== 2056 virtual impactor ==
JPL Horizons suggests that the closest approach the asteroid will make to Earth in 2056 is a distant 1.2 AU (180,000,000 km; 110,000,000 mi) on 4 August 2056. NEODyS expects the closest Earth approach to be an even more distant 3.1 AU (460,000,000 km; 290,000,000 mi) on 2 October 2056.

With a short 4-day observation arc, as of February 2025, the Sentry Risk Table shows an estimated 1 in 5.3 million chance of the asteroid impacting Earth on 12 December 2056. The nominal JPL Horizons 12 December 2056 Earth distance is 3 AU (450,000,000 km; 280,000,000 mi) with a 3-sigma uncertainty of ±13 billion km. NEODyS lists the nominal 12 December 2056 Earth distance as 3.6 AU (540,000,000 km; 330,000,000 mi).

The Sentry Risk Table also lists potential impacts in 2086, 2102 and 2113.

Virtual impactors
Date	Sentry impact probability (1 in)	JPL Horizons nominal geocentric distance & uncertainty region (AU)	NEODyS nominal geocentric distance (AU)
2056-12-12	5.3 million	3.0 AU (450 million km) ±89.6 AU (13,400 million km)	3.2 AU (480 million km)
2086-12-16	9.1 million	3.3 AU (490 million km) ±64.9 AU (9,710 million km)	3.3 AU (490 million km)
2102-12-16	8.3 billion	0.4 AU (60 million km) ±76.8 AU (11,490 million km)	0.6 AU (90 million km)
2113-12-14	1.8 million	3.9 AU (580 million km) ±32.0 AU (4,790 million km)	3.9 AU (580 million km)

== See also ==
- 2007 FT3
- List of unnumbered minor planets § 1970–1979
