= 2021 EU =

Risk–listed near-Earth asteroid

Discovery
- Discovered by: Pan-STARRS
- Discovery date: 4 March 2021

Designations
- Minor planet category: NEO; Apollo; risk listed

Orbital characteristics
- Epoch 2021-Mar-06 (JD 2459279.5)
- Uncertainty parameter 8
- Observation arc: 15 days
- Aphelion: 3.58 AU (Q)
- Perihelion: 0.565 AU (q)
- Semi-major axis: 2.07 AU (a)
- Eccentricity: 0.727 (e)
- Orbital period (sidereal): 2.99 years
- Mean anomaly: 17.2° (M)
- Inclination: 3.84° (i)
- Longitude of ascending node: 157.8° (Ω)
- Time of perihelion: 2024-Jan-08? 2021-Jan-12
- Argument of perihelion: 269° (ω)
- Earth MOID: 0.00012 AU (18,000 km)
- Jupiter MOID: 1.8 AU (270,000,000 km)

Physical characteristics
- Dimensions: ~28 m (92 ft); 22–49 meters
- Absolute magnitude (H): 25.4

2021 EU is a small near-Earth object that may have passed within 0.4 AU (60 million km) of Earth in 2024. On 27 February 2024 it had a 1-in-32,000 chance of impacting Earth. It is estimated to be 28-meters in diameter which would make it larger than the Chelyabinsk meteor. It has a short observation arc of 15 days and has not been observed since 17 March 2021 when it was 0.23 AU (34 million km) from Earth. On 27 February 2024 it was nominally expected to be 0.09 AU (13 million km) from Earth but had an uncertainty region of ±45 million km (0.30 AU). The nominal 2024 Earth approach would have the asteroid only brightening to apparent magnitude 23 near closest approach.

2024 Virtual impactor
Date	Impact probability (1 in)	JPL Horizons nominal geocentric distance (AU)	NEODyS nominal geocentric distance (AU)	MPC nominal geocentric distance (AU)	Find_Orb nominal geocentric distance (AU)	uncertainty region (3-sigma)
2024-02-27	32000	0.09 AU (13 million km)	0.10 AU (15 million km)	0.10 AU (15 million km)	0.07 AU (10 million km)	± 45 million km

The nominal orbit has it come to perihelion (closest approach to the Sun) on 8 January 2024 and then pass 0.075 AU (11.2 million km) from Earth on 22 February 2024.
