= 2006 QV89 =

Asteroid

2006 QV_{89}
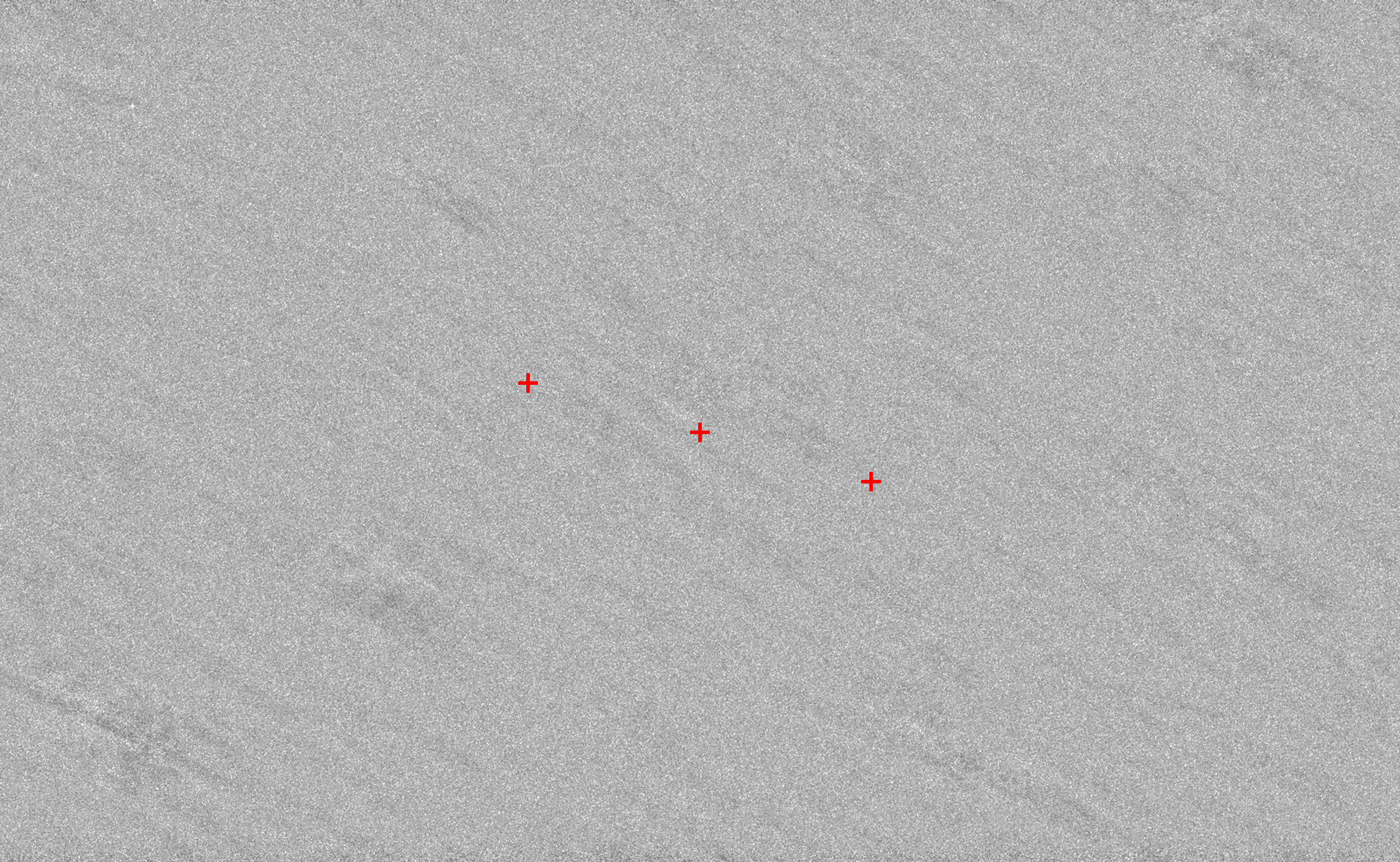
- The region of the sky where astronomers looked for asteroid 2006 QV89.

Discovery
- Discovered by: Catalina Sky Survey (703)
- Discovery date: 29 August 2006

Designations
- Minor planet category: Apollo; NEO

Orbital characteristics
- Epoch 21 November 2025 (JD 2461000.5)
- Uncertainty parameter 0
- Observation arc: 12.95 years
- Aphelion: 1.4609 AU (218,550,000 km) (Q)
- Perihelion: 0.92499 AU (138,377,000 km) (q)
- Semi-major axis: 1.1929 AU (178,460,000 km) (a)
- Eccentricity: 0.22461 (e)
- Orbital period (sidereal): 1.30 yr
- Mean anomaly: 233.68° (M)
- Inclination: 1.0685° (i)
- Longitude of ascending node: 165.81° (Ω)
- Argument of perihelion: 236.60° (ω)
- Earth MOID: 0.0000118 AU (1,770 km)
- Jupiter MOID: 3.91 AU (585,000,000 km)

Physical characteristics
- Dimensions: ~30 m (100 ft); 23–52 m (CNEOS)
- Absolute magnitude (H): 25.5

2006 QV_{89} is an Apollo near-Earth asteroid roughly 30 meters (100 feet) in diameter. It was discovered on 29 August 2006 when the asteroid was about 0.03 AU (4,500,000 km; 2,800,000 mi) from Earth and had a solar elongation of 150 degrees.

== Recovery ==
The asteroid was recovered on 11 August 2019 by the Canada–France–Hawaii Telescope, extending the observation arc from 10 days to 12 years. 2006 QV_{89} will make a closest approach to Earth on 19 December 2032 at a distance of 0.02049 AU (3,065,000 km; 1,905,000 mi). The August 2019 orbit solution passed about 600000 km further from Earth than the 2006 orbit solution. (Note: (0.0463 − 0.0422) * 149597870.7 km = 613351 km) It was removed from the Sentry Risk Table on 11 August 2019.

== Possible Earth impact ==
2006 QV_{89} has a low 1.07° orbital inclination with respect to the Ecliptic plane and an Earth-MOID of only 10200 km. Where Earth will be on a given date was known, but given the relatively old and short observation arc (10 days in 2006) it could not be predicted accurately where the asteroid will be on its orbit. Based on the available data, the Sentry Risk Table showed an estimated 1 in 9100 chance of the asteroid impacting Earth on 9 September 2019. The nominal JPL Horizons 9 September 2019 Earth distance was 0.05 AU (7,500,000 km; 4,600,000 mi) with a 3-sigma uncertainty of ± 10 million km. NEODyS also listed the nominal 9 September 2019 Earth distance as 0.05 AU (7,500,000 km; 4,600,000 mi). The European Space Agency listed the odds of impact at a comparable 1 in 7300 on 9 September 2019.

A Monte Carlo simulation using Solex 12 with 1000 clones of the asteroid showed that the asteroid's possible positions overlap Earth. The line of variation (LOV) passed over Antarctica and the southern tip of Argentina.

=== Impact ruled ===
While the position of the asteroid was too uncertain as of July 2019 to recover it, it was known where it would be if it were on a collision course. Based on non-observations from 4 to 5 July 2019, the impact was ruled out on 16 July 2019, using the Very Large Telescope in Chile. The detection (or lack thereof) of asteroids by this method may be useful for ruling out other potential collisions.

The asteroid came to opposition (opposite the Sun in the sky) on 28 July 2019 at an apparent magnitude of ~22.

== See also ==
- 2018 VP1
- 2020 VV
