= 2017 XO2 =

Sub-kilometer asteroid and near-Earth object

2017 XO_{2}
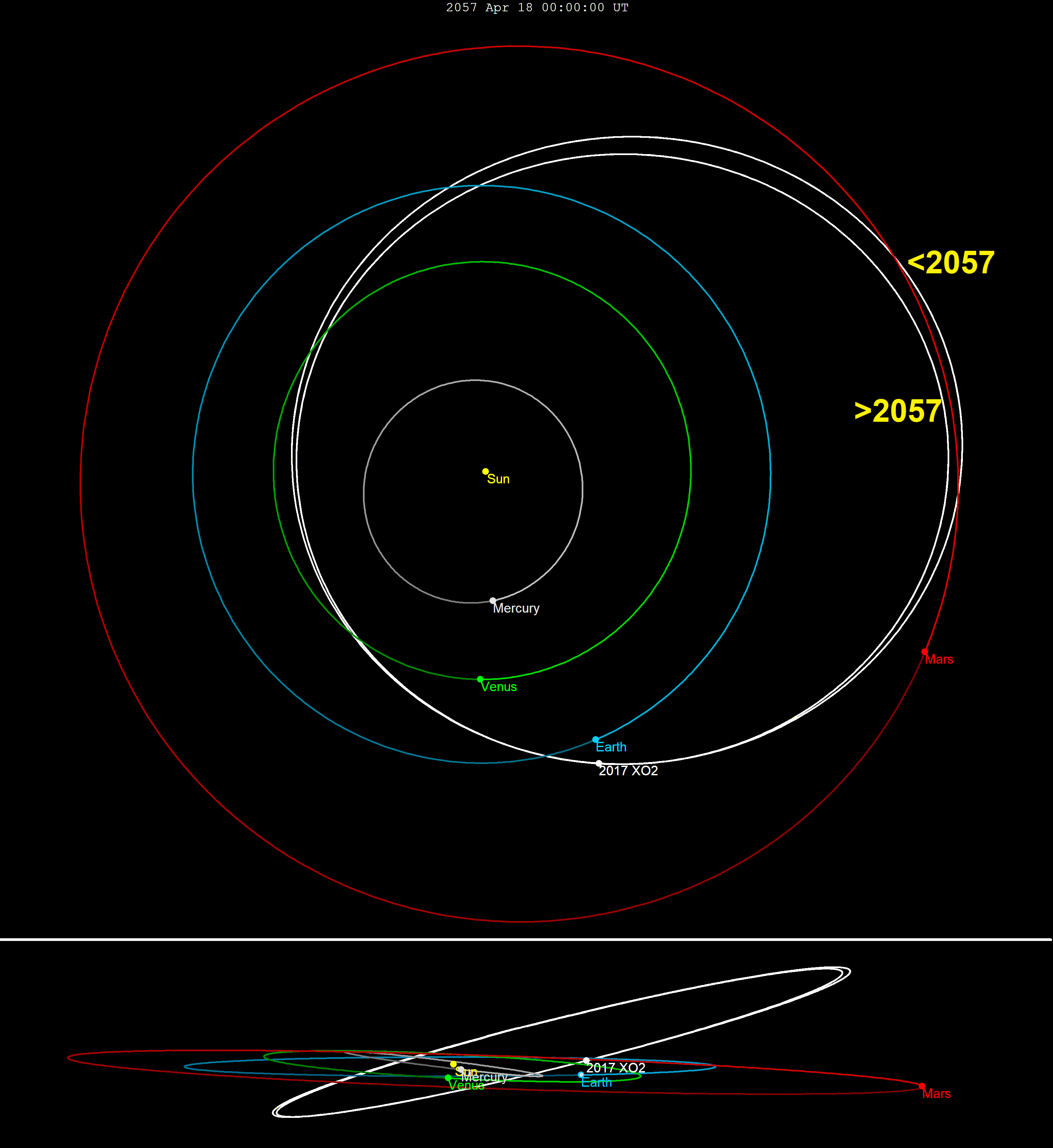
- Orbit crossing from Venus to Mars, before and after 2057 Earth flyby

Discovery
- Discovered by: Pan-STARRS
- Discovery site: Haleakala Obs.
- Discovery date: 10 December 2017 (first observed only)

Designations
- Minor planet category: NEO · Apollo

Orbital characteristics
- Epoch 23 March 2018 (JD 2458200.5)
- Uncertainty parameter 0
- Observation arc: 6.21 yr (2,268 d)
- Aphelion: 1.5451 AU
- Perihelion: 0.7198 AU
- Semi-major axis: 1.1325 AU
- Eccentricity: 0.3644
- Orbital period (sidereal): 1.21 yr (440 d)
- Mean anomaly: 160.18°
- Mean motion: 0° 49^{m} 4.08^{s} / day
- Inclination: 14.523°
- Longitude of ascending node: 218.37°
- Argument of perihelion: 93.787°
- Earth MOID: 0.00027 AU (0.11 LD)

Physical characteristics
- Mean diameter: 100 m (est. at 0.20); 110 m (sentry est.); 200 m (est. at 0.05)
- Absolute magnitude (H): 22.4

2017 XO_{2} is a sub-kilometer asteroid and near-Earth object of the Apollo group approximately 110 meters (360 feet) in diameter. The asteroid was discovered by Pan-STARRS in December 2017, after it already had approached Earth at 0.051 AU (7,600,000 km) or 20 lunar distances (LD) on 6 November 2017. On 26 April 2057, it will pass Earth at a similar distance of 21 LD again.

== Discovery and observations ==
2017 XO_{2} was discovered by Pan-STARRS at Haleakala Observatory, Hawaii, on 10 December 2017, when the asteroid was about 0.3 AU (45,000,000 km; 28,000,000 mi) from Earth and had a solar elongation of 125°.

On 20 January 2018 with a 40-day observation arc, it reached Torino scale 1 with an estimated 1 in 3000 chance of impacting Earth on 28 April 2057. The nominal JPL Horizons 28 April 2057 Earth distance was estimated at 0.001 AU (100,000 km; 90,000 mi) with a 3-sigma uncertainty of ±52 million km. NEODyS listed the nominal 28 April 2057 Earth distance at 0.03 AU (4,500,000 km; 2,800,000 mi). A Monte Carlo simulation using Solex 12 with 1000 clones of the asteroid generated one impactor.

On 27 January 2018 Pan-STARRS precovery images from November and December 2011 were announced, and 2017 XO_{2} was removed from the Sentry Risk Table. These precovery images extended the observation arc from 40 days to 6.21 years. It is now known that on 26 April 2057 the asteroid will be just past closest approach roughly 0.056 AU (8,400,000 km; 5,200,000 mi) from Earth with a 3-sigma uncertainty of ±3000 km.

The asteroid was last observed on 20 January 2018 at apparent magnitude 24 by T14 Mauna Kea. As the asteroid is becoming very faint, further observations during this approach are difficult. The next good chance to recover the asteroid will be between March and late April 2022 when the asteroid will pass about 0.0544 AU (8,140,000 km; 5,060,000 mi) from Earth.

== Orbit and classification ==
2017 XO_{2} is an Apollo asteroid, the largest group of near-Earth objects and Earth-crossing asteroids with approximately 10 thousand known members. It orbits the Sun at a distance of 0.72–1.55 AU once every 15 months (440 days; semi-major axis of 1.13 AU). Its orbit has an eccentricity of 0.36 and an inclination of 15° with respect to the ecliptic. The asteroid has a notably low minimum orbital intersection distance with Earth of 40,400 km (0.00027 AU), or 0.11 LD.

== Physical characteristics ==
On the Sentry Risk Table, the object had an estimated mean diameter of 110 meters (360 feet). Based on a generic magnitude-to-diameter conversion, 2017 XO_{2} measures between 100 and 200 meters in diameter, for an absolute magnitude of 22.4, and an assumed albedo between 0.05 and 0.20, which represent typical values for carbonaceous and stony asteroids, respectively. As of 2018, no rotational lightcurve of this object has been obtained from photometric observations. The body's rotation period, pole and shape remain unknown.

== Numbering and naming ==
This minor planet has neither been numbered nor named.
