= (367789) 2011 AG5 =

Near-Earth asteroid in 2040

(367789) 2011 AG_{5}
- Animation of 2011 AG_{5} rotating in radar images by the Goldstone Solar System Radar on 4 February 2023

Discovery
- Discovered by: Mount Lemmon Srvy.
- Discovery site: Mount Lemon Obs.
- Discovery date: 8 January 2011

Designations
- Minor planet category: Apollo · NEO · PHA

Orbital characteristics
- Epoch 2023-Feb-25 (JD 2460000.5)
- Uncertainty parameter 0
- Observation arc: 14.2 yr (5,201 days)
- Earliest precovery date: 3 October 2008
- Aphelion: 1.978 AU
- Perihelion: 0.87066 AU
- Semi-major axis: 1.424 AU
- Eccentricity: 0.3887
- Orbital period (sidereal): 1.7 yr (620.9 days)
- Mean anomaly: 348.2°
- Mean motion: 0° 34^{m} 33.222^{s} / day
- Inclination: 3.6946°
- Longitude of ascending node: 135.6°
- Time of perihelion: 2023-Mar-17
- Argument of perihelion: 54.02°
- Earth MOID: 0.00038 AU (57,000 km; 0.15 LD)

Physical characteristics
- Dimensions: 140 m
- Mass: 4×10^{9} kg (assumed)
- Absolute magnitude (H): 21.9

(367789) 2011 AG_{5} is a sub-kilometer asteroid, classified as a near-Earth object and potentially hazardous asteroid of the Apollo group. It has a diameter of about 140 meters (460 ft). It was removed from the Sentry Risk Table on 21 December 2012 and as such it now has a rating of 0 on the Torino Scale. It was recovered in December 2022 extending the observation arc from 4.8 years to 14 years. As of 2023, the distance between the orbits of Earth and 2011 AG_{5} is 0.0004 AU (60,000 km; 0.16 LD)

Earth Approaches on 3 February 2023 and 4 February 2040
| Date | JPL Horizons nominal geocentric distance (AU) | uncertainty region (3-sigma) |
|---|---|---|
| 2023-Feb-03 08:51 ± 00:01 | 0.01215 AU (1.818 million km) | ±112 km |
| 2040-Feb-04 08:29 ± 00:06 | 0.00725 AU (1.085 million km) | ±5800 km |

== Description ==
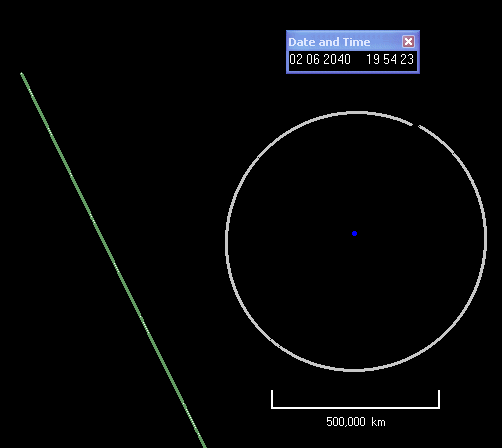
Orbital diagram of 2011 AG_{5} (green) passing the Earth–Moon system in February 2040 (orbital solution from 2011)

2011 AG_{5} was discovered on 8 January 2011 by the Mount Lemmon Survey at an apparent magnitude of 19.6 using a 1.52-meter (60 in) reflecting telescope. Pan-STARRS precovery images from 8 November 2010 extended the observation arc to 317 days. Observations by the Gemini 8.2-metre (320 in) telescope at Mauna Kea recovered the asteroid on 20, 21 and 27 October 2012, and extended the observation arc to 719 days.

The October 2012 observations reduced the orbit uncertainties by more than a factor of 60, meaning that the Earth's position in February 2040 no longer falls within the range of possible future paths for the asteroid. On 4 February 2040 the asteroid will pass no closer than 0.007 AU (1,000,000 km; 650,000 mi) (~2.8 LD) from Earth. Until 21 December 2012 it was listed on the Sentry Risk Table with a rating on the Torino Scale of Level 1. A Torino rating of 1 is a routine discovery in which a pass near the Earth is predicted that poses no unusual level of danger. It is estimated that an impact would produce the equivalent of 100 megatons of TNT, roughly twice that of the most powerful nuclear weapon ever detonated (Tsar Bomba). This is powerful enough to damage a region at least a hundred miles wide.

=== Older risks ===
Virtual clones of the asteroid that fit the mid-2012 uncertainty region in the known trajectory showed four potential impacts between 2040 and 2047. It had a 1 in 500 chance of impacting the Earth on 5 February 2040. In September 2013, there was an opportunity to make additional observations of 2011 AG_{5} when it came within 0.98 AU (147,000,000 km; 91,000,000 mi) of Earth. The 2013 observations allowed a further refinement to the known trajectory. The asteroid also passed 0.0121 AU (1,810,000 km; 1,120,000 mi) from the Earth on 3 February 2023. The 2023 gravitational keyhole was 227 miles (365 kilometers) wide. With a Palermo scale rating of –1.00, the odds of impact by 2011 AG_{5} were about 10 times less than the background hazard level of Earth impacts which is defined as the average risk posed by objects of the same size or larger over the years until the date of the potential impact.
