= (471240) 2011 BT15 =

Stony, sub-kilometer sized asteroid and fast rotator

(471240) 2011 BT_{15}
Discovery
- Discovered by: Pan-STARRS
- Discovery site: Haleakala Obs.
- Discovery date: 24 January 2011

Designations
- Minor planet category: NEO · PHA · Apollo

Orbital characteristics
- Epoch 4 September 2017 (JD 2458000.5)
- Uncertainty parameter 0
- Observation arc: 9.63 yr (3,519 days)
- Aphelion: 1.6842 AU
- Perihelion: 0.9018 AU
- Semi-major axis: 1.2930 AU
- Eccentricity: 0.3025
- Orbital period (sidereal): 1.47 yr (537 days)
- Mean anomaly: 204.24°
- Mean motion: 0° 40^{m} 13.08^{s} / day
- Inclination: 1.6613°
- Longitude of ascending node: 105.37°
- Argument of perihelion: 308.78°
- Earth MOID: 0.0008 AU · 0.3 LD

Physical characteristics
- Mean diameter: 0.136 km (calculated); 0.150 km
- Mass: 4.9×10^{9} kg (assumed)
- Synodic rotation period: 0.109138±0.000002 h
- Geometric albedo: 0.20 (assumed)
- Spectral type: S
- Absolute magnitude (H): 21.7

(471240) 2011 BT_{15} is a stony, sub-kilometer sized asteroid and fast rotator, classified as a near-Earth object and potentially hazardous asteroid of the Apollo group. It had been one of the objects with the highest impact threat on the Palermo Technical Impact Hazard Scale.

== Discovery ==
It was discovered on 24 January 2011, by a team of astronomers at Pan-STARRS, the Panoramic Survey Telescope and Rapid Response System at Haleakala Observatory on Hawaii, United States. The discovery was made using a 1.8-meter Ritchey–Chrétien telescope. At the time of discovery, the object had an apparent magnitude of 22.

== Orbit ==
Before the 2013 recovery it had an observation arc of 41 days with an uncertainty parameter of 7. Due to precovery images from 2007 it now has an observation arc of more than 5 years. It makes close approaches to Earth and Mars.

On 28 December 2013, it passed 0.03222 AU (4,820,000 km) from Earth. The December 2013 passage was studied by the Goldstone Deep Space Network and further refined the orbit.

=== Impact risk ===
While listed on the Sentry Risk Table, virtual clones of the asteroid that fit the uncertainty region in the known trajectory showed a 1 in 71,000 chance that the asteroid could impact Earth on 5 January 2080.

In 2013 it had the 5th highest impact threat on the Palermo Technical Impact Hazard Scale. It was removed from the Sentry Risk Table on 17 June 2013.

With a 2080 Palermo Technical Scale of −3.58, the odds of impact by 2011 BT_{15} in 2080 were about 3800 times less than the background hazard level of Earth impacts which is defined as the average risk posed by objects of the same size or larger over the years until the date of the potential impact. JPL Horizons shows that the nominal pass will be on 17 January 2080 at a distance of 0.125 AU (18,700,000 km; 11,600,000 mi) from Earth.

== Physical characteristics ==
This near-Earth object is characterized as a common, stony S-type asteroid by the Collaborative Asteroid Lightcurve Link (CALL).

=== Fast rotator ===
In January 2014, a rotational lightcurve of 2011 BT_{15} was obtained from photometric observations by American astronomer Brian Warner at the CS3-Palmer Divide Station (U82) in California. Lightcurve analysis gave a well-defined rotation period of 0.109138 hours (393 seconds) with a brightness amplitude of 0.61 magnitude (U=3).

=== Diameter and albedo ===
According to the CALL and JPL's impact-risk table, this near-Earth object measures 136 and 150 meters, respectively. For its size estimate, CALL uses a standard for stony asteroids of 0.20 with an absolute magnitude of 21.7.

== Naming ==
As of 2017, this minor planet remains unnamed.
