= 2020 VV =

Small risk–listed near-Earth asteroid

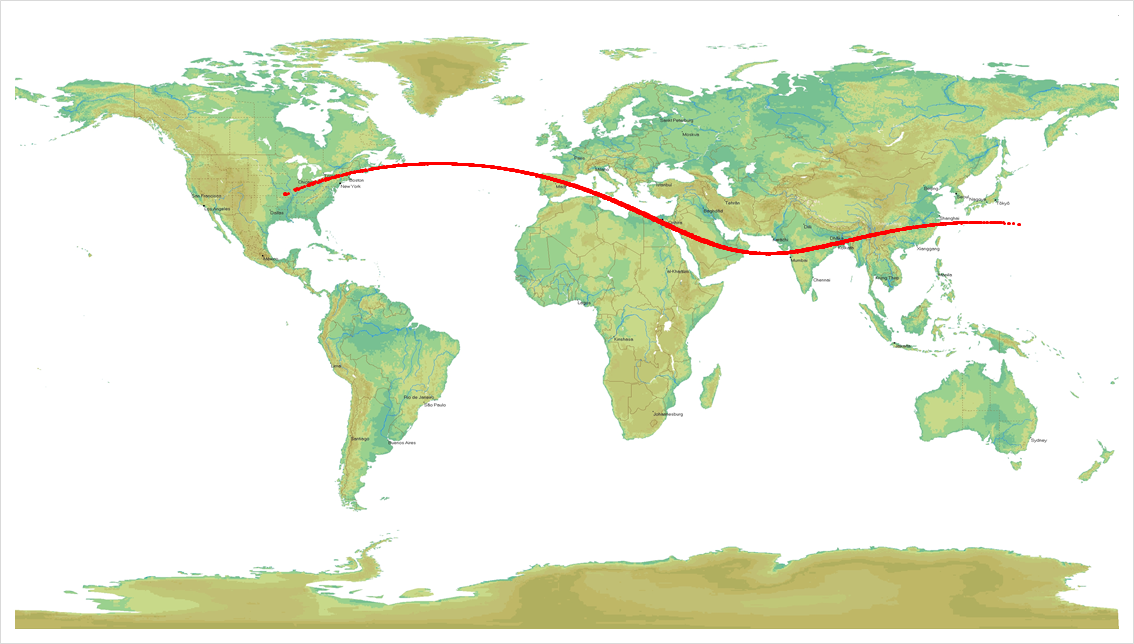
- The risk corridor for the obsolete 2033 virtual impactor passed over the northeastern USA, Spain, Saudi Arabia, India, and China.

Discovery
- Discovered by: Mount Lemmon Survey (G96)
- Discovery date: 5 November 2020

Designations
- Minor planet category: Apollo; NEO; risk listed

Orbital characteristics
- Epoch 2020-May-31 (JD 2459000.5)
- Uncertainty parameter 5
- Observation arc: 61 days
- Earliest precovery date: 17 October 2020
- Aphelion: 1.2367 AU (185,010,000 km) (Q)
- Perihelion: 0.9830 AU (147,050,000 km) (q)
- Semi-major axis: 1.1099 AU (166,040,000 km) (a)
- Eccentricity: 0.1143 (e)
- Orbital period (sidereal): 1.17 yr
- Mean anomaly: 268.100° (M)
- Inclination: 0.350° (i)
- Longitude of ascending node: 20.148° (Ω)
- Argument of perihelion: 330.663° (ω)
- Earth MOID: 14,800 km
- Jupiter MOID: 3.96 AU (592,000,000 km)

Physical characteristics
- Mean diameter: ~12 meters (40 feet); 10–22 meters (CNEOS)
- Absolute magnitude (H): 27.25

2020 VV is an Apollo near-Earth asteroid roughly 12 meters (40 feet) in diameter. On 20 November 2020, the asteroid had a 4.4% chance of impacting Earth on 12 October 2033 11:43 UT. As of mid-December 2020, the asteroid has a modest 61 day observation arc. The nominal Earth approach is on 17 October 2033 at a distance of 0.009 AU (1,300,000 km; 840,000 mi), but the line of variations (LOV) is only known with an accuracy of ±22 hours. The line of variations allows the asteroid to come as close as 0.006 AU (900,000 km; 560,000 mi) or pass as far away as 0.01 AU (1,500,000 km; 930,000 mi). With a diameter range of 10–22 meters the asteroid could be as large as the Chelyabinsk meteor.

2020 VV was discovered on 5 November 2020 when it was about 0.036 AU (5,400,000 km; 3,300,000 mi) from Earth and had a solar elongation of 150 degrees. It has a very low 0.35° orbital inclination with respect to the ecliptic plane and an Earth-MOID of only 14,800 km. The asteroid passed Earth on 21 October 2020 at a distance of 0.0215 AU (3,220,000 km; 2,000,000 mi).

Where Earth will be on a given date is known, but given the short observation arc where precisely the asteroid will be on its orbit in 2033 is not. A slight variation in the known orbit of the asteroid can cause the asteroid to be early, right on time (impact solution), or late. (Note: Earth traveling at 30 km/s and with a diameter of 12,800 km, only blocks the path of single virtual impactor for about 8 minutes (30*60*8). Due to an Earth-like orbit, the virtual asteroids can impact Earth for about ±2.5 hours centered around the virtual impactor at 12 October 2033 11:43 UT. If 2020 VV is not crossing Earth's orbit during that time there can be no impact.)

Impact probabilities are calculated independently by Sentry, NEODyS-2 and ESA's Space Situational Awareness Programme. Different models result in slightly different orbit solutions, nominal close approach distances, and impact probabilities. With a long enough observation arc these solutions will converge. In general when the nominal approach is closer to the impact scenario, the odds of impact are greater.

Line of variation (LOV) and different closest approaches
Date and time	Nominal closest approach	Position uncertainty (Note: The JPL SBDB close-approach data min/max distance and time of close approach uncertainty correspond to the 3-sigma level. Stretching "Semi-major axis (km)" corresponds to the 1-sigma uncertainty. 3-sigma uncertainty is 3 times larger.)	Impact probability on 12 Oct 2033 (Note: Impact probability examples: 1.00 would be 100%. 2.00E-2 would be 2%.)	Reference
12 October 2033 11:43	expired impact scenario	±2.5 hours		Sentry
17 October 2033 08:57	0.0089 AU (1,330,000 km)	0.000734 AU (109,800 km)	none	ESA
17 October 2033 09:30	0.0090 AU (1,350,000 km)	0.0008398 AU (125,630 km)	none	JPL SBDB
17 October 2033 13:26	0.0094 AU (1,410,000 km)	0.000851 AU (127,300 km)	none	NEODyS-2

The line of variation (risk corridor) for 2033 passed over the northeastern USA, Spain, Saudi Arabia, India, and China.

The greatest chances of impact were listed between 17 and 20 November 2020. On 17 November 2020 the Space Situational Awareness Programme listed a 4.2% chance (1 in 24) of impact, Sentry listed a 2.8% chance (1 in 36), and NEODyS-2 listed a cumulative 5.9% chance of impact. By 20 November 2020 with a 15-day observation arc NEODyS-2 listed a 4.4% chance (1 in 23) of impact. (Note: At the same time, NEODyS-2 listed an additional 0.15% chance (1 in 650) of impact at a later date, 10 October 2038.) At the same time, Sentry listed a 1.3% chance (1 in 77) of impact, and the Space Situational Awareness Programme listed a 1.6% chance (1 in 63).

2020 VV is not categorized as a potentially hazardous object, because the estimated size is significantly smaller than the threshold of about 140 meters for potentially hazardous objects.

Virtual impactors (61-day arc)
Date	Impact probability (1 in)	JPL Horizons nominal geocentric distance (AU)	uncertainty region (3-sigma)
2056-10-11 00:00	1500	0.095 AU (14.2 million km)	±100 million km
