= 2008 CK70 =

Apollo near-Earth asteroid

2008 CK_{70}
Discovery
- Discovered by: LINEAR (704)
- Discovery date: 9 February 2008

Designations
- Minor planet category: Apollo NEO,

Orbital characteristics
- Epoch 21 November 2025 (JD 2461000.5)
- Uncertainty parameter 6
- Observation arc: 35 days
- Earliest precovery date: 10 January 2008
- Aphelion: 1.6210 AU (242.50 Gm) (Q)
- Perihelion: 0.58509 AU (87.528 Gm) (q)
- Semi-major axis: 1.1030 AU (165.01 Gm) (a)
- Eccentricity: 0.46956 (e)
- Orbital period (sidereal): 1.16 yr (423.14 d)
- Mean anomaly: 69.242° (M)
- Mean motion: 0° 51^{m} 2.808^{s} /day (n)
- Inclination: 6.0666° (i)
- Longitude of ascending node: 145.62° (Ω)
- Argument of perihelion: 106.00° (ω)
- Earth MOID: 0.000110224 AU (16,489.3 km)

Physical characteristics
- Dimensions: ~31 meters (102 ft)
- Mass: 4.0×10^{7} kg (assumed)
- Absolute magnitude (H): 24.9

2008 CK_{70} is an Apollo near-Earth asteroid. In 2013 it had the 7th highest impact threat on the Palermo Technical Impact Hazard Scale. It was discovered on 9 February 2008 by Lincoln Near-Earth Asteroid Research (LINEAR) at an apparent magnitude of 19 using a 1.0-meter (39 in) reflecting telescope. It has an estimated diameter of 31 meters (102 ft) and is not large enough to qualify as a potentially hazardous object. Ten precovery images from January 2008 have been located. It was removed from the Sentry Risk Table on 21 December 2013. It might have been possible to recover the asteroid in late September 2017, although it would have had an apparent magnitude of about 22.

It has an observation arc of 35 days with an uncertainty parameter of 6. Perturbations by Earth and Venus will increase the orbital uncertainty over time. When the asteroid only had an observation arc of 5 days, virtual clones of the asteroid that fit the uncertainty region in the known trajectory showed a 1 in 2,700 chance that the asteroid could impact Earth on 14 February 2030. With a 2030 Palermo Technical Scale of −2.94, the odds of impact by 2008 CK_{70} in 2030 were about 870 times less than the background hazard level of Earth impacts which is defined as the average risk posed by objects of the same size or larger over the years until the date of the potential impact. The power of such an air burst would be somewhere between the Chelyabinsk meteor and the Tunguska event depending on the actual size of the asteroid. Using the nominal orbit, JPL Horizons shows that the asteroid will be 0.08 AU (12,000,000 km; 7,400,000 mi) from Earth on 14 February 2030. On 19 May 2031, the asteroid may pass as close as 0.0088 AU (1,320,000 km; 820,000 mi) from Venus.
