= 1994 WR12 =

Near-Earth asteroid

1994 WR_{12}
Discovery
- Discovered by: C. S. Shoemaker
- Discovery site: Palomar Obs.
- Discovery date: 28 November 1994

Designations
- Minor planet category: NEO · Aten

Orbital characteristics
- Epoch 2025-Nov-21 (JD 2461000.5)
- Uncertainty parameter 0
- Observation arc: 31.06 yr (11,345 d)
- Aphelion: 1.0576 AU (158.21 million km)
- Perihelion: 0.4560 AU (68.22 million km)
- Semi-major axis: 0.7568 AU (113.22 million km)
- Eccentricity: 0.39748
- Orbital period (sidereal): 240.5 days (0.658 yr)
- Mean anomaly: 152.77°
- Mean motion: 1° 29^{m} 49.56^{s} / day
- Inclination: 6.8465°
- Longitude of ascending node: 62.521°
- Argument of perihelion: 206.04°
- Earth MOID: 0.0015 AU (0.58 LD)

Physical characteristics
- Mean diameter: 130 m (est.); 92 – 210 m (CNEOS)
- Mass: 2.9×10^{9} kg (est.)
- Absolute magnitude (H): 22.4

1994 WR_{12} is an asteroid and near-Earth object approximately 130 meters (430 feet) in diameter. As a member of the Aten group almost all of its orbit is closer to the Sun than Earth is. On 24 November 1994 it passed about 374100 km from the Moon. First imaged at Kitami Observatory on 26 November 1994, it was discovered two nights later by American astronomer Carolyn S. Shoemaker at Palomar Observatory on 28 November 1994. The asteroid then went unobserved from 1994 until it was recovered by Mauna Kea in March 2016. It was removed from the Sentry Risk Table on 2 April 2016.

Close approaches
Date	JPL SBDB nominal geocentric distance	uncertainty region (3-sigma)
2021-11-29	6152189 km	± 34 km
2046-11-25	1633719 km	± 4133 km
2190-11-23	135000000 km	± 815 million km

== Description ==
1994 WR_{12} orbits the Sun at a distance of 0.5–1.1 AU once every 8 months (240 days). Its orbit has an eccentricity of 0.40 and an inclination of 7° with respect to the ecliptic.

It has an Earth minimum orbital intersection distance of 0.0018 AU (269,000 km), which translates into 0.7 lunar distances. On 25 November 2046, it will pass 1633719 km from Earth with an uncertainty of ±4133 km. While listed on the Sentry Risk Table the range for the 2046 close approach distance varied from 0.001 AU (150,000 km) to 0.039 AU (5,800,000 km) from Earth.

While listed on the Sentry Risk Table, virtual clones of the asteroid that fit the uncertainty in the known trajectory showed 116 potential impacts between 2054 and 2109. It had about a cumulative 1 in 9090 chance of impacting the Earth. The formerly poorly known trajectory of this asteroid was further complicated by close approaches to Venus and Mercury. It was recovered by Mauna Kea in March 2016, which extended the observation arc from 34 days to 21 years.

It is estimated that an impact would produce the equivalent of 77 megatons of TNT, roughly 1.5 times that of most powerful nuclear weapon ever detonated (Tsar Bomba).

It has a unique characteristic: it is coplanar with Mercury, it can be a fragment thrown away by an asteroid impact on Mercury, its very little MOID with the Earth can produce a meteor shower on Earth and if the meteoroids were large enough even Mercurian meteorites.

== See also ==
- Lost asteroids
