= 2019 TF7 =

Asteroid

2019 TF_{7}
Discovery
- Discovery date: 7 October 2019

Designations
- Minor planet category: Amor · NEO

Orbital characteristics
- Epoch 9 October 2019 (JD 2458765.5)
- Uncertainty parameter 7
- Observation arc: 23 days
- Aphelion: 4.23 AU
- Perihelion: 1.14 AU
- Semi-major axis: 2.69 AU
- Eccentricity: 0.574
- Orbital period (sidereal): 4.41 yr (1611 d)
- Mean anomaly: 24.9°
- Mean motion: 0° 16^{m} 23.88^{s} / day
- Inclination: 22.2°
- Longitude of ascending node: 280.5°
- Argument of perihelion: 53.9°
- Earth MOID: 0.24 AU (93 LD)
- Mars MOID: 0.05 AU (19 LD)

Physical characteristics
- Mean diameter: ~800 meters
- Absolute magnitude (H): 17.8

2019 TF_{7} is an asteroid from the inner regions of the asteroid belt, approximately 800 meters (0.50 miles) in diameter. It was discovered on 7 October 2019 and with the orbital uncertainty still high after 4 days of observation, it had the rare chance of impacting Earth in less than 2 years on 26 June 2021. The line of variation (LOV) was 730 million km long and overlapped Earth's position. It was listed at the top of the European Space Agency risk list due to its large size and near-term threat. Precovery images from 18 September 2019 were located, extending the observation arc to 23 days, and the object was removed from the Sentry Risk Table. On 26 June 2021 the asteroid will be 4.9 AU (730 million km) from Earth.

Obsolete virtual impactor with 4-day observation arc
Date	Impact probability (1 in)	JPL Horizons nominal geocentric distance (AU)	uncertainty region
2021-06-26	67 million	4.1 AU (610 million km)	±730 million km

== Orbit and classification ==
It is a member of the Flora family (402), a giant asteroid family and the largest family of stony asteroids in the main-belt. It orbits the Sun in the inner main-belt at a distance of 1.1–3.6 AU once every 3 years and 7 months (1,317 days; semi-major axis of 2.35 AU). Its orbit has an eccentricity of 0.53 and an inclination of 22° with respect to the ecliptic.
