= (454101) 2013 BP73 =

Sub-kilometer asteroid

(454101) 2013 BP_{73}
Discovery
- Discovered by: Mount Lemmon Srvy.
- Discovery site: Mount Lemmon Obs.
- Discovery date: 22 January 2013

Designations
- Minor planet category: NEO · Apollo · PHA

Orbital characteristics
- Epoch 23 March 2018 (JD 2458200.5)
- Uncertainty parameter 0
- Observation arc: 12.72 yr (4,645 days)
- Aphelion: 2.1631 AU
- Perihelion: 0.4931 AU
- Semi-major axis: 1.3281 AU
- Eccentricity: 0.6287
- Orbital period (sidereal): 1.53 yr (559 days)
- Mean anomaly: 218.36°
- Mean motion: 0° 38^{m} 38.4^{s} / day
- Inclination: 6.8507°
- Longitude of ascending node: 80.062°
- Argument of perihelion: 251.84°
- Earth MOID: 0.0021 AU (0.82 LD)

Physical characteristics
- Mean diameter: 0.31 km (estimate)
- Mass: 4.0×10^{10} kg (assumed)
- Absolute magnitude (H): 20.4

(454101) 2013 BP_{73} is a sub-kilometer asteroid, classified as a near-Earth object and potentially hazardous asteroid of the Apollo group, approximately 310 meters (1,020 ft) in diameter.

== Description ==
From discovery until August 2013 when Sentry updated to planetary ephemeris (DE431), it had the 4th highest impact threat on the Palermo Technical Impact Hazard Scale. It was discovered on 22 January 2013 by the Mount Lemmon Survey at an apparent magnitude of 21 using a 1.5-meter (59 in) reflecting telescope. It has an estimated diameter of 310 meters (1,020 ft). Six Precovery images from April 2003 have been located. It was removed from the Sentry Risk Table on 3 January 2014.

It has an observation arc of 10 years with an uncertainty parameter of 2. Perturbations by Earth, Venus, and Mercury will increase the orbital uncertainty over time. When the asteroid only had an observation arc of 52 days, virtual clones of the asteroid that fit the uncertainty region in the known trajectory showed a 1 in 588,000 chance that the asteroid could impact Earth on 11 December 2096. With a 2096 Palermo Technical Scale of −3.42, the odds of impact by 2013 BP_{73} in 2096 were about 2630 times less than the background hazard level of Earth impacts which is defined as the average risk posed by objects of the same size or larger over the years until the date of the potential impact. Using the nominal orbit, JPL Horizons shows that the asteroid will be 0.9 AU (130,000,000 km; 84,000,000 mi) from Earth on 11 December 2096. 2013 BP_{73} made a close approach to Earth around 17 December 2018 that allowed a refinement to the known trajectory.

== Numbering and naming ==
This minor planet was numbered by the Minor Planet Center on 25 December 2015 (M.P.C. 97517). As of 2018, it has not been named.
