= Near-Earth Object Confirmation Page =

Listing of possible NEOs for follow-up observation

The Near-Earth Object Confirmation Page (NEOCP) is a web service listing recently-submitted observations of objects that may be near-Earth objects (NEOs). It is a service of the Minor Planet Center (MPC), which is the official international archive for astrometric observations of minor planets. The NEOCP was established by the MPC on the World Wide Web in March 1996.

Astrometric observations of new NEO candidates are submitted by observers either through email or cURL, after which they are placed in the NEOCP for a period of time until they are confirmed to be a new object, confirmed to be an already-known object, or not confirmed with sufficient follow-up observations. If the object is confirmed as a new NEO, it is given a provisional designation and its observations will be immediately published in a Minor Planet Electronic Circular (MPEC). If the object is a recovery of an already-designated NEO on a new opposition, it will also be immediately published in an MPEC. Otherwise, if the object is confirmed as a minor planet that is not a NEO, it will be published in a Daily Orbit Update MPEC on the following day. Any objects that are not confirmed due to an insufficient observation arc or a false-positive detection will have its observations archived in the MPC's Isolated Tracklet File of unconfirmed minor planet candidates.

This tool is updated throughout the day to facilitate follow-up observations as quickly as possible before an object is lost and no longer observable.

A number of other services make use of the NEOCP and further process the data to make independent predictions of the likelihood of an object being an NEO and also of the likely risk of Earth impact, some of these are listed below.

== See also ==
- Scout: NEOCP Hazard Assessment
- Near-Earth object
- Asteroid impact prediction
- NEODyS
