= 2008 VL14 =

Near-Earth asteroid

2008 VL_{14}
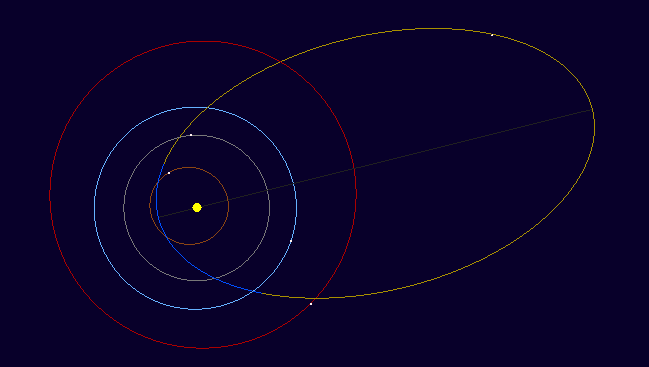
- Orbit of 2008 VL_{14}

Designations
- Minor planet category: Apollo asteroid, PHA

Orbital characteristics
- Epoch 20 November 2008 (JD 2454790.5)
- Uncertainty parameter 8
- Observation arc: 22 d
- Aphelion: 4.0259 AU
- Perihelion: 0.40253 AU
- Semi-major axis: 2.2142 AU
- Eccentricity: 0.81821
- Orbital period (sidereal): 3.2949 yr (1,203.4 days)
- Mean anomaly: 24.212°
- Mean motion: 0° 17^{m} 56.904^{s} / day
- Inclination: 1.9523°
- Longitude of ascending node: 40.021°
- Argument of perihelion: 243.80°
- Earth MOID: 0.0043326 AU

Physical characteristics
- Absolute magnitude (H): 21.1

2008 VL_{14} is a potentially hazardous asteroid of the Apollo class, discovered by the Mount Lemmon Survey on 9 November 2008. It has an average estimated diameter of 260 meters according to NASA's Center for Near-Earth Object Studies. Around 22 October 2054, 2008 VL_{14} is expected to pass about 0.09 AU (13 million km) from Earth, but could pass as close as 0.0002 AU (30 thousand km). The object is not risk-listed.

== See also ==
- 2015 XJ351
