= 2007 VK184 =

Small near-Earth asteroid

2007 VK_{184}
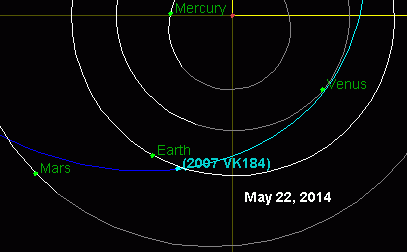
- The 2014 close approach of 2007 VK_{184}

Discovery
- Discovered by: Catalina Sky Survey (703)
- Discovery date: 12 November 2007

Designations
- Minor planet category: Apollo; NEO

Orbital characteristics
- Epoch 2025-Nov-21 (JD 2461000.5)
- Uncertainty parameter 0
- Observation arc: 15.58 years
- Aphelion: 2.7087 AU
- Perihelion: 0.74297 AU
- Semi-major axis: 1.7258 AU
- Eccentricity: 0.56950
- Orbital period (sidereal): 828.1 d (2.27 yr)
- Average orbital speed: 22.8 km/s (Note: v = 42.1219 √1/r − 0.5/a, where r is the distance from the Sun, and a is the major semi-axis. Average velocity is at r=a=1.7 AU.)
- Mean anomaly: 3.6569°
- Inclination: 1.2211°
- Longitude of ascending node: 253.52°
- Argument of perihelion: 73.666°
- Earth MOID: 0.00054 AU (81,000 km)
- Venus MOID: 0.055 AU (8,200,000 km)
- Mars MOID: 0.033 AU (4,900,000 km)

Physical characteristics
- Mean diameter: ~130 meters (430 ft)
- Mass: 3.3×10^{9} kg (assumed)
- Absolute magnitude (H): 22.06

2007 VK_{184} is a sub-kilometer asteroid, classified as a near-Earth object of the Apollo group, and estimated to be approximately 130 meters (430 ft) in diameter. It was listed on the Sentry Risk Table with a Torino Scale rating of 1 for a potential impactor in June 2048. It was removed from the Sentry Risk Table on 28 March 2014.

== 2023 ==
The asteroid came to opposition on 24 April 2023 when it had a solar elongation of 177 degrees and an apparent magnitude of 22. Then on 15 July 2023 the asteroid harmlessly passed 0.2275 AU (34.03 million km) from Earth.

== Description ==
2007 VK_{184} was discovered on 12 November 2007 by the Catalina Sky Survey. It was recovered on 26 March 2014 by Mauna Kea, and removed from the Sentry Risk Table on 28 March 2014. By 4 January 2008, with an observation arc of 52 days, there was a 1 in 2700 chance of an impact with Earth on 3 June 2048. The Sentry Risk Table, using an observation arc of 60 days, showed the asteroid had a 1 in 1820 chance (0.055%) of impacting Earth on 3 June 2048. Since the March 2014 recovery, it is known that the asteroid will pass 0.013 AU (1,900,000 km; 1,200,000 mi) from Earth on 2 June 2048.

=== 2014 passage ===
Before the 2014 close approach, the asteroid had a modest observation arc of 60 days, and the imprecise trajectory of this asteroid was complicated by close approaches to Earth, Venus and Mars. On 23 May 2014, the asteroid passed 0.17 AU (25,000,000 km; 16,000,000 mi) from Earth and reached an apparent magnitude of ~20.8. As expected the close approach allowed astronomers to recover the asteroid on 26 March 2014 and refine the odds of a future collision. As the asteroid gets closer to Earth, the positional uncertainty becomes larger. By recovering the asteroid well before closest approach you can avoid searching a larger region of the sky. Most asteroids rated 1 on the Torino Scale are later downgraded to 0 after more observations come in.

Risk assessments were calculated based on a diameter of 130 meters. It was estimated that, if it were ever to impact Earth, it would enter the atmosphere at a speed of 19.2 km/s and would have a kinetic energy equivalent to 150 megatons of TNT. Assuming the target surface is sedimentary rock, the asteroid would impact the ground with the equivalent of 40 megatons of TNT and create a 2.1 kilometers (1.3 mi) impact crater. Asteroids of approximately 130 meters in diameter are expected to impact Earth once every 11000 years or so.

=== 2048 ===
On 26–27 March 2014, additional observations were made which ruled out the chance of an impact in 2048. On 2 June 2048 the asteroid will pass 5 lunar distances from Earth with a 3-sigma uncertainty region of ±20000 km.

=== 2118 ===
By the Earth approach of June 2118 the known approaches become more divergent.

2118 Earth approach
| Date | Minimum possible approach | Maximum possible approach |
|---|---|---|
| 2118-Jun-06 ± 2 days | 0.00089 AU (133 thousand km) | 0.041 AU (6.1 million km) |

== See also ==
- 99942 Apophis, a NEO that, for a few days, was thought to have a slight probability of striking the Earth in 2029. But the likelihood that would happen was quickly determined to be zero.
