= (29075) 1950 DA =

Most hazardous risk–listed near-Earth asteroid

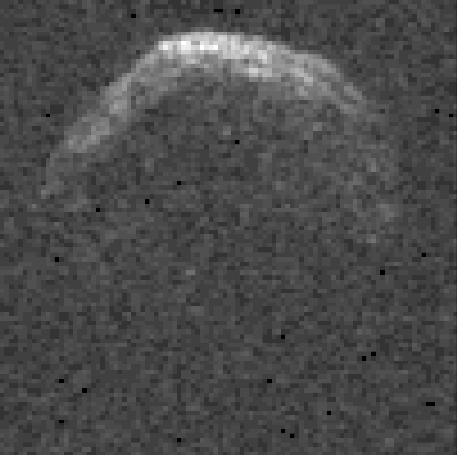
- Radar image of 1950 DA taken at Arecibo in March 2001, from a distance of 22 LD or 0.052 AU

Discovery
- Discovered by: Carl A. Wirtanen
- Discovery site: Lick Obs.
- Discovery date: 23 February 1950

Designations
- Alternative designations: 2000 YK_{66} · Object Wirtanen
- Minor planet category: NEO · Apollo · PHA · risk listed

Orbital characteristics
- Epoch 17 October 2024 (JD 2460600.5)
- Uncertainty parameter 0
- Observation arc: 74.87 yr (27,345 d)
- Aphelion: 2.5614 AU
- Perihelion: 0.8364 AU
- Semi-major axis: 1.6989 AU
- Eccentricity: 0.5077
- Orbital period (sidereal): 2.214 yr (809 d)
- Mean anomaly: 223.31°
- Mean motion: 0° 26^{m} 42.36^{s} / day
- Inclination: 12.16°
- Longitude of ascending node: 356.59°
- Argument of perihelion: 224.76°
- Earth MOID: 0.03853 AU (14.9948 LD)

Proper orbital elements
- Precession of perihelion long.: 13.655 arcsec / yr
- Precession of asc. node: −35.824 arcsec / yr

Physical characteristics
- Dimensions: 1.39 km × 1.46 km × 1.07 km
- Mean diameter: 1.3 km; 1.1 km; 1.25±0.12 km; 2.00±0.20 km
- Mass: >4×10^{12} kg (Note: A reported volume of 1.14 km^{3} × density of 3.5 g/cm^{3} yields a mass (m = d × v) of 3.99×10^{12} kg)
- Mean density: >3.5 g/cm^{3}
- Synodic rotation period: 2.12160±0.00004 h
- Geometric albedo: 0.070; 0.25
- Spectral type: S; B–V = 0.862±0.077; V–R = 0.494±0.069; V–I = 0.816±0.067
- Absolute magnitude (H): 16.83; 17.00; 17.28; 17.2; 17.1

(29075) 1950 DA is a risk-listed asteroid, classified as a near-Earth object and potentially hazardous asteroid of the Apollo group, approximately 1.3 kilometers (0.81 miles) in diameter. It once had the highest known probability of impacting Earth. In 2002, it had the highest Palermo scale rating with a value of 0.17 and a probability of 1 in 306 (0.33%) for a possible collision in 2880. Since that time, the estimated risk has been updated several times. In December 2015, the odds of an Earth impact were revised to 1 in 8,300 (0.012%) with a Palermo scale rating of −1.42. As of October 2025, it is listed on the Sentry Risk Table with the highest cumulative Palermo scale rating of −0.98. 1950 DA is not assigned a Torino scale rating, because the 2880 date is over 100 years in the future. As of 21 October 2026, the odds of an Earth impact are 1 in 3,000 (0.033%).

== Discovery and nomenclature ==
1950 DA was first discovered on 23 February 1950 by Carl A. Wirtanen at Lick Observatory. It was observed for seventeen days and then lost because this short observation arc resulted in large uncertainties in Wirtanen's orbital solution. On 31 December 2000, it was recovered at Lowell Observatory and was announced as 2000 YK_{66} on 4 January 2001. Just two hours later it was recognized as 1950 DA.

== Observations ==
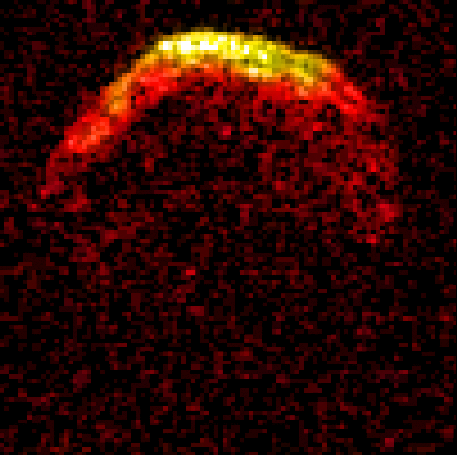
Asteroid 1950 DA, Arecibo Observatory radar image (coloured version)

Arecibo radar movie of 1950 DA obtained during 48 minutes (37% of a rotation) on 4 March 2001

On 5 March 2001, 1950 DA made a close approach to Earth at a distance of 0.05207 AU (7.790 million km; 4.840 million mi; 20.26 LD). It was studied by radar at the Goldstone and Arecibo observatories from March 3 to 7, 2001.

The studies showed that the asteroid has a mean diameter of 1.1 km, assuming that 1950 DA is a retrograde rotator. Optical lightcurve analysis by Lenka Šarounová and Petr Pravec shows that its rotation period is 2.1216±0.0001 hours. Due to its short rotation period and high radar albedo, 1950 DA is thought to be fairly dense (more than 3.5 g/cm^{3}, assuming that it has no internal strength) and likely composed of nickel–iron. In August 2014, scientists from the University of Tennessee determined that 1950 DA is a rubble pile rotating faster than the breakup limit for its density, implying the asteroid is held together by van der Waals forces rather than gravity.

1950 DA made distant approaches to Earth on 20 May 2012, 5 February 2021 and 5 February 2023. However, at these times it was a quarter to half an AU away from Earth, preventing more useful astrometrics and timing that occurs when an object is closer to Earth. The next close approach that presents a good opportunity to observe the asteroid will be on 2 March 2032, when it will be 0.076 AU (11.4 million km) from Earth. The following table lists the approaches closer than 0.1 AU until the year 2500. By 2136 the close approach solutions are becoming notably more divergent.

Position uncertainty and increasing divergence
Date	JPL SBDB nominal geocentric distance (AU)	uncertainty region (1-sigma)
2 March 2032	0.075752 AU (11,332,300 km)	±10 km
19 March 2074	0.095459 AU (14,280,500 km)	±30 km
10 March 2105	0.036316 AU (5,432,800 km)	±43 km
11 March 2136	0.042596 AU (6,372,300 km)	±387 km
8 March 2187	0.035224 AU (5,269,400 km)	±1717 km
20 March 2218	0.084849 AU (12,693,200 km)	±8712 km
18 March 2373	0.058991 AU (8,824,900 km)	±2508 km
6 March 2455	0.087706 AU (13,120,600 km)	±1650 km

Impact probability at different times
Date	JPL Solution	Impact probability
5 April 2002		1/306
7 December 2015		1/8300
29 March 2022		1/34000
18 June 2024		1/2600
23 January 2025	JPL276	1/2600
21 October 2026	JPL284	1/3000

== Possible Earth impact ==
1950 DA has one of the best-determined asteroid orbital solutions. This is due to a combination of:

- an orbit moderately inclined (12 degrees) to the ecliptic plane (reducing in-plane perturbations);
- high-precision radar astrometry, which provides its distance and is complementary to the measurements of angular positions;
- a 74-year observation arc;
- an uncertainty region controlled by resonance.

Main-belt asteroid 78 Diana (~125 km in diameter) will pass about 0.003 AU (450,000 km; 280,000 mi) from 1950 DA on 5 August 2150. At that distance and size, Diana will perturb 1950 DA enough so that the change in trajectory is notable by 2880 (730 years later). In addition, over the intervening time, 1950 DA's rotation will cause its orbit to slightly change as a result of the Yarkovsky effect. If 1950 DA continues on its present orbit, it may approach Earth on 16 March 2880, though the mean trajectory passes many millions of kilometres from Earth, so 1950 DA does not have a significant chance of impacting Earth. As of October 2026, according to the latest solution dated 21 September 2026, the probability of an impact in 2880 is 1 in 3,000 (0.033%).

The energy released by a collision with an object the size of 1950 DA would cause major effects on the climate and biosphere, which would be devastating to human civilization. The discovery of the potential impact heightened interest in asteroid deflection strategies.

== See also ==
- List of exceptional asteroids § Landmark asteroids
- Asteroid impact prediction
- Earth-grazing fireball
- List of asteroid close approaches to Earth
