= 2014 ES57 =

Previously risk–listed Jupiter trojan

2014 ES_{57}
Discovery
- Discovered by: DES-DECam
- Discovery site: Cerro Tololo Obs.
- Discovery date: 2 March 2014

Designations
- Minor planet category: Jupiter trojan Greek

Orbital characteristics
- Epoch 1 July 2021 (JD 2459396.5)
- Uncertainty parameter 0
- Observation arc: 12.05 yr (4,402 d)
- Earliest precovery date: 22 September 2009
- Aphelion: 5.73 AU
- Perihelion: 4.80 AU
- Semi-major axis: 5.26 AU
- Eccentricity: 0.0882
- Orbital period (sidereal): 12.07 yr (4,410 d)
- Mean anomaly: 306°
- Mean motion: 0° 4^{m} 53.76^{s} / day
- Inclination: 6.42°
- Longitude of ascending node: 229°
- Argument of perihelion: 203°
- Earth MOID: 3.81 AU
- Jupiter MOID: 0.191 AU
- T_{Jupiter}: 2.980

Physical characteristics
- Mean diameter: 5.6 km (est.) (Note: Given an absolute magnitude (H) of 14.98 and a trojan albedo for a carbonaceous asteroid of 0.057, yields a mean diameter of around 5.6 kilometer or 3 miles.)
- Absolute magnitude (H): 14.98; 14.99

2014 ES_{57} is a Greek camp Jupiter trojan roughly 5.6 kilometers (3 miles) in diameter that was briefly listed on the Sentry Risk Table in April 2021 when JPL transitioned to DE441. Once listed on the Sentry Risk Table additional archived observations were quickly located that confirmed 2014 ES_{57} is a harmless Jupiter trojan that does not get closer to Earth than 3.8 AU (570 million km). Once the new astrometry was verified and published it was removed from the Sentry Risk Table on 4 May 2021.

When 2014 ES_{57} had a short observation arc of 3 days, some orbit solutions suggested it could be a near-Earth object that was discovered when it was near aphelion 7 AU from the Sun. As a result of the possible near-Earth orbit, the Sentry Risk Table listed a non-significant 1:1-billion chance of impacting Earth on 12 October 2059.
