= (721708) 2004 BX159 =

Asteroid

(721708) 2004 BX_{159}
Discovery
- Discovered by: Paranal Obs.
- Discovery site: Paranal Obs.
- Discovery date: 20 January 2004 (discovery: first observation only)

Designations
- Minor planet category: main-belt · (middle)

Orbital characteristics
- Epoch 4 September 2017 (JD 2458000.5)
- Uncertainty parameter 0
- Observation arc: 19.97 yr (7,293 days)
- Earliest precovery date: 14 July 1997
- Aphelion: 2.8997 AU
- Perihelion: 2.1632 AU
- Semi-major axis: 2.5315 AU
- Eccentricity: 0.1455
- Orbital period (sidereal): 4.03 yr (1,471 days)
- Mean anomaly: 355.95°
- Mean motion: 0° 14^{m} 40.92^{s} / day
- Inclination: 4.0931°
- Longitude of ascending node: 159.75°
- Argument of perihelion: 153.29°

Physical characteristics
- Dimensions: 1.2 km (estimate); 1.8 km (est. at 0.10)
- Absolute magnitude (H): 16.9

(721708) 2004 BX_{159} is an asteroid from the central region of the asteroid belt, approximately 1.2 kilometers in diameter. It was first observed at Paranal Observatory in the Atacama desert of Chile on 20 January 2004. 2004 BX_{159} missed the virtual impactor date of 29 August 2009. The asteroid was removed from the Sentry Risk Table in April 2014 as a result of precovery images establishing it is a harmless main belt asteroid.

== Description ==
2004 BX_{159} orbits the Sun in the central main-belt at a distance of 2.2–2.9 AU once every 4.03 years (1,471 days). Its orbit has an eccentricity of 0.15 and an inclination of 4° with respect to the ecliptic.

After discovery, it was thought to be a Mars-crossing asteroid because of its poorly known orbit, and was listed on the Sentry Risk Table as a possible impactor. With an observation arc of 3 days and only 8 observations, perihelion was determined to be 1.5±3 astronomical units (AU).

Precovery observations in archival data of the Canada-France-Hawaii Telescope on Mauna Kea were identified in early 2014, resulting in a dramatic improvement of the orbital accuracy, sufficient to recognize the object as a regular main belt asteroid, not posing any danger to Earth.

The body was subsequently linked by the Minor Planet Center with additional observations reported since 1997. It has now a well-established orbit, observed over decades, with the lowest possible uncertainty of 0.

It is even known that 2004 BX_{159} passed 0.0036 AU (540,000 km; 330,000 mi) from asteroid 3 Juno on 18 September 1961.

== See also ==
- 2010 GZ60
