= Center for Near-Earth Object Studies =

Center for computing asteroid and comet orbits

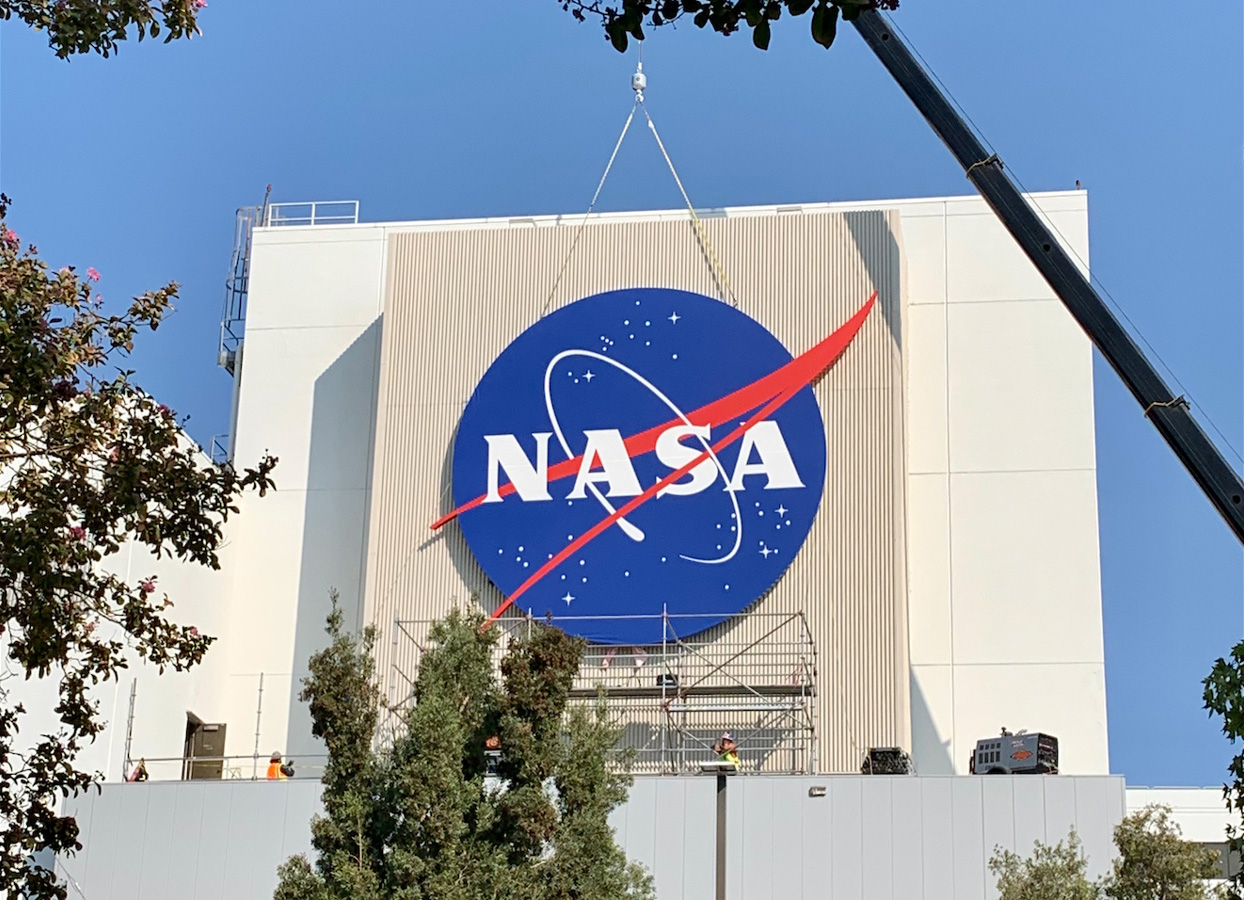
JPL

The Center for Near-Earth Object Studies (CNEOS) is the Jet Propulsion Laboratory's (JPL's) facility for computing asteroid and comet orbits and their probability of Earth impact. CNEOS is located at, and operated by, Caltech in Pasadena, California.

CNEOS computes high-precision orbits for Near-Earth Objects (NEOs). These orbit solutions calculate NEO close approaches to Earth, and produce assessments of NEO impact probabilities over the next century or more.

CNEOS is the home of JPL's Sentry impact monitoring system, which performs analyses of possible future orbits of hazardous asteroids, searching for impact possibilities over the next century. Similarly, its Scout system monitors new potential asteroid discoveries and computes the possible range of future motions. In the event of a potential impact, known as a virtual impactor, the impact time and probability are estimated.

CNEOS also provides the NEO Deflection App, which computes how far a hypothetical asteroid would move if deflected by a known amount at an earlier time.
