= JPL Small-Body Database =

Astronomy database about small Solar System bodies

The JPL Small-Body Database (SBDB) is an astronomy database about small Solar System bodies. It is maintained by the Jet Propulsion Laboratory (JPL) and NASA and provides data for all known asteroids and several comets, including orbital parameters and diagrams, physical diagrams, close approach details, radar astrometry, discovery circumstances, alternate designations and lists of publications related to the small body. The database is updated daily when new observations are available. In April 2021 the JPL Small-Body Database started using planetary ephemeris (DE441) and small-body perturber SB441-N16. Most objects such as asteroids get a two-body solution (Sun+object) recomputed twice a year. Comets generally have their two-body orbits computed at a time near the perihelion passage (closest approach to the Sun) as to have the two-body orbit more reasonably accurate for both before and after perihelion. For most asteroids, the epoch used to define an orbit is updated twice a year. Orbital uncertainties in the JPL Small-Body Database are listed at the 1-sigma level.

On 27 September 2021 the JPL Solar System Dynamics website underwent a significant upgrade.

233000 orbits were computed in August 2021 and in the 12 months to August 2021, more than 3.3 million orbits were computed.

== Orbit viewer ==
In the past, one could view a 3D visualization of the body's orbit using a Java applet. As of mid-2023, one could see something similar using JPL's Orbit Viewer tool, which was implemented using JavaScript, Three.js and WebGL.

The orbit viewer uses unreliable two-body methods, and hence should not be used for accurately determining the time of perihelion passage or planetary encounter circumstances. For accurate ephemerides use the JPL Horizons On-Line Ephemeris System that handles the n-body problem using numerical integration.

== See also ==
- JPL Horizons On-Line Ephemeris System
- Jet Propulsion Laboratory Development Ephemeris
- NEODyS
- Sentry (monitoring system)
