= Sentry (monitoring system) =

JPL program to monitor the Minor Planet Center's catalog for Earth impacts

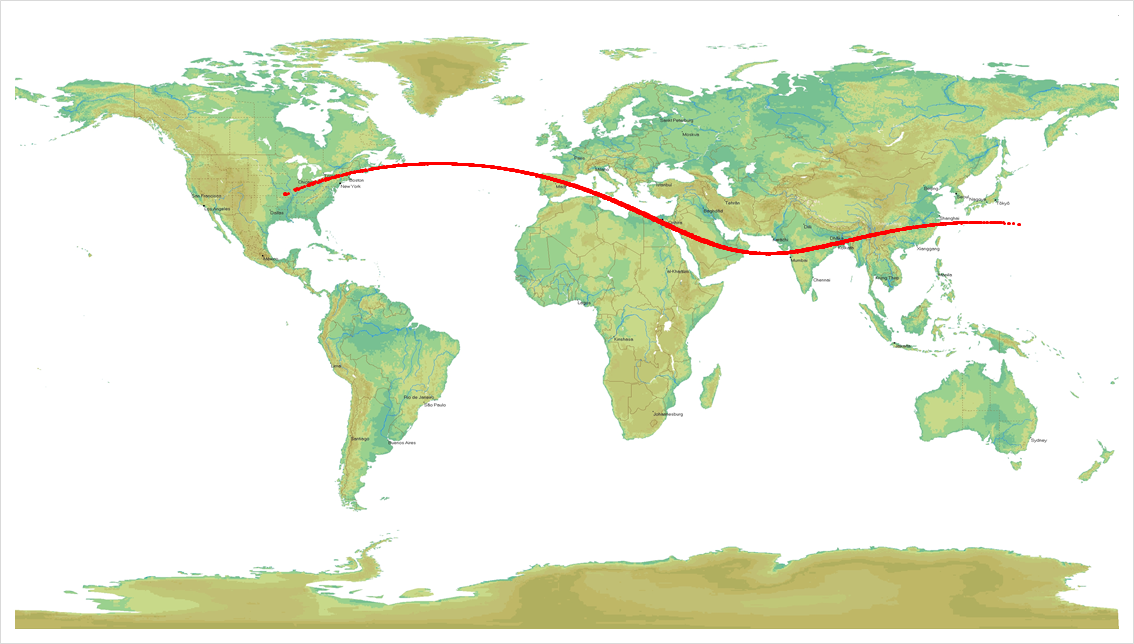
Asteroid 2020 VV risk corridor for the obsolete virtual impactor of 12 October 2033.

Sentry is an automated impact prediction system started in 2002 and operated by the Center for Near Earth Object Studies (CNEOS) at NASA's Jet Propulsion Laboratory. It continually monitors the most up-to-date asteroid catalog for possibilities of future impact with Earth over the next 100+ years. Whenever a potential impact is detected, it will be analyzed and the results immediately published by CNEOS. However, alerts do not imply certainty about future impacts, as the small amounts of optical data that can trigger an alert are not enough to conclusively identify an impact years in the future. In contrast, eliminating an entry on the risk page is a negative prediction (a prediction of where it will not be).

Scientists warn against worrying about the possibility of impact with an object based on only a few weeks of optical data that show a possible Earth encounter years from now. Sometimes, it cannot even be said for certain what side of the Sun such an object will be at the time of the listed virtual impactor date. For example, even though 2005 ED224 had a 1-in-500,000 chance of impacting Earth on 11 March 2023, its most likely position at that date was farther away than the Sun. Most objects in the Sentry Risk Table have an observation arc of less than 14 days, making their positions highly uncertain, and have not been observed for years.

There are 1888 near-Earth asteroids listed in the risk table and 41,848 virtual impact dates, so for each asteroid in the risk table, there is an average of about 22 virtual impact dates. Only about 21 objects in the table are large enough, with a diameter greater than about 140 meters, to be considered potentially hazardous objects. The average size of an object on the default page of Sentry is 120 meters, with an average impact probability of about 1 in 500. More eccentric orbits (such as 2015 RD_{36}) that extend to nearly the orbit of Jupiter can make atmospheric entry at velocities of ~40 km/s (25 mi/s).

== Sentry Risk Table ==
Objects with higher than a 1/500 (0.2%) cumulative probability of impact
Object	Cumulative impact probability	Date of greatest risk	Estimated diameter (meters)	Observation arc (days)
2010 RF12	10%	2095-09-05	7	4374
2020 CD3	2.5%	2082-09-09	2	742
2006 RH120	1.3%	2044-02-08	4	281
2017 WT_{28}	1.2%	2104-11-24	8	19
2024 BY_{15}	0.94%	2095-03-19	15	49
2020 VW	0.70%	2074-11-02	7	14
2006 JY26	0.50%	2074-05-03	7	3
2020 CQ_{1}	0.46%	2070-02-03	6	29
2022 SX_{55}	0.40%	2035-09-17	3	1
2022 NX1	0.32%	2075-12-03	8	142
2000 SG344	0.27%	2071-09-16	37	507
2020 VV	0.23%	2056-10-11	12	61
2017 LD	0.22%	2079-06-10	11	45
2000 LG_{6}	0.21%	2094-05-27	5	2

The Impact Risk page lists a number of lost minor planets that are, for all practical purposes, permanent residents of the risk page; their removal may depend upon a serendipitous rediscovery. Lost asteroid 1979 XB has been on the list since the list's inception. 2007 FT3 and 2014 MV67 with their very short 1-day observation arcs have missed virtual impactor dates as they were likely quite distant from the Earth at the time. 1997 XR2 was serendipitously rediscovered in 2006 after being lost for more than 8 years. 2004 BX159 was determined to be a harmless main belt asteroid in 2014. Some objects on the Sentry Risk Table, such as 2000 SG344, might even be artificial.

2010 RF12 is the asteroid with greatest probability (10%) of impacting Earth, but is only ~7 meters in diameter. The only numbered objects with observation arcs of several years are (29075) 1950 DA and 101955 Bennu. Notable asteroids removed from Sentry include (most recently removed listed first): 99942 Apophis, (410777) 2009 FD, 2006 QV89, 2017 XO2, 1994 WR12, 2007 VK184, (454101) 2013 BP73, 2008 CK70, 2013 TV135, (471240) 2011 BT15, 367943 Duende, and (367789) 2011 AG5.

As of February 2025, of the 191 asteroids with better than a 1-in-10,000 chance of impacting Earth, only (29075) 1950 DA and 101955 Bennu are larger than 50 meters in diameter.

As of March 2025, the soonest virtual impactor of an asteroid larger than 50 meters in diameter with a better than 1:1-million chance of impact is 2022 PX1 on 11 August 2040 with a 1:310000 chance of impact. It is estimated to be 120-meters in diameter, has a short observation arc of 7-days, and is expected to be approximately 1.75 AU (262 million km) from Earth on 11 August 2040. The impact scenario is outside the 3-sigma uncertainty region of ± 242 million km.

The asteroid with the greatest chance of impacting Earth in 2025 is 2009 VA (6-meters in diameter) with less than a 1-day observation arc. It had a 1:48,000 chance of impact on 06 November 2023, but was expected to be around 0.3 AU (45 million km) from Earth on that date with uncertainty region of ± 900 million km.

With a 24-day observation arc, 2017 SA_{20} has the most virtual impactors with 1244 virtual impactor dates.

The diameter of most near-Earth asteroids that have not been studied by radar or infrared can generally only be estimated within about a factor of 2 based on the asteroid's absolute magnitude (H). Their mass, consequently, is uncertain by about a factor of 10. For near-Earth asteroids without a well-determined diameter, Sentry assumes a generic albedo of 0.15.

In August 2013, the Sentry Risk Table started using planetary ephemeris (DE431) for all NEO orbit determinations. DE431 (JPL small-body perturber ephemeris: SB431-BIG16) better models the gravitational perturbations of the planets and includes the 16 most massive main-belt asteroids. In April 2021, Sentry transitioned to DE441 which removed the very low impact probability of short-arc 2014 MV67 which had been less than 1:1-billion. The switch to DE441 also briefly added in the harmless Jupiter trojan 2014 ES57 with a very low impact probability of about 1:1-billion.

JPL launched major changes to the website in February 2017 and re-directed the classic page on 10 April 2017.

In 2021 JPL launched Sentry-II which handles the Yarkovsky effect that can significantly change a small asteroid's path over decades and centuries. Sentry-II defaults to an impact pseudo-observation (IOBS) analysis technique that runs an extended orbit-determination filter that tries to converge to an impacting solution compatible with the observational data.

== Numbers ==
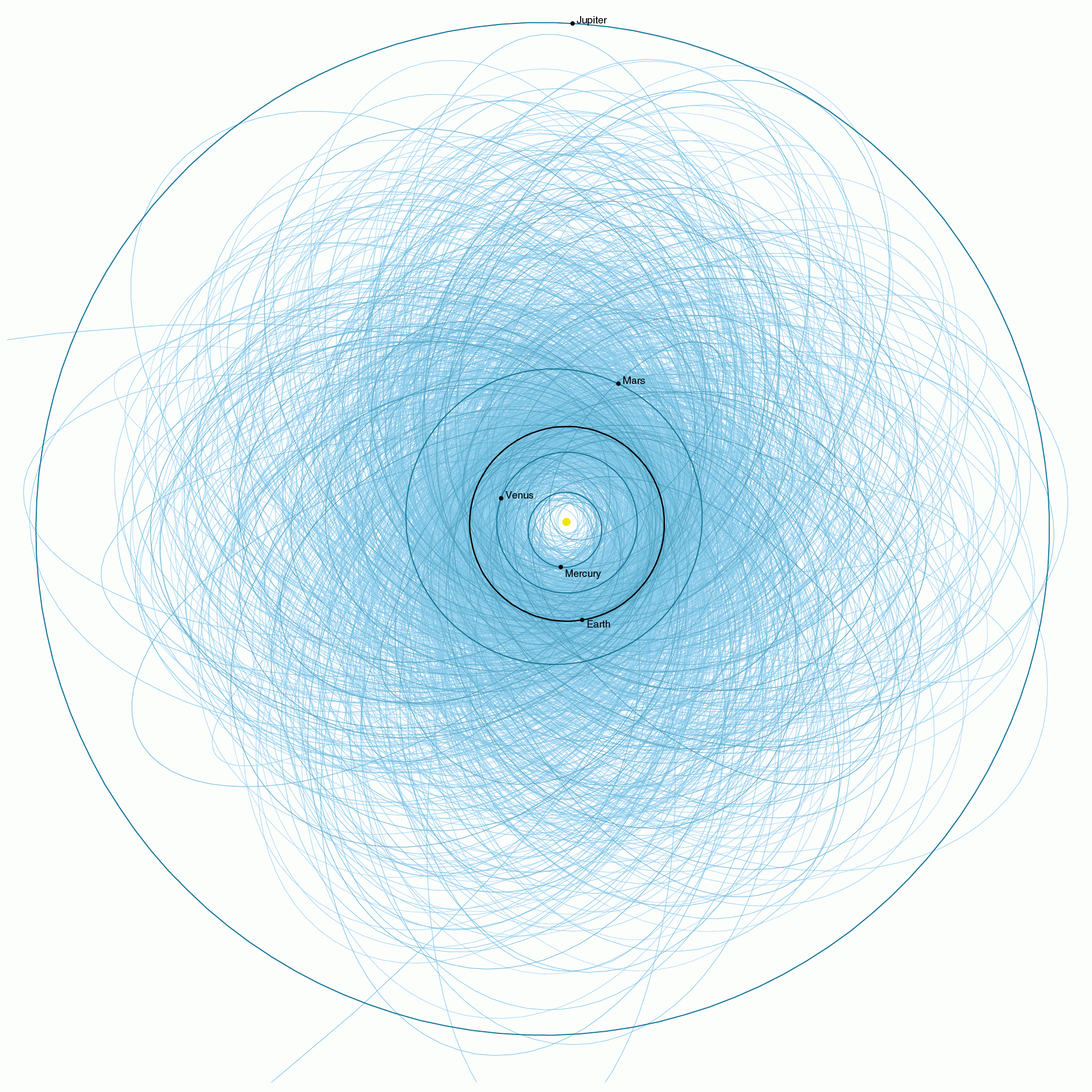
Plot of orbits of known potentially hazardous asteroids

As of February 2025, there are over 37,000 near-Earth objects of which roughly 1,900 near-Earth asteroids are listed on the risk table. Only around 21 objects on the risk table are large enough to qualify as potentially hazardous objects with a diameter greater than 140 meters (absolute magnitude brighter than 22). About 99% of the objects on the risk table are less than roughly 140 meters in diameter. Roughly 1400 of these risk-listed near-Earth asteroids are estimated to be about the size of the Chelyabinsk meteor or smaller (H>26), which killed no one but had 1,491 indirect injuries. More than 3,300 asteroids have been removed from the risk table since it launched in 2002.

The only two comets that briefly appeared on the Sentry Risk Table are 197P/LINEAR (2003 KV2) and 300P/Catalina (2005 JQ5).

== JPL SBDB comparison ==
The JPL Small-Body Database close approach table lists a linearized uncertainty. Sentry computations explore alternate orbit solutions along the line of variations and account for orbit propagation nonlinearities.

== Scout ==
Sentry's "little brother" Scout scans recently detected objects on the Minor Planet Center's Near-Earth Object Confirmation Page with designations that are user-assigned and unofficial as they have not been confirmed by additional observations. The impact risk assessment is rated on a scale of 0–4 (negligible, small, modest, moderate, or elevated). (Note: "Negligible" (0) is for objects where no impacting solution was identified. "Small" (1) is for objects with a <0.1% chance of impact. "Modest" (2) is for a 0.1-1% chance. "Moderate" (3) is for a 1-10% chance, and "Elevated" (4) is for a >10% chance of impact.) Scout is used to help identify imminent impactors. ESA's equivalent to Scout is Meerkat Asteroid Guard.

== See also ==
- Asteroid impact prediction
- Earth-grazing fireball
- Impact event
- List of asteroid close approaches to Earth
- List of Earth-crossing asteroids
- Meteoroid
- NEODyS – Database of near earth asteroid orbits
- Time-domain astronomy
