= Palermo scale =

Logarithmic scale in astronomy

The Palermo scale or Palermo technical impact hazard scale is a logarithmic scale used by astronomers to rate the potential hazard of impact of a near-Earth object (NEO). It combines two types of data—probability of impact and estimated kinetic yield—into a single "hazard" value. A rating of 0 means the hazard is equivalent to the background hazard (defined as the average risk posed by objects of the same size or larger over the years until the date of the potential impact). A rating of +2 would indicate the hazard is 100 times as great as a random background event. Scale values less than −2 reflect events for which there are no likely consequences, while Palermo scale values between −2 and 0 indicate situations that merit careful monitoring. A similar but less complex scale is the Torino scale, which is used for simpler descriptions in the non-scientific media.

As of 2 April 2026, no asteroid has a cumulative rating for impacts above 0, and only two asteroids—(29075) 1950 DA and 101955 Bennu—have ratings between −2 and 0. Historically, three asteroids had ratings above 0 and half a dozen more above −1, but most were downrated since.

== Scale ==
The Palermo scale was devised for astronomers to compare impact hazards at a technical level, rather than for the general public. It was adopted at the meeting of the Working Group on Near-Earth Objects of the Scientific and Technical Subcommittee of the United Nations Committee on the Peaceful Uses of Outer Space which was held in Palermo, Italy, on 11–16 June 2001.

The scale compares the likelihood of the detected potential impact with the average risk posed by objects of the same size or larger over the years until the date of the potential impact. This average risk from random impacts is known as the background risk. The Palermo scale value, $P$, is defined by the equation:

$$P \equiv \log_{10} \frac {p_i} {f_B T}$$

where

- $p_i$ is the impact probability
- $T$ is the time interval until the potential impact that is considered
- $f_B$ is the background impact frequency

The background impact frequency is defined for this purpose as:

$$f_B = 0.03\, E^{-\frac45} \text{ yr}^{-1}\;$$

where the energy threshold $E$ is measured in megatons, and yr is the unit of $T$ divided by one year.

For instance, this formula implies that the expected value of the time from now until the next impact greater than 1 megaton is 33 years, and that when it occurs, there is a 50% chance that it will be above 2.4 megatonnes. This formula is only valid over a certain range of $E$.

However, another paper published in 2002 – the same year as the paper on which the Palermo scale is based – found a power law with different constants:

$$f_B = 0.00737 E^{-0.9} \;$$

This formula gives considerably lower rates for a given $E$. For instance, it gives the rate for bolides of 10 megatonnes or more (like the Tunguska explosion) as 1 per thousand years, rather than 1 per 210 years (or a 38% probability that it happens at least once in a century) as in the Palermo formula. However, the authors give a rather large uncertainty (once in 400 to 1800 years for 10 megatonnes), due in part to uncertainties in determining the energies of the atmospheric impacts that they used in their determination.

Palermo Background Risk Chart
Energy (MT)	Probability				
Energy (MT)	Once in this many years	At least once in one...			
Energy (MT)	Once in this many years	decade	century	millennium	million years
0.1	5.28	87.73%	>99.99%	>99.99%	>99.99%
1	33.3	26.26%	95.24%	>99.99%	>99.99%
10	210	4.65%	37.91%	99.15%	>99.99%
100	1,327	0.75%	7.26%	52.94%	>99.99%
1,000	8,373	0.12%	1.19%	11.26%	>99.99%
10,000	52,830	0.019%	0.19%	1.88%	>99.99%
100,000	333,333	0.003%	0.03%	0.3%	95.02%
1,000,000	2,103,191	0.00048%	0.0048%	0.048%	37.84%
10,000,000	13,270,239	0.000075%	0.00075%	0.0075%	7.26%
100,000,000	83,729,548	0.000012%	0.00012%	0.0012%	1.19%
1,000,000,000	528,297,731	0.0000019%	0.000019%	0.00019%	0.19%
$E$	$\frac{1}{f_B}=\frac{100}{3}E^{0.8}$	$1-\left(1-f_B\right)^{10}$	$1-\left(1-f_B\right)^{100}$	$1-\left(1-f_B\right)^{1,000}$	$1-\left(1-f_B\right)^{1,000,000}$

For asteroids with multiple ($n$) potential impacts, the cumulative Palermo scale rating, $P_{cum}$, is the rating that can be calculated with the sum of the probability ratios of the individual potential impacts (each calculated with a $p_i$ probability and a $T_i$ time until potential impact), which can also be expressed as the logarithm of the sum of 10 raised to the $P_i$ Palermo scale rating of the individual potential impacts:

$$P_{cum} = \log_{10} \sum_{i=1}^{n} \frac {{p_i}} {f_B T_i} = log_{10}{\left(\sum_{i=1}^{n} 10^{P_i}\right)}$$

== Risk calculation ==
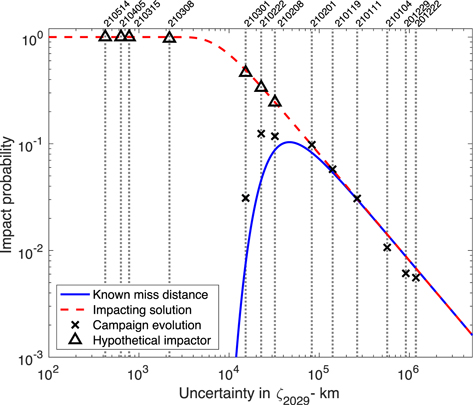
Top: example of the shrinking and changing position of the 3-sigma uncertainty region relative to Earth in the B-plane
Bottom: theoretical (blue and dashed red) and observational (crosses and triangles) evolution of impact probability as a function of uncertainty in the close approach distance for a bypass and an impact case, based on a planetary defense exercise using adapted real observations of 99942 Apophis

For NASA, a unit of the Jet Propulsion Laboratory (JPL), the Center for Near-Earth Object Studies (CNEOS) calculates impact risks and assigns ratings in its Sentry Risk Table, while another unit of JPL, Solar System Dynamics (SSD) provides orbital and close approach data. For ESA, similar services are provided by its Near-Earth Object Coordination Centre (NEOCC), which maintains its own Risk List and Close Approaches List.

The basis for the risk evaluation is the most recent orbit calculation based on all known reliable observations. Along the calculated orbit, close approaches with Earth are determined. Due to measurement and model imprecision, the orbit calculation has an uncertainty, which can be quantified for the close approach distance. Assuming a two-dimensional Gaussian probability distribution in the plane perpendicular to the asteroid's orbit (the B-plane), the uncertainty can be characterised by the standard deviation (sigma) the close approach point in the directions along the asteroid's orbit and perpendicular to it, where the former is usually much larger. The one-sigma margin, which is used by ESA NEOCC one-sigma, means that the close approach point is within those bounds with a 68.3% probability, while the 3-sigma margin, used by NASA JPL SSD, corresponds to 99.7% probability. The probability of an impact is the integral of the probability distribution over the cross section of Earth in the B-plane.

When the close approach of a newly discovered asteroid is first put on a risk list with a significant risk, it is normal for the risk to first increase, regardless whether the potential impact will eventually be ruled out or confirmed with the help of additional observations. After discovery, Earth will be close to the center of the probability distribution, that is, the 3-sigma uncertainty margin will be much bigger than the nominal close encounter distance. With additional observations, the uncertainty will decrease, thus the 3-sigma uncertainty region will shrink, thus Earth will initially cover an increasing part of the probability distribution, resulting in increased risk, and an increasing rating. If the real orbit bypasses Earth, with further observations, Earth will only intersect the tail of the probability distribution (the 3-sigma region will shrink to exclude the Earth) and the impact risk will fall towards zero; while in case the asteroid will hit the Earth, the probability distribution will contract towards its intersection (the 3-sigma region will shrink into Earth's intersection in the B-plane) and the risk will rise towards 100%.

== Asteroids with high ratings ==
In 2002 the near-Earth asteroid (89959) 2002 NT7 reached a positive rating of 0.18 on the Palermo scale, indicating a higher-than-background threat. The value was subsequently lowered after more measurements were taken. 2002 NT_{7} is no longer considered to pose any risk and was removed from the Sentry Risk Table on 1 August 2002.

In September 2002, the highest Palermo rating was that of asteroid (29075) 1950 DA, with a value of 0.17 for a possible collision in the year 2880. By March 2022, the rating had been reduced to −2.0. In May 2024, a study that incorporated observations by the astrometry space observatory Gaia increased the impact risk, consequently, the rating was raised above −1 again.

For a brief period in late December 2004, with an observation arc of 190 days, asteroid 99942 Apophis (then known only by its provisional designation 2004 MN_{4}) held the record for the highest Palermo scale value, with a value of 1.10 for a possible collision in the year 2029. The 1.10 value indicated that a collision with this object was considered to be almost 12.6 times as likely as a random background event: 1 in 37 instead of 1 in 472. With further observations, the risk of impact during later close approaches was completely eliminated and Apophis was removed from the Sentry Risk Table in February 2021.

== See also ==
- Asteroid impact avoidance
- Asteroid impact prediction
- Earth-grazing fireball
- Impact event
- List of asteroid close approaches to Earth
- List of Earth-crossing asteroids
- Time-domain astronomy
