= NEODyS =

Database of near earth asteroid orbits

NEODyS (Near Earth Objects Dynamic Site) is an Italian service that provides information on near-Earth objects with a Web-based interface. It is based on a continually and (almost) automatically maintained database of near earth asteroid orbits. This site provides a number of services to the NEO community. The main service is an impact monitoring system (CLOMON2) of all near-Earth asteroids covering a period until the year 2100.

== Services ==
- Risk Page: One of the most important services is the production of a Risk Page where 1128 NEOs with probabilities of hitting the Earth greater of 10^{−11} from now until 2100 are shown in a Risk list. In the table of the Risk list the NEOs are divided into "Special", as it is the case of 101955 Bennu; "Observable", objects which are presently observable and which critically need a follow-up in order to improve their orbit; "Possible recovery", objects which are not visible at present, but which are possible to recover in the near future; "Lost", objects which have an absolute magnitude (H) brighter than 25 but which are virtually lost, being their orbit too uncertain; and "Small", objects with an absolute magnitude fainter than 25 and, even if they are "lost", they are considered too small to result in heavy damage on the ground. Each object has its own Impactor Table (IT) which shows many parameters useful to determine the risk assessment. As of September 2019, 551 of the risk-listed asteroids are considered too small (H > 25 and less than ~35 meters in diameter) to result in heavy damage on the ground.
- Ephemerides: It provides ephemerides of the object, that is position on sky, V magnitude, altitude, airmass, solar and lunar elongation, phase angle, galactic coordinates, R distance to the Sun, delta distance to the Earth, motion on sky, and the uncertainty on sky.
- Observation prediction: It provides the position of the object at a specific time, information useful for the observer and a graph showing the uncertainty on sky.
- Orbital Information: It provides the dynamical parameters of the orbit of the object.
- MOID: It shows the analysis of the Minimum Orbital Intersection Distance (MOID) of the object.
- Proper elements: It shows the secular properties of the object.
- Observational Information: It provides data of both optical and radar observations and their statistical performance.
- Close approaches: It provides a table with all the close approaches until 2100 with the planets of the Solar System.
- Search: It provides the possibility of queries in the database according to the orbital parameters or the observational conditions or the close approaches with the planets of the Solar System.
- Observatories: It is possible to access the information regarding observatories and their performances.
- Other services: Physical Information provided by ESA's NEO Coordination Centre; Orbit animation provided by the NEO Program Office at the Jet Propulsion Laboratory

== How NEODyS works ==
NEODyS is based on a Postgresql database running on a Linux system.

The database of orbits is continually and automatically maintained with the most recent Minor Planet Center observations. The orbits are computed with the OrbFit software package provided by the OrbFit Consortium. All of the computational services provided by this site can also be done with this software package.

== Future expansion of NEODyS ==
NEODyS is continually expanding and improving. The following are the next tasks of the project:

- Uncertainties of all the quantities provided with the orbit, e.g., MOID and absolute magnitude
- Variable time span for impact monitoring, based upon orbit uncertainty
- Inclusion of non-gravitational perturbations in the dynamic model

== Major update ==
On February 5, 2009 NEODyS went through a major update of the system. A new web-interface is available running the free software PHP. This allows a more flexible and easy to update system. In the same period the system switched to the new version of the Fortran 95 code OrbFit 4.0.

Since 2011 NEODyS is operated and maintained for the European Space Agency by the University of Pisa spin-off SpaceDyS, based in Navacchio near Pisa. SpaceDyS provides data and scientific consultancy to the European Space Agency NEO Coordination Centre based in ESRIN, Frascati, Italy.

== The NEODyS team ==
The NEODyS team is composed by Fabrizio Bernardi (SpaceDyS, Italy), Andrea Chessa (SpaceDyS, Italy), Alessio Del Vigna (SpaceDyS, Italy), Linda Dimare (SpaceDyS, Italy), Davide Bracali Cioci (SpaceDyS, Italy), Giovanni F. Gronchi(University of Pisa, Italy), Giacomo Tommei (University of Pisa, Italy) and Giovanni B. Valsecchi (IASF-INAF, Rome, Italy). Pisa, Italy). The NEODyS founder was Andrea Milani (Dep. of mathematics, University of Pisa, Italy), Steve Chesley (Jet Propulsion Laboratory, USA) and María Eugenia San Saturio Lapeña (E.T.S. de Ingenieros Industriales, University of Valladolid, Spain).

== See also ==
- List of near-Earth object observation projects
