= 1537 Transylvania =

Main-belt asteroid

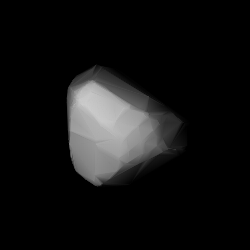
- A lightcurve-derived shape model of Transylvania

Discovery
- Discovered by: G. Strommer
- Discovery site: Konkoly Obs.
- Discovery date: 27 August 1940

Designations
- Named after: Transylvania (region in Romania)
- Alternative designations: 1940 QA · 1940 QN; A903 VB
- Minor planet category: main-belt · (outer)

Orbital characteristics
- Epoch 4 September 2017 (JD 2458000.5)
- Uncertainty parameter 0
- Observation arc: 113.42 yr (41,428 days)
- Aphelion: 3.9677 AU
- Perihelion: 2.1361 AU
- Semi-major axis: 3.0519 AU
- Eccentricity: 0.3001
- Orbital period (sidereal): 5.33 yr (1,947 days)
- Mean anomaly: 143.95°
- Mean motion: 0° 11^{m} 5.64^{s} / day
- Inclination: 3.8591°
- Longitude of ascending node: 230.07°
- Argument of perihelion: 148.20°

Physical characteristics
- Dimensions: 13.60 km (derived); 13.77±1.5 km 17.48±1.16 km 20.288±0.256 km 20.29±0.26 km 21.49±1.58 km
- Synodic rotation period: 12 h
- Geometric albedo: 0.05±0.00; 0.052±0.006; 0.067±0.010; 0.1047 (derived); 0.1619±0.041
- Spectral type: C
- Absolute magnitude (H): 11.90 · 12.12±0.49 · 12.30 · 12.32 · 12.4

1537 Transylvania (provisional designation 1940 QA) is a carbonaceous asteroid and long-lost minor planet from the outer regions of the asteroid belt, approximately 17 kilometers in diameter. Discovered by Gyula Strommer in 1940, it was later named after region of Transylvania, where the discoverer was born.

== Discovery and rediscovery ==
Transylvania was discovered on 27 August 1940, by Hungarian astronomer Gyula Strommer at the Konkoly Observatory near Budapest, Hungary. Observations of the asteroid continued at Konkoly until February 1942. It became a lost minor planet until Spring 1981, when astronomer Leif Kahl Kristensen at the University of Aarhus rediscovered it based on contemporary observations at Palomar Observatory.

Kristensen was able to show that Transylvania was first observed as A903 VB at Heidelberg Observatory in October 1903, and, after its observations at Konkoly in the early 1940s, it was again observed at Goethe Link Observatory in December 1962, and at Palomar in February 1981.

=== Remaining lost minor planets ===
At the same time, Kristensen also rediscovered 452 Hamiltonia. With these two rediscoveries in 1981, only nine numbered minor planets remained unobserved since their discoveries: 330 Adalberta, 473 Nolli, 719 Albert, 724 Hapag, 843 Nicolaia, 878 Mildred, 1009 Sirene, 1026 Ingrid, and 1179 Mally.

== Orbit and classification ==
Transylvania is a non-family asteroid of the main belt's background population. It orbits the Sun in the outer main-belt at a distance of 2.1–4.0 AU once every 5 years and 4 months (1,947 days). Its orbit has an eccentricity of 0.30 and an inclination of 4° with respect to the ecliptic.

== Physical characteristics ==
Transylvania has been characterized as a carbonaceous C-type asteroid by PanSTARRS photometric survey.

=== Rotation period ===
In September 2004, a rotational lightcurve of Transylvania was obtained from photometric observations by French amateur astronomer Laurent Bernasconi. Analysis of the fragmentary lightcurve gave a rotation period of 12 hours with a brightness amplitude of 0.15 magnitude (U=1). As of 2017, no other lightcurve has been obtained, and Transylvania's period is still uncertain.

=== Diameter and albedo ===
According to the surveys carried out by the Infrared Astronomical Satellite IRAS, the Japanese Akari satellite and the NEOWISE mission of NASA's Wide-field Infrared Survey Explorer, Transylvania measures between 13.77 and 21.49 kilometers in diameter and its surface has an albedo between 0.05 and 0.1619.

The Collaborative Asteroid Lightcurve Link derives an albedo of 0.1047 and a diameter of 13.60 kilometers based on an absolute magnitude of 12.4.

== Naming ==
This minor planet was named after the historical region of Transylvania, located in what is now Romania. Formerly, it was part of the Austro-Hungarian Empire. Transylvania is also the birthplace of the discoverer Gyula Strommer (1920–1995). Transylvania was his only minor-planet discovery. The official naming citation was published by the Minor Planet Center on 1 February 1980 (M.P.C. 5182).
