= 452 Hamiltonia =

Main-belt asteroid

Discovery
- Discovered by: James Edward Keeler
- Discovery site: Mount Hamilton
- Discovery date: 6 December 1899

Designations
- Pronunciation: /hæmɪlˈtoʊniə/
- Named after: Mount Hamilton
- Alternative designations: 1899 FD
- Minor planet category: main belt

Orbital characteristics
- Epoch 31 July 2016 (JD 2457600.5)
- Uncertainty parameter 0
- Observation arc: 116.35 yr (42497 d)
- Aphelion: 2.8911284 AU (432.50665 Gm)
- Perihelion: 2.8064929 AU (419.84536 Gm)
- Semi-major axis: 2.8488107 AU (426.17601 Gm)
- Eccentricity: 0.0148545
- Orbital period (sidereal): 4.81 yr (1756.3 d)
- Mean anomaly: 9.4952678°
- Mean motion: 0° 12^{m} 17.923^{s} / day
- Inclination: 3.223518°
- Longitude of ascending node: 92.53125°
- Argument of perihelion: 69.71870°

Physical characteristics
- Synodic rotation period: 2.8813 h (0.12005 d)
- Absolute magnitude (H): 11.9

452 Hamiltonia is an asteroid. It was discovered by James Edward Keeler on 6 December 1899, but was then lost until 1981. Its provisional name was 1899 FD. The asteroid is named for Mount Hamilton, the site of Lick Observatory where Keeler was working when he discovered the asteroid. It was the last asteroid discovery of the 1800s.

L. K. Kristensen at Aarhus University rediscovered 452 Hamiltonia along with 1537 Transylvania along with numerous other small objects in 1981. These rediscoveries left only nine numbered minor planets unobserved since their discoveries: 330 Adalberta (which never existed in the first place), 473 Nolli, 719 Albert, 724 Hapag, 843 Nicolaia, 878 Mildred, 1009 Sirene, 1026 Ingrid, and 1179 Mally. However, by the mid-1980s the only remaining lost asteroids of this group were 719 Albert (rediscovered in 2000), 724 Hapag (rediscovered in 1988), and 878 Mildred (rediscovered in 1991).
