= 1847 Stobbe =

Metallic-carbonaceous main-belt asteroid

Discovery
- Discovered by: H. Thiele
- Discovery site: Bergedorf Obs.
- Discovery date: 1 February 1916

Designations
- Named after: Joachim Stobbe (German astronomer)
- Alternative designations: A916 CA · 1930 ML; 1930 QT · 1937 AH; 1951 MG · 1951 NF; 1952 UC · 1959 LA; 1968 OM_{1} · A902 YB; A906 YN
- Minor planet category: main-belt · (middle)

Orbital characteristics
- Epoch 4 September 2017 (JD 2458000.5)
- Uncertainty parameter 0
- Observation arc: 114.35 yr (41,766 days)
- Aphelion: 2.6658 AU
- Perihelion: 2.5547 AU
- Semi-major axis: 2.6103 AU
- Eccentricity: 0.0213
- Orbital period (sidereal): 4.22 yr (1,540 days)
- Mean anomaly: 280.42°
- Mean motion: 0° 14^{m} 1.32^{s} / day
- Inclination: 11.138°
- Longitude of ascending node: 106.92°
- Argument of perihelion: 140.64°

Physical characteristics
- Dimensions: 17.427±0.335 km 22.72±2.09 km 23.33±0.64 km 23.85 km (derived); 23.90±1.7 km (IRAS:3)
- Synodic rotation period: 5.617±0.002 h 6.37±0.02 h
- Geometric albedo: 0.1128 (derived); 0.113±0.019; 0.1231±0.019 (IRAS:3); 0.136±0.008; 0.232±0.016
- Spectral type: SMASS = Xc · X
- Absolute magnitude (H): 11.0 · 11.1 · 11.15±0.11 · 11.20

1847 Stobbe, provisional designation A916 CA, is an asteroid from the middle region of the asteroid belt, approximately 23 kilometers in diameter.

It was discovered on 1 February 1916, by Danish astronomer Holger Thiele at Bergedorf Observatory in Hamburg, Germany. The asteroid was later named for German astronomer Joachim Stobbe.

== Orbit and classification ==
Stobbe orbits the Sun in the central main-belt at a distance of 2.6–2.7 AU once every 4 years and 3 months (1,540 days). Its orbit has an eccentricity of 0.02 and an inclination of 11° with respect to the ecliptic. The body's observation arc begins with its official discovery observation at Bergedorf. Its first (unused) identification as A902 YB was made at Heidelberg Observatory in 1902.

== Physical characteristics ==
On the SMASS taxonomic scheme, the X-type asteroid is characterized as a Xc-subtype, a group of bodies with intermediary spectra between those typically seen for metallic and carbonaceous bodies.

=== Rotation period ===
In March 2009, a rotational lightcurve of Stobbe was obtained from photometric observations made by French amateur astronomer Pierre Antonini at his Observatoire de Bédoin rendered a well-defined period of 5.617±0.002 hours with a brightness variation of 0.35 in magnitude (U=3), superseding a previous observation at the Roach Motel Observatory (856) in Riverside, California, that gave a period of 6.37±0.02 hours and an amplitude of 0.27 in magnitude (U=2).

=== Diameter and albedo ===
According to the surveys carried out by the Infrared Astronomical Satellite IRAS, the Japanese Akari satellite, and NASA's Wide-field Infrared Survey Explorer with its subsequent NEOWISE mission, the asteroid has an albedo of 0.11–0.14 with a corresponding diameter between 22.7 and 23.9 kilometers.

The Collaborative Asteroid Lightcurve Link agrees with these results and derives an albedo of 0.113 and a diameter of 23.85 kilometers, while a study using preliminary results from NEOWISE diverges significantly from all other observations, giving a diameter of 17.4 kilometers and an albedo of 0.232.

== Naming ==
This minor planet was named in honor of German astronomer and observer of comets and minor planets, Joachim Stobbe (1900–1943). During 1925–1927 he worked at the discovering Hamburg–Bergedorf Observatory and later at the Berlin Observatory, where he observed the rotational lightcurve of the large near-Earth object 433 Eros in detail. During the last few years of his life, he was director of the Poznan Observatory in Poland. The official naming citation was published by the Minor Planet Center on 15 October 1977 (M.P.C. 4236).
