= 797 Montana =

Main-belt asteroid

Discovery
- Discovered by: H. Thiele
- Discovery site: Bergedorf Obs.
- Discovery date: 17 November 1914

Designations
- Pronunciation: /mɒnˈtænə/
- Named after: Bergedorf Observatory; Latin for "mountain village"
- Alternative designations: 1914 VR · 1953 JG; 1957 MG · A898 WA
- Minor planet category: main-belt · (middle)

Orbital characteristics
- Epoch 16 February 2017 (JD 2457800.5)
- Uncertainty parameter 0
- Observation arc: 101.83 yr (37,194 days)
- Aphelion: 2.6904 AU
- Perihelion: 2.3793 AU
- Semi-major axis: 2.5348 AU
- Eccentricity: 0.0614
- Orbital period (sidereal): 4.04 yr (1,474 days)
- Mean anomaly: 277.77°
- Mean motion: 0° 14^{m} 39.12^{s} / day
- Inclination: 4.5102°
- Longitude of ascending node: 238.35°
- Argument of perihelion: 355.40°

Physical characteristics
- Dimensions: 19.20±0.49 km 21.197±0.208; 21.678±0.046 km 21.91±0.41 km 25.41 km (calculated)
- Synodic rotation period: 4.5 h (dated); 4.54619±0.00005 h 4.5462±0.0004 h 4.5463±0.0002 h 4.55±0.01 h
- Geometric albedo: 0.20 (assumed); 0.281±0.012; 0.287±0.045; 0.2878±0.0282; 0.350±0.051
- Spectral type: B–V = 0.887; U–B = 0.505; S (Tholen); S (SMASS)
- Absolute magnitude (H): 10.34 · 10.34±0.28

797 Montana, provisional designation 1914 VR, is a stony asteroid from the middle region of the asteroid belt, approximately 22 kilometers in diameter. It was discovered on 17 November 1914, by Danish astronomer Holger Thiele at Bergedorf Observatory in Hamburg, Germany. It was later named for the discovering observatory.

== Classification and orbit ==
Montana is a stony asteroid that orbits the Sun in the middle main-belt at a distance of 2.4–2.7 AU once every 4.04 years (1,474 days). Its orbit has an eccentricity of 0.06 and an inclination of 5° with respect to the ecliptic. The first identification at Heidelberg dates back to 1898 (A898 WA / 1898 WA), while the asteroid's observation arc begins two months after its discovery with the first used observation made at Bergedorf in 1915.

== Physical characteristics ==
In both the Tholen and SMASS taxonomy, Montana is a common stony S-type asteroid.

=== Rotation period ===
Between 2003 and 2007, three rotational lightcurves of Montana were obtained from photometric observations made by amateur astronomers René Roy, Horacio Correia, Laurent Bernasconi, and Richard Ditteon. All three lightcurves gave a well-defined rotation period of 4.55 hours with a brightness variation between 0.32 and 0.41 magnitude (U=3/3/3).

=== Diameter and albedo ===
According to the space-based surveys carried out by the Japanese Akari satellite and NASA's Wide-field Infrared Survey Explorer with its subsequent NEOWISE mission, Montana's surface has an albedo of 0.28–0.35 and its diameter measures between 19.2 and 21.9 kilometers, while the Collaborative Asteroid Lightcurve Link assumes a standard albedo for stony asteroids of 0.20 and calculates a somewhat larger diameter of 25.4 kilometers, as the lower the albedo, the larger the body's diameter at a constant absolute magnitude.

== Naming ==
This minor planet was named in honor of the Bergedorf Observatory. It was the observatory's first ever made discovery. "Montana" means "mountain village" in Latin and literally translates to "Bergedorf" in German (H 79).
