= Lost minor planet =

Asteroids whose orbits are not known accurately enough to find them again

More than 700,000 minor planets have been observed, many of which must be considered lost due to insufficient observational data.

A minor planet is "lost" when contemporary observers cannot find it, because its location is too uncertain to target observations. This happens if the orbital elements of a minor planet are not known accurately enough, typically because the observation arc for the object is too short, or too few observations were made before the object became unobservable (e.g. too faint due to increasing distance, or too close to the Sun to view at night).

By some definitions thousands, if not tens of thousands, of mostly small observed minor planets are lost. Some lost minor planets discovered in decades past cannot be found because the available observational data is insufficient for reliable orbit determination. With limited information astronomers cannot know where to look for the object at future dates.

Lost objects are sometimes recovered when serendipitously re-observed by a later astronomical survey. If the orbital elements of the newly found object are sufficiently close to those of the earlier lost object, the two may be equated. This can be established by calculating backwards the "new" object's orbit (once it is firmly known) and checking past positions against those previously recorded for the lost object. This usually greatly extends the object's arc length, thus fixing the orbit much more precisely. The back-orbit calculations are especially tricky for lost comets because their orbits can be affected by non-gravitational forces, such as emission of jets of gas from the comet nucleus. Many previously lost asteroids (a type of minor planet) were rediscovered in the 1980s and 1990s, but many minor planets are still lost.

== Overview ==
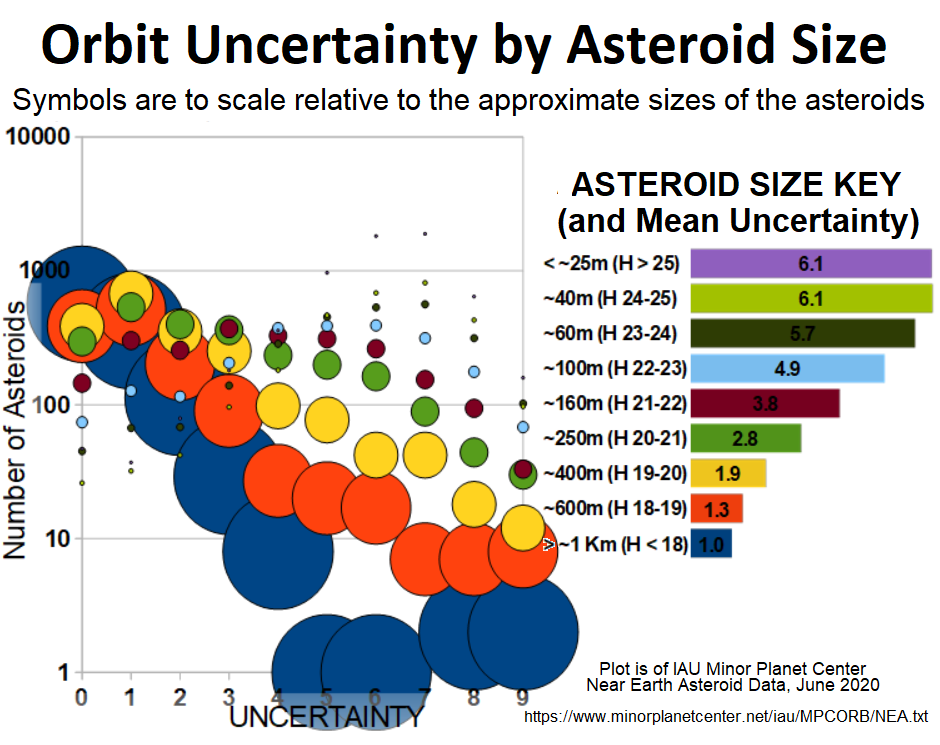
The orbits of kilometre class NEAs are generally well known, though a few have been lost. However, large numbers of smaller NEAs have highly uncertain orbits

This is a small selection of some early lost or notable asteroids with their discovery and rediscovery dates. (A more detailed description for some of these minor planets can be found in the following sections.) There probably were more than 150,000 lost asteroids as of 2002. There were also about 30,000 unnumbered bodies with a condition code of U = 9 as of 2016, indicating the highest possible uncertainty of their orbit determination. Many of these bodies have been observed years if not decades ago and must be considered lost. (Note: Note: this query at JPL's Small-Body Database lists all unnamed asteroids with an orbital uncertainty of 9, which also includes recently discovered bodies. The lost minor planets appear first, since the table is sorted by the body's first observation date.) As of 2016, there were also more than a thousand near-Earth objects (NEOs) with an observation arc of one or two days only.

Designation	Year of		Notes	MPC
Designation	discovery	recovery	Notes	MPC
132 Aethra	1873	1922		
1892 X (330 Adalberta)	1892	false positive (Note: On 18 March 1892, a body discovered by Max Wolf with the provisional designation 1892 X was originally named 330 Adalberta, but was lost and never recovered. In 1982, it was determined that Wolf erroneously measured two images of stars, not asteroids. Because it was a false positive and the body never existed, the named designation 330 Adalberta was reused for another asteroid, A910 CB, discovered in 1910.)		
452 Hamiltonia	1899	1981		
473 Nolli	1901	1987		
12126 Chersidamas (A904 RD)	1904	1999		
719 Albert	1911	2000		
724 Hapag	1911	1988		
843 Nicolaia	1916	1981		
878 Mildred	1916	1991		
1009 Sirene	1923	1982		
1026 Ingrid	1923	1986		
3789 Zhongguo	1928	1986		
1179 Mally	1931	1986		
1862 Apollo	1932	1973		
2101 Adonis	1936	1977		
69230 Hermes	1937	2003		
1537 Transylvania	1940	1981		
1922 Zulu	1949	1974		
(29075) 1950 DA	1950	2000		
1916 Boreas	1953	1976		
6344 P-L	1960	2007	Potentially hazardous object; probably a dormant comet	MPC
3494 Purple Mountain	1962	1980		
7796 Járacimrman	1973	1996		
1927 LA	1927	false positive	Observed 3 times between 1 June 1927 and 5 July 1927	MPC
1991 BA	1991	still lost	Passed within a lunar distance of Earth	MPC
523731 1995 SN55}	1995	2020	3:5 resonant TNO initially thought to be a large centaur	MPC
2007 WD5	2007	still lost	Passed close to Mars	MPC

== 20th-century recoveries ==
The number of asteroids that were only observed once and not re-observed grew throughout the 19th and 20th centuries, but improved telescopes, searches, and detection techniques led to resolution of most of these cases between 1970 and 2000. There are earlier examples also, such as 132 Aethra, which was lost between 1873 and 1922.

=== 1970s ===
Recovered body	Description
1862 Apollo	Apollo is a Q-type asteroid, discovered by Karl Reinmuth in 1932, but lost and not recovered until 1973. Another Apollo asteroid is 2101 Adonis, discovered by Eugene Delporte in 1936 and lost until 1977 when it was rediscovered by Charles T. Kowal. It was also one of the first near-Earth asteroids to be discovered.
1916 Boreas	The Amor asteroid Boreas, provisionally designated 1953 RA, was discovered on 1 September 1953 by Sylvain Julien Victor Arend at the Royal Observatory of Belgium, and rediscovered in 1974 by Richard Eugene McCrosky, G. Schwartz and JH Bulger based on a predicted position by Brian G. Marsden.
1922 Zulu	The outer main-belt asteroid, provisionally designated 1949 HC, was discovered on 25 April 1949 by Ernest Leonard Johnson at Johannesburg (UO). It is one of very few asteroids located in the 2:1 mean-motion resonance with Jupiter. This asteroid was lost shortly after discovery and only rediscovered in 1974 by Richard Eugene McCrosky, Cheng-yuan Shao and JH Bulger based on a predicted position by C. M. Bardwell of the Cincinnati Observatory.

=== 1980s and 1990s ===
Leif Kahl Kristensen at the University of Aarhus rediscovered 452 Hamiltonia and 1537 Transylvania, along with numerous other small objects, in 1981. With the publication of these results, only nine numbered minor planets remained unobserved since their discoveries: 330 Adalberta, 473 Nolli, 719 Albert, 724 Hapag, 843 Nicolaia, 878 Mildred, 1009 Sirene, 1026 Ingrid, and 1179 Mally. All were recovered in the 1980s with the exception of 719 Albert, which was recovered in 2000.

Recovered body	Description
330 Adalberta	The object originally named Adalberta, provisionally designated 1892 X, turned out to be an erroneous observation. The designation was later reassigned to A910 CB, itself an asteroid first discovered in 1910 and seen again briefly in 1937, 1951, 1974, 1978 (twice) and 1980, receiving a new designation on each occasion, before it was recognised in 1982 that all of these observations were of the same object.
843 Nicolaia	Nicolaia, provisionally designated 1916 AN, was rediscovered at the Heidelberg Astronomisches Rechen-Institut in 1981.
473 Nolli	Nolli, provisionally designated 1901 GC, was discovered by Max Wolf on 13 February 1901, but it remained lost for many decades until it was recovered finally in 1987, 86 years later.
724 Hapag	Hapag had first been found by Johann Palisa in 1911. It was given the provisional name 1911 NC, but was lost until it was rediscovered in 1988.
719 Albert	Near-Earth asteroid 719 Albert (1911 MT) had also been found by Johann Palisa in 1911. Due to inaccuracies in its computed orbit, Albert was also lost and not recovered until 2000, when Jeffrey A. Larsen located it using data from the Spacewatch asteroid survey project. At the time of its rediscovery, Albert was the last remaining "lost asteroid" among those assigned numbers (since 69230 Hermes was not numbered until 2003).
878 Mildred	Mildred, provisionally designated 1916 f, was originally discovered in 1916 using the 60-inch Hale telescope at the Californian Mount Wilson Observatory, but was subsequently lost until it was again observed on single nights in 1985 and 1991.
1009 Sirene	Sirene, provisionally designated 1923 PE, was recovered in 1982 by J. Gibson using exposures form the Samuel Oschin Telescope at Palomar Observatory, and he revised its ephemeris.
1026 Ingrid	Ingrid was discovered by Karl Reinmuth on 13 August 1923 and given the provisional designation 1923 NY. It was reidentified in 1986 by Syuichi Nakano.
1179 Mally	Mally was discovered by Max Wolf on 19 March 1931 and given the provisional designation 1931 FD. It was rediscovered in 1986 by Lutz Schmadel, Richard Martin West and Hans-Emil Schuster.

Other notable recoveries

- While studying in Chicago in 1928, Zhang Yuzhe discovered an asteroid that was given the provisional designation 1928 UF, and later the number 1125. He named it "China", or "中華" Zhōnghuá. However, this asteroid was not observed beyond its initial appearance and a precise orbit could not be calculated. In 1957, the Purple Mountain Observatory in China discovered a new asteroid, and with Zhang Yuzhe's agreement the new object 1957 UN_{1} was reassigned the official designation 1125 China in place of the lost 1928 UF. However, in 1986, the newly discovered object 1986 QK_{1} was confirmed to be a rediscovery of the original 1928 UF, and this object was named 3789 Zhongguo, which is also a name for China.
- The near-Earth asteroid (29075) 1950 DA was discovered on 23 February 1950 by Carl Wirtanen at Lick Observatory. It was observed for 17 days and then lost, since not enough observations were made to allow its orbit to be plotted. It was then rediscovered on 31 December 2000. The chance it will impact Earth on 16 March 2880 is about 1 in 4,000, or 0.025 percent.
- 7796 Járacimrman was discovered at the Czech Kleť Observatory on 16 January 1996 by Zdeněk Moravec and was designated 1996 BG. It was observed until April 1996 and then in June and July 1997. It was revealed, by precovery, to be a lost asteroid which had previously been observed twice: at the Brera-Merate Observatory in northern Italy on 12 December 1973 and at the Australian Mount Stromlo Observatory near Canberra, on 8 and 9 July 1990.

== 20th-century discoveries that are still lost ==
Below are some notable asteroids that were discovered during the 20th century and are lost as of 2025.

- 1979 XB: This 660-metre (2,170 ft) near-Earth asteroid was observed 18 times over a period of 3.9 days between 11 and 15 December 1979. As of 11 February 2025, it has the fourth-highest cumulative Palermo scale rating at −2.70, for possible impacts on Earth during four close approaches in 2056, 2086, 2102 and 2113. Due to the large uncertainty in its orbital parameters, the odds of the most likely impact in 2056 is only 1 in 5.3 million.

== 21st century ==
Recently lost minor planets

- 6Q0B44E was discovered orbiting Earth in 2006. Its properties were consistent with being an artificial piece of space debris, so it was not given a minor planet designation. 6Q0B44E was lost in 2007, but another object XL8D89E was discovered on a very similar (but not identical) orbit in 2016. It is likely, though unproven, that both are the same object, which experiences non-gravitational acceleration (such as a slow gas leak) causing slight variations in its orbit. XL8D89E was itself lost in 2018.
- 2007 WD5 is a 50 m (160 ft) Apollo-class NEO and a Mars-crosser discovered on 20 November 2007, by Andrea Boattini of the Catalina Sky Survey. Early observations of 2007 WD_{5} caused excitement amongst the scientific community when it was estimated as having as high as a 1 in 25 chance of colliding with Mars on 30 January 2008. However, by 9 January 2008 additional observations allowed NASA's Near Earth Object Program (NEOP) to reduce the uncertainty region resulting in only a 1-in-10,000 chance of impact. 2007 WD_{5} most likely passed Mars at a distance of 6.5 Mars radii. Due to this relatively small distance and the uncertainty level of the prior observations, the gravitational effects of Mars on its trajectory are unknown and, according to Steven Chesley of NASA's JPL-Near Earth Object program, 2007 WD_{5} is currently considered "lost". The best fit trajectory had the asteroid passing within 21,000 km of Mars and only 16,000 km from its moon Deimos.
- In 2007, the object 2007 RR_{9} was found to be the near-Earth asteroid 6344 P–L, lost since 1960. It is a potentially hazardous object and probably a dormant comet.
- 2020 MK_{53} is a lost trans-Neptunian object discovered on 22 June 2020 and announced on 7 April 2023 (MPS 1836391, MPO 735634) by the New Horizons KBO Search team using the 8.2-meter Subaru Telescope at Mauna Kea Observatory in Hawaii. Its orbit is highly uncertain because it was observed for only three days, which is not long enough to determine an orbit accurately. Its distance from the Sun might be around 160 astronomical units according to orbital calculations, which would make it the farthest known Solar System object from the Sun. However, the uncertainty in its distance from the Sun ranges from ±4 AU to over ±20,000 AU, depending on the method of calculation.

== See also ==
- List of unnumbered minor planets § 1900–1979
- Lost comet
- Precovery
