= 20936 Nemrut Dagi =

Stony Hungaria asteroid and Mars-grazer

Discovery
- Discovered by: C. J. van Houten; I. van Houten-G. T. Gehrels
- Discovery site: Palomar Obs.
- Discovery date: 13 May 1971

Designations
- Named after: Nemrut Dağı (volcano in Turkey)
- Alternative designations: 4835 T-1 · 1953 CP; 1992 SR
- Minor planet category: main-belt · (inner); Hungaria

Orbital characteristics
- Epoch 1 July 2021 (JD 2459396.5)
- Uncertainty parameter 0
- Observation arc: 50.12 yr (18,308 d)
- Aphelion: 2.0419 AU
- Perihelion: 1.6671 AU
- Semi-major axis: 1.8545 AU
- Eccentricity: 0.1011
- Orbital period (sidereal): 2.53 yr (922 d)
- Mean anomaly: 168.55°
- Mean motion: 0° 23^{m} 25.08^{s} / day
- Inclination: 18.599°
- Longitude of ascending node: 26.629°
- Argument of perihelion: 324.45°

Physical characteristics
- Mean diameter: 3.21±0.50 km; 3.51±0.66 km; 3.567±0.189 km
- Synodic rotation period: 3.2754±0.0005 h
- Geometric albedo: 0.31±0.11; 0.43±0.14; 0.460±0.078
- Spectral type: E/S
- Absolute magnitude (H): 14.02

20936 Nemrut Dagi (provisional designation 4835 T-1) is a stony Hungaria asteroid and Mars-grazer from the innermost regions of the asteroid belt, approximately 3.5 kilometers (2.2 miles) in diameter. It was discovered on 13 May 1971, by Dutch astronomer couple Ingrid and Cornelis van Houten at Leiden, on photographic plates taken by Dutch–American astronomer Tom Gehrels at Palomar Observatory in California, United States. The asteroid has a rotation period of 3.28 hours, a likely spheroidal shape, and a high albedo typically seen among the enstatite-rich E-type asteroids. In 2012, it was named after the a dormant volcano Nemrut (Nemrut Dağı) in Turkey.

== Orbit and classification ==
Nemrut Dagi belongs to the dynamical group of Hungaria asteroids, which form the innermost dense concentration of asteroids in the Solar System. It orbits the Sun in the inner main-belt at a distance of 1.7–2.0 AU once every 2 years and 6 months (922 days; semi-major axis of 1.85 AU). Its orbit has an eccentricity of 0.10 and an inclination of 19° with respect to the ecliptic. Nemrut Dagi is also an outer Mars-grazer, as its orbit has a perihelion (1.667 AU) slightly below the aphelion of Mars (1.67 AU), not crossing the Red Planet's osculating orbit. It is classified as an "inner main-belt asteroid" in the JPL's data base, where it would be labelled a Mars-crosser if it had a perihelion of 1.666 AU or less. The asteroid's observation arc begins with its observation as 1953 CP at Palomar Observatory in February 1953, or 18 years prior to its official discovery in 1971.

== Designation ==
=== Survey designation ===
Upon discovery, this minor planet was designated 4835 T-1. The survey designation means that it was the 4835th object discovered in the "T-1" series, which stands for the first Palomar–Leiden Trojan survey, named after the fruitful collaboration of the Palomar and Leiden Observatory in the 1960s and 1970s. Gehrels used Palomar's Samuel Oschin telescope (also known as the 48-inch Schmidt Telescope), and shipped the photographic plates to Ingrid and Cornelis van Houten at Leiden Observatory where astrometry was carried out. The trio are credited with several thousand asteroid discoveries.

=== Naming ===
It was named after the dormant volcano Nemrut (Nemrut Dağı) in Turkey. It is the most western volcano of a group of volcanoes near Lake Van in Eastern Anatolia. The volcano is named after King Nimrod who is said to have ruled this area in about 2100 BC. The asteroid's name was proposed by German astronomer Joachim Schubart, and its official naming citation was published by the Minor Planet Center on 6 April 2012 (M.P.C. 79103).

== Physical characteristics ==
=== Lightcurves ===
In December 2015, a rotational lightcurve of Nemrut Dagi was obtained by American astronomer Brian Warner at his CS3–Palmer Divide Station (U82) in California. Lightcurve analysis gave a well-defined rotation period of 3.2754±0.0005 hours with a low brightness variation of 0.08±0.01 magnitude (U=3), indicating that the body has a rather spheroidal shape.

This result supersedes previous observations. Warner obtained similar periods of 3.233±0.002 and an amplitude of 0.05±0.01 (November 2007, revised), 3.321±0.002 hours and 0.15±0.02 (February 2011), and 5.697±0.002 hours and 0.15±0.02 (November 2007), with a quality code of U=2, 2 and 0, respectively. The asteroid was also observed by American astronomer Brian A. Skiff during the Near-Earth Asteroid Photometric Survey (NEAPS) at Lowell Observatory, who obtained a period of 3.233±0.002 in February 2011, which he directly reported to the LCBD (U=2). (Note: Skiff (2011) web: rotation period 3.293±0.001 hours with a brightness amplitude of 0.06 mag. Summary figures for (20936) Nemrut Dagi at Dagi Collaborative Asteroid Lightcurve Link (CALL)) Additional observations by NEAPS were published in 2019, and gave a concurring period of 3.283±0.007, 3.285±0.004, and 3.274±0.003 (U=2+,2+,2+). In May 2019, observations by Robert Stephens at CS3 (U81) determined a period of 3.328±0.002 (U=2).

=== Diameter and albedo ===
According to the surveys carried out by NASA's Wide-field Infrared Survey Explorer with its subsequent NEOWISE mission, the asteroid has a mean-diameter of 3.21±0.50 km, 3.51±0.66 km, and 3.57±0.19 km with an exceptionally high albedo of 0.31±0.11, 0.43±0.14, and 0.460±0.078, respectively. A high albedo of 0.30 or more is typically seen among the bright E-type asteroids that are thought to be composed of enstatite, a mineral which is rich in Magnesium sulfite (MgS0_{3}). The Collaborative Asteroid Lightcurve Link assumed a standard albedo for a common S-type asteroid of 0.20, and calculates a larger diameter of 5.3 kilometers based on an absolute magnitude of 13.8.
