= James Edward Keeler =

American astronomer (1857–1900)

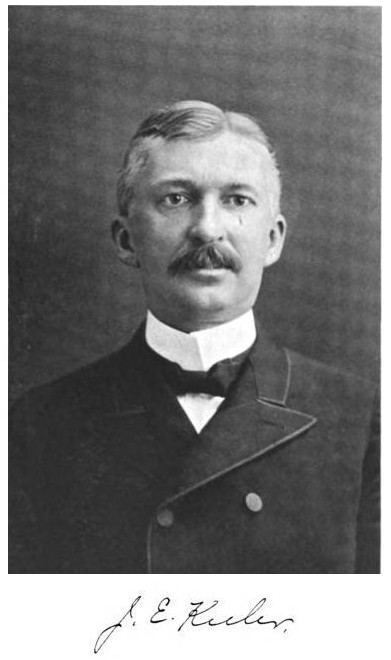
- James Edward Keeler
- Born: September 10, 1857; La Salle, Illinois
- Died: August 12, 1900 (aged 42); San Francisco, California
- Known for: Astrophysical Journal; Rings of Saturn astrophotography
- Awards: Henry Draper Medal (1899)
- Scientific career
- Fields: Astronomy
- Workplaces: Lick Observatory; Allegheny Observatory

James Edward Keeler (September 10, 1857 – August 12, 1900) was an American astronomer. He was an early observer of galaxies using photography, as well as the first to show observationally that the rings of Saturn do not rotate as a solid body.

== Career and personal life ==
Keeler was born in La Salle Illinois, but grew up and spent the majority of his early life in Mayport, Florida near Jacksonville. His mother's father was a former Governor of Connecticut, Henry Dutton.

Keeler worked at Lick Observatory beginning in 1888 but left after being appointed director of the University of Pittsburgh's Allegheny Observatory in 1891. He returned to Lick Observatory as its director in 1898 but died not long after in 1900. Keeler suffered from a heart weakness that went undiagnosed until shortly before his death. On the 12th of August, he died from a sudden stroke. His ashes were interred in a crypt at the base of the 31-inch Keeler Memorial telescope at the Allegheny Observatory.

Along with George Hale, Keeler founded and edited the Astrophysical Journal, which remains a major journal of astronomy today.

His parents were William F. and Anna (née Dutton) Keeler. He had married in 1891 and left a widow and two children.

== Research ==
Keeler was the first to observe the gap in Saturn's rings now known as the Encke Gap, using the 36-inch refractor at Lick Observatory on 7 January 1888. After this feature had been named for Johann Encke, who had observed a much broader variation in the brightness of the A Ring, Keeler's contributions were brought to light. The second major gap in the A Ring, discovered by Voyager, was named the Keeler Gap in his honor.

Minor planets discovered: 2
452 Hamiltonia	December 6, 1899
(20958) A900 MA	June 29, 1900

In 1895, his spectroscopic study of the rings of Saturn revealed that different parts of the rings reflect light with different Doppler shifts, due to their different rates of orbit around Saturn. This was the first observational confirmation of the theory of James Clerk Maxwell that the rings are made up of countless small objects, each orbiting Saturn at its own rate. These observations were made with a spectrograph attached to the 13-inch Fitz-Clark refracting telescope at Allegheny Observatory.

His observations with the Lick Crossley telescope helped establish the importance of large optical reflecting telescopes, and expanded astronomers' understanding of nebulae. After his untimely death, his colleagues at Lick Observatory arranged for the publication of his photographs of nebulae and clusters in a special volume of the Lick Observatory publications.

Keeler discovered two minor planets, the Koronis asteroid 452 Hamiltonia in 1899, and the Mars-crosser asteroid (20958) A900 MA in 1900, which became a lost minor planet until its recovery 99 years later.

After the discovery of pulsars in 1967, optical images of the Crab Nebula taken by Keeler in 1899 were used to determine the proper motion of the Crab Pulsar.

== Honors and legacy ==
Keeler was awarded the Henry Draper Medal from the National Academy of Sciences in 1899. In 1900 he was elected president of the Astronomical Society of the Pacific.

In 1880, Allegheny Observatory director Samuel Pierpont Langley, accompanied by Keeler and others, went on a scientific expedition to the summit of Mount Whitney. The purpose of the expedition was to study how the Sun's radiation was selectively absorbed by the Earth's atmosphere, comparing the results at high altitude with those found at lower levels. As a result of the expedition, a 14,240-ft. peak near Mount Whitney was named the "Keeler Needle".

In addition to the Keeler gap in Saturn's rings, the Martian crater Keeler, the lunar crater Keeler, as well as the asteroid 2261 Keeler, are named in his honor.
