= 984 Gretia =

Main-belt asteroid

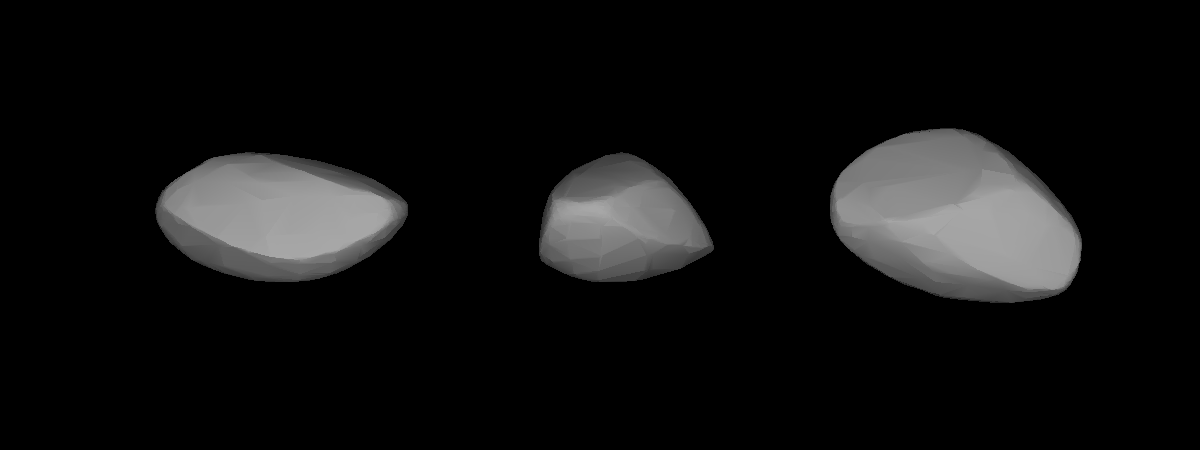
- 3D-model of Gretia based on its lightcurve

Discovery
- Discovered by: K. Reinmuth
- Discovery site: Heidelberg Obs.
- Discovery date: 27 August 1922

Designations
- Pronunciation: /ˈɡriːtiə/
- Named after: Greta, sister-in-law of astronomer Albrecht Kahrstedt
- Alternative designations: 1922 MH · 1973 LC; A910 BA · A915 DA
- Minor planet category: main-belt · (middle) background

Orbital characteristics
- Epoch 4 September 2017 (JD 2458000.5)
- Uncertainty parameter 0
- Observation arc: 94.45 yr (34,499 days)
- Aphelion: 3.3562 AU
- Perihelion: 2.2495 AU
- Semi-major axis: 2.8028 AU
- Eccentricity: 0.1974
- Orbital period (sidereal): 4.69 yr (1,714 days)
- Mean anomaly: 65.271°
- Mean motion: 0° 12^{m} 36^{s} / day
- Inclination: 9.0930°
- Longitude of ascending node: 314.21°
- Argument of perihelion: 55.494°

Physical characteristics
- Dimensions: 31.91±3.1 km 32.449±0.306 km 34.91±0.47 km 36.600±0.187 km
- Synodic rotation period: 5.560±0.018 h 5.76 h 5.778±0.001 h 5.778026±0.000001 h 5.77827±0.00005 h 5.7789±0.0002 h 5.780±0.001 h 5.781 h
- Geometric albedo: 0.3566±0.0863; 0.360±0.012; 0.421±0.038; 0.4239±0.095
- Spectral type: SMASS = Sr · S B–V = 0.950±0.030
- Absolute magnitude (H): 9.03 · 9.52±0.16

984 Gretia /ˈɡriːtiə/ is a stony background asteroid from the central regions of the asteroid belt, approximately 32 kilometers (20 miles) in diameter. It was discovered by German astronomer Karl Reinmuth at the Heidelberg-Königstuhl State Observatory on 27 August 1922 and given the provisional designation 1922 MH. The asteroid was named after Greta, sister-in-law of ARI-astronomer Albrecht Kahrstedt.

== Orbit and classification ==
Gretia is a background asteroid that has not been associated with any known asteroid family. It orbits the Sun in the central main belt at a distance of 2.2–3.4 AU once every 4 years and 8 months (1,714 days). Its orbit has an eccentricity of 0.20 and an inclination of 9° with respect to the ecliptic.

It was first observed as A910 BA at the discovering observatory in 1910, and five years later as A915 DA at the United States Naval Observatory. The body's observation arc begins at Vienna Observatory in September 1922, two weeks after its official discovery observation.

== Naming ==
This minor planet was named after Greta, sister-in-law of Albrecht Kahrstedt (1897–1971), a German astronomer at ARI and director of the institute's Potsdam division, who requested the naming of this asteroid and 1026 Ingrid (daughter of Greta) in a personal letter to the discoverer in February 1926. Kahrstedt himself was honored with the naming of 1587 Kahrstedt.

The official naming citation was mentioned in The Names of the Minor Planets by Paul Herget in 1955 (H 94). Lutz Schmadel quoted an excerpt of Kahrstedt's letter in his Dictionary of Minor Planet Names (LDS).

== Physical characteristics ==
In the SMASS classification, Gretia is a Sr-subtype that transitions between the common S-type and rare R-type asteroids.

=== Lightcurves ===
Since 1997, a large number of rotational lightcurves of Gretia have been obtained from photometric observations. Analysis of the best-rated lightcurves gave a rotation period of 5.778 hours with a maximal brightness amplitude from 0.26 to 0.75 magnitude (U=2–3).

The asteroid's spin axis of (92.0°, 67.0°) and (247.0°, 48.0°) in ecliptic coordinates (λ, β) have also been derived from modeled lightcurves (Q=3).

=== Diameter and albedo ===
According to the surveys carried out by the Infrared Astronomical Satellite IRAS, the Japanese Akari satellite and the NEOWISE mission of NASA's Wide-field Infrared Survey Explorer, Gretia measures between 31.91 and 36.60 kilometers in diameter and its surface has a high albedo between 0.3566 and 0.4239.

The Collaborative Asteroid Lightcurve Link adopts the results obtained by IRAS, that is, an exceptionally high albedo of 0.4239 and a diameter of 31.91 kilometers with an absolute magnitude of 9.03.
