= 3202 Graff =

Carbonaceous main-belt asteroid

Discovery
- Discovered by: M. F. Wolf
- Discovery site: Heidelberg Obs.
- Discovery date: 3 January 1908

Designations
- Named after: Gareth V. Williams (astronomer)
- Alternative designations: A908 AA · 1981 ES_{13}
- Minor planet category: main-belt · Hilda

Orbital characteristics
- Epoch 4 September 2017 (JD 2458000.5)
- Uncertainty parameter 0
- Observation arc: 109.02 yr (39,819 days)
- Aphelion: 4.3883 AU
- Perihelion: 3.4843 AU
- Semi-major axis: 3.9363 AU
- Eccentricity: 0.1148
- Orbital period (sidereal): 7.81 yr (2,853 days)
- Mean anomaly: 295.10°
- Mean motion: 0° 7^{m} 34.32^{s} / day
- Inclination: 11.107°
- Longitude of ascending node: 205.14°
- Argument of perihelion: 268.81°

Physical characteristics
- Dimensions: 35.914±0.244; 36.78 km (calculated)
- Synodic rotation period: 17.32±0.02 h
- Geometric albedo: 0.055±0.013; 0.057 (assumed)
- Spectral type: D · C
- Absolute magnitude (H): 10.9 · 11.31±0.28

3202 Graff, provisional designation A908 AA, is a carbonaceous Hilda asteroid from the outermost region of the asteroid belt, approximately 36 kilometers in diameter. It was discovered on 3 January 1908, by German astronomer Max Wolf at Heidelberg Observatory in southern Germany. The asteroid was named after astronomer Gareth V. Williams.

== Orbit and classification ==
Graff belongs to the Hilda family of asteroids, which are in a 3:2 orbital resonance with the giant planet Jupiter. It orbits the Sun in the outer main-belt at a distance of 3.5–4.4 AU once every 7 years and 10 months (2,853 days). Its orbit has an eccentricity of 0.11 and an inclination of 11° with respect to the ecliptic. The asteroid's observation arc begins 3 weeks after its discovery with its first used observation at Heidelberg.

== Physical characteristics ==
The dark C-type asteroid is classified as a rare D-type by Pan-STARRS' large-scale survey,

In July 2015, a rotational lightcurve of Graff was obtained by astronomer Robert Stephens at the Center for Solar System Studies. It gave a well-defined rotation period of 17.32±0.02 hours with a brightness variation of 0.18 in magnitude (U=3-).

According to the survey carried out by NASA's Wide-field Infrared Survey Explorer with its subsequent NEOWISE mission, Graff measures 35.9 kilometers in diameter and its surface has an albedo of 0.055. The Collaborative Asteroid Lightcurve Link assumes a standard albedo for carbonaceous asteroids of 0.057 and calculates a diameter of 36.8 kilometers with an absolute magnitude of 10.9.

== Naming ==
This minor planet was named after English-born astronomer Gareth "Graff" Vaughan Williams (born 1965), who identified various low-numbered asteroids among bodies that had been given provisional designations. His work at the Minor Planet Center (MPC) has received much recognition.

The official naming citation was published by the Minor Planet Center on 10 April 1990 (M.P.C. 16245), based on a suggestion by long-time MPC director Brian G. Marsden (1937–2000) and by Conrad M. Bardwell (1926–2010), associate director of the MPC and who made the identification for this body. The minor planets 1615 Bardwell and 1877 Marsden were named in honor of these two prominent astronomers at the MPC.
