= Gareth V. Williams =

English-American astronomer

Gareth Vaughan Williams (born 1965 in Windlesham, England) is an English-American astronomer, who served as the associate director of the International Astronomical Union's Minor Planet Center (MPC) until his retirement in February 2020.

== Career ==
From January 1990 to February 2020, Williams has been one of the longest-serving staff members of the Minor Planet Center. He is an IAU member and was the MPC representative on various IAU committees and working groups, including the Working Group on Planetary System Nomenclature and is secretary of the Working Group on Small Body Nomenclature. Gareth got his undergraduate degree in astronomy at University College London, and his PhD in 2013 from the Open University. He is known for recovering the lost asteroids 878 Mildred in 1991 and 719 Albert in 2000.

He also identified the earliest known observation of a Jupiter trojan, when he linked A904 RD, an object seen on a single night in 1904 by E. E. Barnard, with (12126) Chersidamas. Barnard's observations, which he initially believed belonged to Saturn IX (Phoebe), were sufficient to show that the object was distant, but he did not follow it up. The first Jupiter trojan to be recognized as such, 588 Achilles, was discovered in 1906.

On 11 February 2020, the Minor Planet Center announced that Gareth Williams is retiring as its associate director.

== Awards and honors ==
Minor planet 3202 Graff, a Hilda asteroid discovered by Max Wolf at Heidelberg in 1908, was named in his honor on 10 April 1990 (M.P.C. 16245). The outer main belt asteroid 10257 Garecynthia was also named in honor of his marriage with Cynthia Marsden, daughter of former MPC director Brian G. Marsden.

== See also ==
- Brian G. Marsden
- Minor Planet Center
- Timothy B. Spahr
- 2298 Cindijon, another asteroid named after his wife Cynthia (and her brother)
