= 1125 China =

Main-belt asteroid

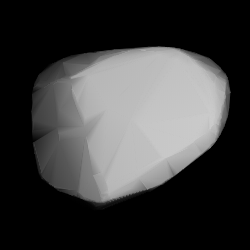
- Modelled shape of China from its lightcurve

Discovery
- Discovered by: Y. C. Chang
- Discovery site: Purple Mountain Obs.
- Discovery date: 30 October 1957

Designations
- Named after: China (country)
- Alternative designations: 1957 UN_{1} · 1959 EL; 1971 KX · 1974 VM; A909 BE
- Minor planet category: main-belt · (outer); background

Orbital characteristics
- Epoch 4 September 2017 (JD 2458000.5)
- Uncertainty parameter 0
- Observation arc: 108.75 yr (39,722 days)
- Aphelion: 3.8083 AU
- Perihelion: 2.4452 AU
- Semi-major axis: 3.1267 AU
- Eccentricity: 0.2180
- Orbital period (sidereal): 5.53 yr (2,019 days)
- Mean anomaly: 215.01°
- Mean motion: 0° 10^{m} 41.88^{s} / day
- Inclination: 3.0407°
- Longitude of ascending node: 97.172°
- Argument of perihelion: 10.745°

Physical characteristics
- Mean diameter: 21.86±6.06 km 23.95±6.03 km 26.084±0.199 km 26.513±0.354 km 26.64 km (calculated); 30.49±1.97 km
- Synodic rotation period: 5.367±0.002 h 5.45±0.02 h (Note: Stephens (2013): lightcurve plot of (1125) China, rotation period 5.45±0.02 hours. Summary figures at the LCDB)
- Pole ecliptic latitude: (132.0°, −46.0°) (λ_{1}/β_{1}); (305.0°, −49.0°) (λ_{2}/β_{2})
- Geometric albedo: 0.057 (assumed); 0.057±0.004; 0.06±0.03; 0.063±0.009; 0.08±0.06; 0.0860±0.0223
- Spectral type: C (assumed)
- Absolute magnitude (H): 11.20 · 11.26±0.19 · 11.60 · 11.70

1125 China (prov. designation: 1957 UN_{1}) is a dark background asteroid from the outer regions of the asteroid belt. It was discovered on 30 October 1957, by astronomer Zhāng Yùzhé (Y. C. Chang, 张钰哲) at the Chinese Purple Mountain Observatory (紫金山天文台) in Nanjing, and named in honor of the country China. The assumed C-type asteroid has a short rotation period of 5.4 hours and measures approximately 26 kilometers (16 miles) in diameter.

The name and number 1125 China were actually reassigned from another asteroid that had been lost. That asteroid was eventually recovered and given the new designation 3789 Zhongguo, which means "China" in Mandarin. "1125 China" is thus the only permanent designation and name of an asteroid that is ambiguous.

== Orbit and classification ==
China is a non-family asteroid of the main belt's background population when applying the hierarchical clustering method to its proper orbital elements. It orbits the Sun in the outer asteroid belt at a distance of 2.4–3.8 AU once every 5 years and 6 months (2,019 days; semi-major axis of 3.13 AU). Its orbit has an eccentricity of 0.22 and an inclination of 3° with respect to the ecliptic. The asteroid was first observed as A909 BE at Heidelberg Observatory in January 1909, where the body's observation arc begins three week later in February 1909, or more than 48 years prior to its official discovery observation at Nanking, China.

== Naming ==
This minor planet was named after People's Republic of China where the asteroid was discovered. The official naming citation was published by the Minor Planet Center on 31 May 1988 (M.P.C. 13179).

== Accidentally usurped designation ==
While studying in Chicago in 1928, Zhang Yuzhe discovered an asteroid that was given the provisional designation 1928 UF, and later the number 1125. He named it "China" or "中華" (Zhōnghuá). However, this asteroid was not observed beyond its initial appearance and a precise orbit could not be calculated. In 1957, the Purple Mountain Observatory in China discovered a new asteroid, and with Zhang Yuzhe's agreement the new object 1957 UN_{1} was reassigned the official designation 1125 China in place of the lost 1928 UF. However, in 1986, the newly discovered object 1986 QK_{1} was confirmed to be a rediscovery of the original 1928 UF, and this object was named 3789 Zhongguo. Zhongguo is the Chinese word for China.

== Physical characteristics ==
China is an assumed carbonaceous C-type asteroid.

=== Rotation period and poles ===
In February 2009, a rotational lightcurve of China was obtained from photometric observations by Kenneth T. Menzies at the Tigh Speuran Observatory (I14) in Massachusetts, United States. Lightcurve analysis gave a well-defined rotation period of 5.367 hours with a brightness variation of 0.38 magnitude (U=3). In October 2013, Robert Stephens measured a similar period of 5.45 hours and an amplitude of 0.62 magnitude at the Center for Solar System Studies (U81) in California (U=3-).

Published in 2016, an additional lightcurve was modeled from photometric data obtained by a large international collaboration of astronomers. Modelling gave a concurring sidereal rotation period of 5.36863±0.00005 hours, as well as two spin axes of (132.0°, −46.0°) and (305.0°, −49.0°) in ecliptic coordinates.

=== Diameter and albedo ===
According to the surveys carried out by the Japanese Akari satellite and the NEOWISE mission of NASA's Wide-field Infrared Survey Explorer, China measures between 21.86 and 30.49 kilometers in diameter and its surface has an albedo between 0.057 and 0.0860.

The Collaborative Asteroid Lightcurve Link assumes a standard albedo for carbonaceous asteroids of 0.057 and calculates a diameter of 26.64 kilometers based on an absolute magnitude of 11.6.
