= 3789 Zhongguo =

Asteroid

Discovery
- Discovered by: Y. C. Chang
- Discovery site: Yerkes Obs.
- Discovery date: 25 October 1928

Designations
- Pronunciation: /ˈdʒɒŋ.ɡwoʊ/
- Named after: China (Chinese transliteration)
- Alternative designations: 1928 UF · 1928 WC; 1975 VH_{1} · 1981 WY_{6} 1986 QK_{1}
- Minor planet category: main-belt · (outer); Zhongguo

Orbital characteristics
- Epoch 23 March 2018 (JD 2458200.5)
- Uncertainty parameter 0
- Observation arc: 89.57 yr (32,717 d)
- Aphelion: 3.8904 AU
- Perihelion: 2.6803 AU
- Semi-major axis: 3.2854 AU
- Eccentricity: 0.1842
- Orbital period (sidereal): 5.95 yr (2,175 d)
- Mean anomaly: 70.348°
- Mean motion: 0° 9^{m} 55.8^{s} / day
- Inclination: 2.7466°
- Longitude of ascending node: 86.955°
- Argument of perihelion: 313.35°

Physical characteristics
- Mean diameter: 14.01±0.18 km
- Synodic rotation period: 3.840±0.0005 h
- Geometric albedo: 0.099±0.013
- Spectral type: T (S3OS2-TH); Xk (S3OS2-BB)
- Absolute magnitude (H): 12.7

3789 Zhongguo, provisional designation 1928 UF and formerly named 1125 China, is a resonant asteroid from outermost region of the asteroid belt, approximately 14 kilometers (8.7 miles) in diameter. It was discovered in 1928 by Chinese astronomer Zhang Yuzhe at the Yerkes Observatory in Williams Bay, Wisconsin, in the United States. This T/Xk-type asteroid is the namesake of the resonant Zhongguo group, located in the asteroid belt's Hecuba gap. It has a short rotation period of 3.8 hours.

Originally named "China" in English (and 中華 in Chinese), the asteroid was quickly lost and in 1957 its name was transferred to another asteroid. After its re-discovery in 1986, it was renamed Zhongguo, the Mandarin name for China, and assigned the permanent designation (3789), making it the only asteroid that has been assigned two permanent designations.

== Discovery and re-discovery ==
While studying in Chicago, Chinese astronomer Zhang Yuzhe observed an unknown asteroid, provisionally designated 1928 UF for the first time on 25 October 1928. After it was (prematurely) given the number 1125, he named it "China" or "中国" (Zhōngguó) in honor of his native country. As it was not observed beyond its initial appearance, a precise orbit could not be calculated, and as a consequence, it became a lost asteroid.

In 1957, the Purple Mountain Observatory in China discovered another asteroid, 1957 UN1. With the consent of Zhang Yuzhe, the designation 1125 China was transferred from the 1928-lost asteroid to this newly discovered one. However, in August 1986, the newly observed object 1986 QK_{1} was identified as the rediscovery of the originally lost asteroid. On 31 May 1988 its official name Zhongguo was published by the Minor Planet Center (M.P.C. 13179).

== Orbit and classification ==
Zhongguo is a non-family asteroid from the main belt's background population. It orbits the Sun in the outer main-belt at a distance of 2.7–3.9 AU once every 5 years and 11 months (2,175 days; semi-major axis of 3.29 AU). Its orbit has an eccentricity of 0.18 and an inclination of 3° with respect to the ecliptic. The body's observation arc begins at Williams Bay in November 1928, eleven days after its official discovery observation.

=== Zhongguo group ===
It is also the namesake of the Zhongguo asteroids, a dynamical group with rather stable orbits. The group is located in the Hecuba gap – one of the largest Kirkwood gaps in the main belt at 3.27 AU – and stays in a 2:1 mean motion resonance with the gas giant Jupiter. It occupies a similar proper element space as the Griqua asteroids. Both the Zhongguos and Griquas mark the outer rim of the asteroid belt. Further out are the Cybele asteroids, which are sometimes described as the "last outpost" of the asteroid belt. They are followed in turn by the resonant Hilda asteroids (3:2) and Jupiter trojans (1:1).

== Physical characteristics ==
Zhongguo is classified as a T-type and X/k-subtype in the Tholen- and SMASS-like taxonomy of the Small Solar System Objects Spectroscopic Survey (S3OS2), respectively.

=== Diameter and albedo ===
According to the survey carried out by the NEOWISE mission of NASA's Wide-field Infrared Survey Explorer, Zhongguo measures 14.01 kilometers in diameter and its surface has an albedo of 0.099, while the Collaborative Asteroid Lightcurve Link assumes a standard albedo for a carbonaceous asteroidof 0.057 and calculates a diameter of 12.71 kilometers based on an absolute magnitude of 13.21.

=== Rotation period ===
In January 2012, a rotational lightcurve of Zhongguo obtained from photometric observations by astronomers at the Palomar Transient Factory in California. It gave a rotation period of 3.840±0.0005 hours with a brightness amplitude of 0.24 magnitude (U=2).
