= 6344 P-L =

Near-Earth asteroid

Discovery
- Discovered by: C. J. van Houten; I. van Houten-G. T. Gehrels
- Discovery site: Palomar Obs.
- Discovery date: 24 September 1960

Designations
- Alternative designations: 2007 RR_{9}
- Minor planet category: Apollo · NEO · PHA

Orbital characteristics
- Epoch 21 November 2025 (JD 2461000.5)
- Uncertainty parameter 0
- Observation arc: 60.86 yr (22,229 days)
- Aphelion: 4.6871 AU
- Perihelion: 0.9543 AU
- Semi-major axis: 2.8207 AU
- Eccentricity: 0.6617
- Orbital period (sidereal): 4.74 yr (1,730 days)
- Mean anomaly: 296.530°
- Mean motion: 0° 12^{m} 29.16^{s} / day
- Inclination: 4.6779°
- Longitude of ascending node: 183.76°
- Argument of perihelion: 235.05°
- Earth MOID: 0.0367 AU (11.1 LD)

Physical characteristics
- Mean diameter: 250 m (generic at 0.20); 460 m (generic at 0.06)
- Absolute magnitude (H): 20.52

6344 P-L is an unnumbered, sub-kilometer asteroid and suspected dormant comet, classified as a near-Earth object and potentially hazardous asteroid of the Apollo group that was first observed on 24 September 1960, by astronomers and asteroid searchers Tom Gehrels, Ingrid van Houten-Groeneveld, and Cornelis Johannes van Houten during the Palomar–Leiden survey at Palomar Observatory.

== Description ==
Since 6344 P-L is still unnumbered, the discoverers have not yet been officially determined. It was a lost asteroid from 1960 until it was recovered in 2007 by Peter Jenniskens as 2007 RR_{9} and recognized as the same object. It was again observed from 29 July 2021 to 4 August 2021 by Astronomical Research Observatory and Calar Alto-Schmidt.

It is either an asteroid or dormant comet nucleus, and it has a 4.7-year orbit around the Sun. The orbit goes out as far as Jupiter's but then back in, passing as close as 0.04 AU to the Earth, making it a collision risk.

=== Close approaches ===
The minor planet classifies as a potentially hazardous object with an Earth minimum orbit intersection distance of 0.0286 AU (4,280,000 km), equivalent to 11.1 lunar distances. Although it was not outgassing at the time of its recovery, its orbit indicates that it is probably a dormant comet.

== Physical characteristics ==
Based on a generic magnitude-to-diameter conversion, 6344 P-L measures between 250 and 460 meters for an assumed albedo between 0.20 and 0.06. As of 2018, no rotational lightcurve has been obtained. The body's rotation period, shape and pole remains unknown.

== Palomar–Leiden survey ==
The survey designation "P-L" stands for Palomar–Leiden, named after Palomar Observatory and Leiden Observatory, which collaborated on the fruitful Palomar–Leiden survey in the 1960s. Tom Gehrels used Palomar's 48-inch Samuel Oschin telescope and shipped the photographic plates to the van Houten's at Leiden Observatory, where astrometry was carried out. The trio are credited with more than 4600 minor planet discoveries.

== Numbering and naming ==
As of 2021, this minor planet has neither been numbered nor named and still remains provisionally designated (see list of unnumbered minor planets).
