= Zhang Yuzhe (crater) =

Crater on the Moon

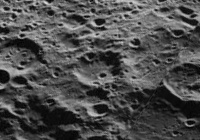
- Oblique Lunar Orbiter 5 image, facing west
- Coordinates: 69.1°S 137.8°W
- Diameter: 38 km
- Depth: 1.89 km (1.17 mi)
- Eponym: Zhang Yuzhe

Zhang Yuzhe is a lunar impact crater located on the Lunar far side near the southern pole. The crater is located between the prominent craters Crommelin and Zeeman. Zhang Yuzhe was adopted and named after Chinese astronomer Zhang Yuzhe by the IAU in August, 2010.

== See also ==
- 2051 Chang, asteroid
