= 1026 Ingrid =

Main-belt asteroid

Discovery
- Discovered by: K. Reinmuth
- Discovery site: Heidelberg Obs.
- Discovery date: 13 August 1923

Designations
- Named after: Ingrid, niece of astronomer Albrecht Kahrstedt
- Alternative designations: 1923 NY · 1957 UC; 1963 GD · 1981 WL_{8} 1986 CG_{2} · 1986 ES_{2}
- Minor planet category: main-belt · (inner); Flora

Orbital characteristics
- Epoch 4 September 2017 (JD 2458000.5)
- Uncertainty parameter 0
- Observation arc: 93.89 yr (34,294 days)
- Aphelion: 2.6636 AU
- Perihelion: 1.8458 AU
- Semi-major axis: 2.2547 AU
- Eccentricity: 0.1814
- Orbital period (sidereal): 3.39 yr (1,237 days)
- Mean anomaly: 292.55°
- Mean motion: 0° 17^{m} 27.96^{s} / day
- Inclination: 5.3994°
- Longitude of ascending node: 104.59°
- Argument of perihelion: 212.34°

Physical characteristics
- Dimensions: 5.73±1.01 km 6.96±0.68 km 7.353±0.082 km 7.670±0.069 km 8.19 km (calculated)
- Synodic rotation period: 5 h
- Geometric albedo: 0.1441±0.0250; 0.156±0.024; 0.175±0.035; 0.24 (assumed); 0.43±0.22
- Spectral type: S
- Absolute magnitude (H): 12.6 · 12.70 · 12.8 · 13.30

1026 Ingrid, provisional designation 1923 NY, is a stony Florian asteroid and long-lost minor planet (1923–1986) from the inner regions of the asteroid belt, approximately 7 kilometers in diameter. It was discovered by Karl Reinmuth at Heidelberg in 1923, and later named after Ingrid, niece and godchild of astronomer Albrecht Kahrstedt.

== Discovery and recovery ==
Ingrid was discovered on 13 August 1923, by German astronomer Karl Reinmuth at the Heidelberg-Königstuhl State Observatory in southwest Germany. The asteroid was observed for only a few days during August 1923, before it became a lost minor planet for nearly 63 years until its recovery by Japanese astronomer Syuichi Nakano in 1986.

Nakano was able to show that Ingrid had been observed and provisionally designated several times during its lost period: as 1957 UC at the discovering Heidelberg Observatory in October 1957, possibly as 1963 GD at Goethe Link Observatory in April 1963, as 1981 WL_{8} at the Crimean Astrophysical Observatory in November 1981, and as 1986 ES_{2} at Palomar Observatory in March 1986.

With the recovery of Ingrid in 1986, and the almost simultaneously recovered asteroid 1179 Mally, the list of long-lost numbered asteroids was reduced to four. The last remaining lost asteroid, 69230 Hermes, was recovered in 2003.

== Orbit and classification ==
Ingrid is a member of the Flora family (402), a giant asteroid family and the largest family of stony asteroids. It orbits the Sun in the inner main-belt at a distance of 1.8–2.7 AU once every 3 years and 5 months (1,237 days). Its orbit has an eccentricity of 0.18 and an inclination of 5° with respect to the ecliptic. The body's observation arc begins at Heidelberg, one night after its official discovery observation in 1923.

== Physical characteristics ==
Ingrid is an assumed S-type asteroid, in-line with the Flora family's spectral type.

=== Rotation period ===
A rotational lightcurve of Ingrid was obtained from photometric observations by a group of Hungarian astronomers. The 2005-published lightcurve analysis gave a rotation period of 5 hours with a brightness variation of 0.5 magnitude (U=2).

=== Diameter and albedo ===
According to the surveys carried out by the Japanese Akari satellite and the NEOWISE mission of NASA's Wide-field Infrared Survey Explorer, Ingrid measures between 5.73 and 7.67 kilometers in diameter and its surface has an albedo between 0.1441 and 0.43.

The Collaborative Asteroid Lightcurve Link assumes an albedo of 0.24 – derived from 8 Flora, the largest member and namesake of the Flora family – and calculates a diameter of 8.19 kilometers based an absolute magnitude of 12.6.

== Naming ==
This minor planet was named after Ingrid, niece and godchild of Albrecht Kahrstedt (1897–1971), a German astronomer at ARI and director of the institute's Potsdam division, who requested the naming of this asteroid and 984 Gretia (mother of Ingrid) in a personal letter to the discoverer in February 1926. Kahrstedt himself was honored with the naming of 1587 Kahrstedt.

The official naming citation was mentioned in The Names of the Minor Planets by Paul Herget in 1955 (H98). Lutz Schmadel quoted an excerpt of Kahrstedt's letter in his Dictionary of Minor Planet Names (LDS).
