= Zhang Yuzhe =

Chinese astronomer

- 张钰哲
- Born: 16 February 1902; Fuzhou, Minhou
- Died: 21 July 1986 (aged 84)
- Education: Tsinghua University; University of Chicago
- Scientific career
- Institutions: Purple Mountain Observatory; National Central University

Zhang Yuzhe
- Traditional Chinese: 張鈺哲
- Simplified Chinese: 张钰哲
Transcriptions
Standard Mandarin
- Hanyu Pinyin: Zhāng Yùzhé
- Wade–Giles: Chang Yü-che
- IPA: [ʈʂáŋ ŷʈʂɤ̌]
Southern Min
- Tâi-lô: Tiunn Gio̍k-tiat

Zhang Yuzhe (Chinese: 张钰哲; 16 February 1902 – 21 July 1986), also known as Yu-Che Chang, was a Chinese astronomer and director of the Purple Mountain Observatory who is widely regarded as the father of modern Chinese astronomy. He studied the light curves of asteroids, and thus their rotation periods. He also researched the variable star CZ Cassiopeiae and the evolution of the orbit of Comet Halley. Zhang discovered three comets and is credited under the name Y. C. Chang by the Minor Planet Center for the discovery of one minor planet, the outer main-belt asteroid 3789 Zhongguo.

== Biography ==
Zhang was born in Fuzhou in Minhou county, Fujian province in 1902. In 1919, he gained entrance to Tsinghua University. Graduating in 1923, he traveled to the United States where he began graduate studies at the University of Chicago in 1925, receiving his Ph.D. in 1929. Later that year, he returned to China and accepted a teaching post at the National Central University in Nanjing, China (now known as Nanjing University). He was the first astronomy professor at National Central University.

Zhang wrote his thesis on the orientation of the orbital plane of double stars under the mentorship of George Van Biesbroeck. While pursuing his Ph.D. at the University of Chicago, in 1928, Zhang discovered an asteroid which was given the provisional designation 1928 UF and later the number 1125. He named it "China" or "中華" (Zhōnghuá). However, this asteroid was "lost" as it was not observed beyond its initial appearance and a precise orbit could not be calculated (see lost asteroids). In 1957, while Zhang was director of the Purple Mountain Observatory in China, the observatory discovered a new asteroid. With his agreement the new object 1957 UN_{1} was reassigned the official designation 1125 China in place of the lost 1928 UF. However, in 1986, the newly discovered object 1986 QK_{1} was confirmed to be a rediscovery of the original 1928 UF, and this object was named 3789 Zhongguo ("中国" (Zhōngguó) is the Mandarin Chinese word for "China", in pinyin transliteration, whereas Zhōnghuá is a slightly older word for "China").

From 1941 to 1950, Zhang was head of the astronomy research institute at National Central University. Between 1946 and 1948, he returned to the United States to study variable stars. In 1950 Zhang became the director of the Purple Mountain Observatory, a position he held until 1984.

In 1955 he was elected a founding academician of the Chinese Academy of Sciences.

Zhang devoted himself to observing and calculating the orbits of minor planets and comets. Many asteroids were discovered at Purple Mountain Observatory, as well as three new comets: two periodic, 60P/Tsuchinshan (Tsuchinshan 2) and 62P/Tsuchinshan (Tsuchinshan 1), and one non-periodic, C/1977 V1. Tsuchinshan is the Wade-Giles transliteration corresponding to the pinyin Zĭjīn Shān, which is Mandarin Chinese for "Purple Mountain", named after the observatory he oversaw.

Asteroids discovered: 1
3789 Zhongguo	October 25, 1928	MPC

The lunar crater Zhang Yuzhe and the main-belt asteroid 2051 Chang are named after him.
