= Gyula Strommer =

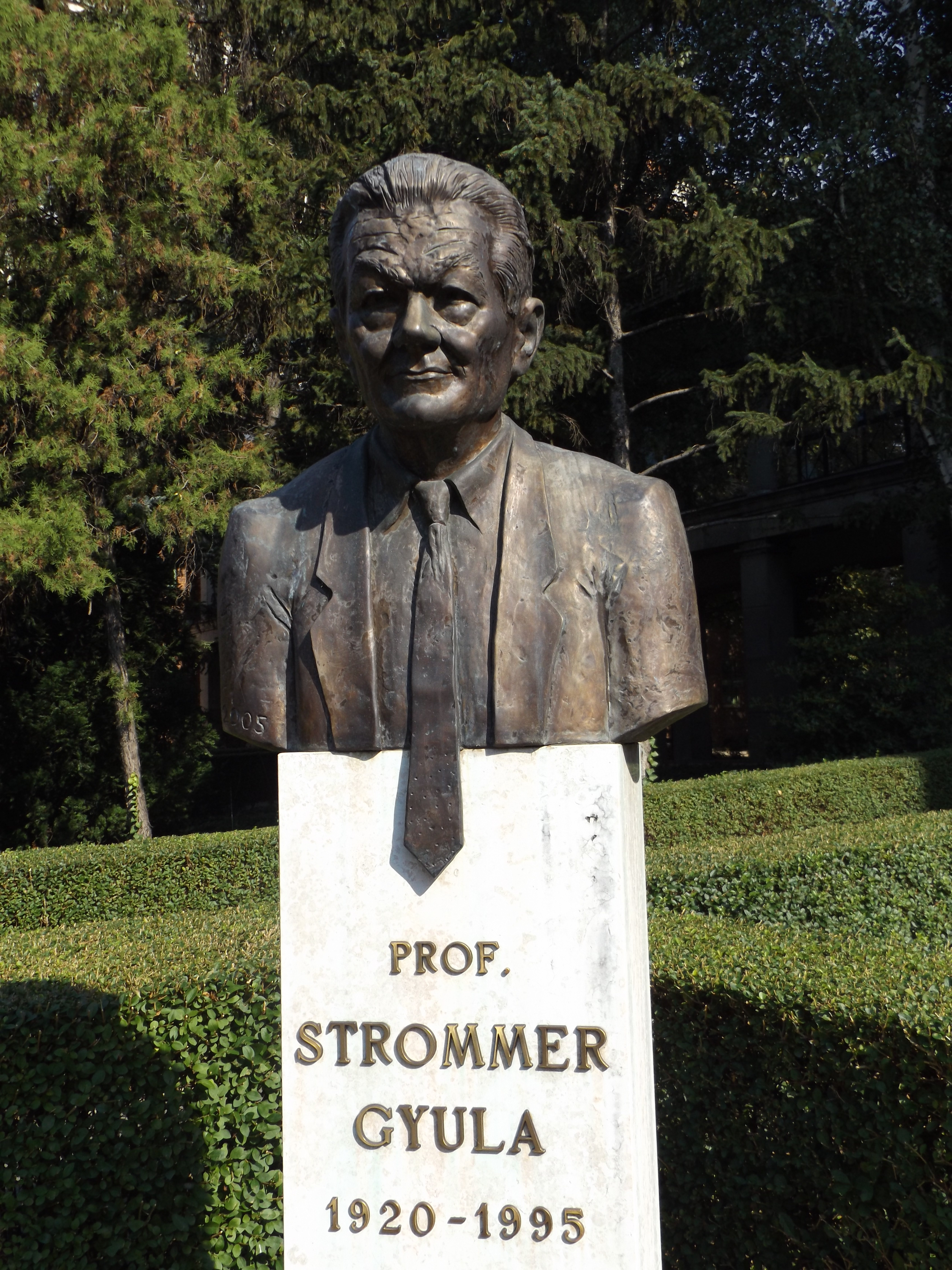
- His bust at Budapest Technical University
- Born: 8 May 1920; Aiud
- Died: 28 June 1995 (aged 75); Budapest, Hungary
- Citizenship: Hungarian
- Scientific career
- Fields: Mathematics

Gyula Strommer (8 May 1920 – 28 August 1995) was a Hungarian mathematician and astronomer.

He discovered an asteroid, 1537 Transylvania, on 27 August 1940. This was his first scientific success. From 1942, he was a teaching assistant in the Department of Descriptive Geometry at the Technical University of Budapest. In 1952, he became the head of the Descriptive Geometry Department. In 1972, he was appointed a university professor. Between 1981 and 1987, he was the dean of the Faculty of Mechanical Engineering.

His research topics: the foundations of geometry, Bolyai-Lobachevsky geometry.
