= Holger Thiele =

Danish American astronomer (1878–1946)

Asteroids discovered: 4
797 Montana	November 17, 1914	MPC
843 Nicolaia	September 30, 1916	MPC
1847 Stobbe	February 1, 1916	MPC
3229 Solnhofen	August 9, 1916	MPC

Holger Thiele (September 25, 1878 – June 5, 1946) was a Danish American astronomer and discoverer of minor planets and comets.

He was the son of Thorvald Nicolai Thiele (1838–1910), the noted Danish astronomer, actuary and mathematician, after whom the main-belt asteroid 1586 Thiele is named.

Holger Thiele is credited by the Minor Planet Center with the discovery of 4 numbered asteroids during 1914–1916. He also discovered the comet C/1906 V1 and calculated the orbits of other comets. He worked at Hamburg-Bergedorf Observatory at Bergedorf, in Hamburg, Germany. In 1912, he immigrated to the United States.

In 1917, he started working as a fellow for the University of California at Lick Observatory, near San Jose, California. Holger Thiele died in Alameda County in 1946.

== Selected works ==
- Corrected elements and ephemeris of minor planet 1924 TD (Baade) (University of California Press. 1925)
- Elements and ephemeris of Comet d 1927 (Stearns) (University of California Press. 1927)
