= 2007 WD5 =

Apollo and Mars-crosser asteroid

2007 WD_{5}
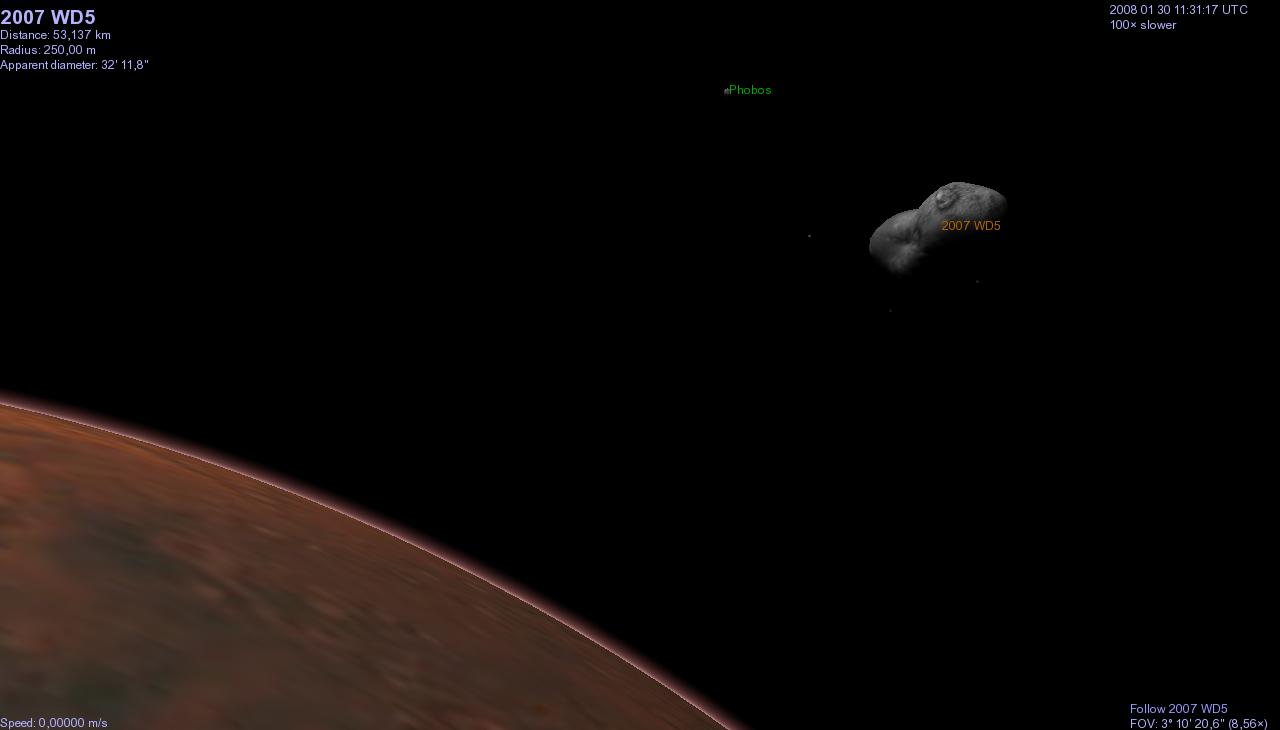
- Simulated image of 2007 WD_{5}'s approach of Mars, generated in Celestia.

Discovery
- Discovered by: Mount Lemmon Survey; Andrea Boattini (unofficial credits)
- Discovery date: 20 November 2007

Designations
- Minor planet category: NEO · Apollo; Mars-crosser

Orbital characteristics
- Epoch 21 November 2025 (JD 2461000.5)
- Uncertainty parameter 6 · 0
- Aphelion: 3.9256 AU (587.26 Gm)
- Perihelion: 0.99698 AU (149.146 Gm)
- Semi-major axis: 2.4613 AU (368.21 Gm)
- Eccentricity: 0.59494
- Orbital period (sidereal): 3.86 yr (1410.4 d)
- Average orbital speed: 12.5 km/s (27,900 mph)
- Mean anomaly: 246.916°
- Mean motion: 0° 15^{m} 18.864^{s} /day
- Inclination: 2.4358°
- Longitude of ascending node: 68.164°
- Argument of perihelion: 310.468°
- Earth MOID: 0.0278204 AU (4.16187 Gm)

Physical characteristics
- Dimensions: 50 m (160 ft)
- Absolute magnitude (H): 24.3

2007 WD_{5} is an Apollo asteroid some 50 m (160 ft) in diameter and a Mars-crosser asteroid first observed on 20 November 2007, by Andrea Boattini of the Catalina Sky Survey. Early observations of 2007 WD_{5} caused excitement amongst the scientific community when it was estimated as having as high as a 1 in 25 chance of colliding with Mars on 30 January 2008. However, by 9 January 2008, additional observations allowed NASA's Near Earth Object Program (NEOP) to reduce the uncertainty region resulting in only a 1-in-10,000 chance of impact. 2007 WD_{5} most likely passed Mars at a distance of 6.5 Mars radii. Due to this relatively small distance and the uncertainty level of the prior observations, the gravitational effects of Mars on its trajectory are unknown and, according to Steven Chesley of NASA's Jet Propulsion Laboratory Near-Earth Object program, 2007 WD_{5} is currently considered 'lost' (see lost asteroids).

== Discovery ==
The asteroid was discovered on 20 November 2007 by Andrea Boattini of the NASA-funded Catalina Sky Survey on Mount Lemmon, near Tucson, Arizona, United States, using a 1.5-meter telescope. It was discovered in the constellation Taurus at an apparent magnitude of +20. This is about 400,000 times fainter than most people can see with the naked eye on a dark night far from city lights. It was discovered nineteen days after passing near Earth. By the time it arrived at Mars it had an apparent magnitude of roughly +26 and therefore appeared over 100 times fainter than at the time of discovery.

== Orbit ==
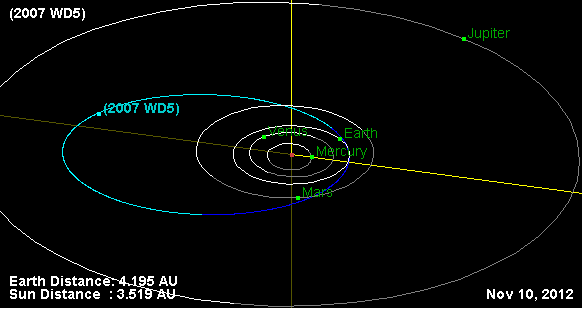
Orbit of 2007 WD_{5}

2007 WD_{5} orbits the Sun at a distance of 2.46 astronomical units. The orbit's eccentricity is 0.59 and its inclination is 2.4°.

== Mars encounter: chance of impact ==
=== Timeline of observations and events ===
- 1 November 2007: Nineteen days before its discovery, this small asteroid passed within 7.5 million km (5 million miles or 0.0476 AU) of the Earth.
- 20 November 2007: The asteroid was first discovered by Andrea Boattini of the Catalina Sky Survey.
- 21 December 2007: 2007 WD_{5} was approximately halfway between Earth and Mars traveling at 27,900 mph (44,900 km/h). It was estimated by NASA's Near Earth Object Program (NEOP) to have a 1-in-75 chance of colliding with Mars on 30 January 2008 at approximately 10:55 UT. It was thought it would pass about 50,000 km (0.00034AU) from Mars.
- 28 December 2007: NASA scientists at the Near-Earth Object program office at JPL announced they had found 2007 WD_{5} in 3 precovery images from 8 November 2007. The refined orbit placed the odds of a Mars impact at 1-in-25. The uncertainty region was reduced from 1 million km to roughly 400,000 km. The best fit trajectory had the asteroid passing within 21,000 km of Mars and only 16,000 km from the moon Deimos. The pre-discovery observations were located by Andy Puckett in the archive of the Sloan Digital Sky Survey II at the Apache Point Observatory.
- 2 January 2008: NASA scientists revised the probability of an impact with Mars to 1-in-28 after more observations were reported by Bill Ryan with the 2.4-meter telescope at New Mexico Tech's Magdalena Ridge Observatory. The uncertainty region was reduced to roughly 200,000 km and still intersected Mars, but the most likely path moved a little farther away from the planet.
- 8 January 2008: NASA scientists revised the probability of an impact with Mars to 1-in-40 after refinements to the analysis of the Sloan precovery observations and observations with the 3.5 meter telescope at the Calar Alto Observatory in Spain. The uncertainty region was reduced by a factor of 3.
- 9 January 2008: Following several new observations, NASA reduced the uncertainty region and effectively ruled out a Mars collision. The chance of collision became only 1-in-10,000 (0.01%). The best estimate was that around 12:00 UTC the asteroid passed about 26,000 km (0.00017AU) from the planet's center (about 7 Mars radii from the surface). Analyses show there is no possibility of an impact with either Mars or Earth in the next century.

This trend of increasing probability of impact followed by a dramatic decrease is typical as uncertainties are gradually reduced. In December 2004, a similar trend was observed with 99942 Apophis where the predicted probability of impact with Earth in 2029 at one point reached as high as 2.7%.

NASA Animation showing the motion of the uncertainty region of 2007 WD_{5} as it approaches Mars. The thin white line is the orbit of Mars. The blue line traces the motion of the center of the uncertainty region, which is the most likely position of the asteroid. Orbital data as known on 21 December 2007

=== Estimates of resulting impact ===
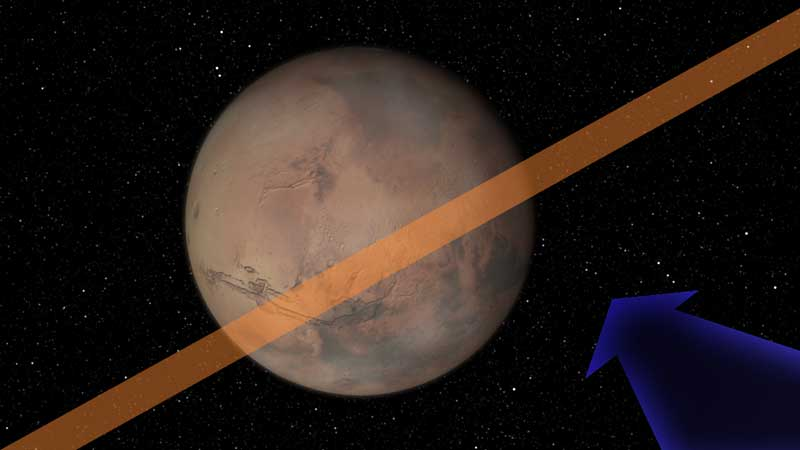
Track of asteroid 2007 WD_{5} over Mars (NASA/JPL)

If the asteroid had collided with Mars, it would have hit with a velocity of about 13.5 km/s (8.4 miles per second), and would have produced an explosion equivalent to about 3 megatons of TNT. Due to the thin atmosphere of Mars, it was predicted that the asteroid would have reached the surface intact and blasted out a crater approximately 0.8 km (0.5 mi) in diameter. A crater this size would be equal to the size of the Meteor Crater in Arizona, United States. NASA officials say if it had hit Mars, it would have done so north of the location of the Opportunity rover.

2007 WD_{5} is roughly the size of the cometary object that caused the Tunguska event in 1908, in remote central Siberia, Russia. Due to the Earth's greater gravity, an impact with the power of Tunguska is expected to occur once every few hundred years. Since Mars has only 1/10 the mass to attract objects, these types of impacts occur roughly every one thousand years on Mars.

== Future encounters ==
In July 2003, the asteroid passed within 0.012 AU of Mars. The exact fate of 2007 WD_{5} following the January 2008 Mars encounter is unknown although it likely passed Mars at a distance of 6.5 Mars radii. Mars, unlike Jupiter, is not big enough to eject the asteroid from the Solar System; however, the gravitation effect from the encounter on the asteroid's trajectory is uncertain and the asteroid is currently considered 'lost'. Assuming 2007 WD_{5} passed Mars safely, its low inclination to the ecliptic of only 2.3 degrees and high eccentricity of 0.6 could cause it to swing close to Mars or Earth for years or decades into the future.

== See also ==
- C/2013 A1 - Comet that passed extremely close to Mars on 19 October 2014
- Comet Shoemaker–Levy 9 - Jupiter impact 1994
- Impact events on Mars
