= 724 Hapag =

Minor planet orbiting the Sun

Discovery
- Discovered by: J. Palisa
- Discovery site: Vienna Obs.
- Discovery date: 21 October 1911

Designations
- Alternative designations: 1911 NC, 1988 VG_{2}

Orbital characteristics
- Epoch 31 July 2016 (JD 2457600.5)
- Uncertainty parameter 0
- Observation arc: 104.39 yr (38129 d)
- Aphelion: 3.0675 AU (458.89 Gm)
- Perihelion: 1.8441 AU (275.87 Gm)
- Semi-major axis: 2.4558 AU (367.38 Gm)
- Eccentricity: 0.24908
- Orbital period (sidereal): 3.85 yr (1405.7 d)
- Mean anomaly: 73.788°
- Mean motion: 0° 15^{m} 21.96^{s} / day
- Inclination: 11.707°
- Longitude of ascending node: 204.27°
- Argument of perihelion: 205.50°

Physical characteristics
- Synodic rotation period: 3.1305 h (0.13044 d)
- Absolute magnitude (H): 13.9

724 Hapag is a minor planet orbiting the Sun in the asteroid belt that was found by Austrian astronomer Johann Palisa in 1911 and named after the German shipping company Hamburg America Line. It was assigned a provisional name of 1911 NC, then became a lost asteroid until it was rediscovered in 1988 as 1988 VG_{2} by Tsutomu Hioki and N. Kawasato at Okutama, Japan.

Photometric observations of this asteroid at the Organ Mesa Observatory in Las Cruces, New Mexico in 2011 gave a light curve with a period of 3.1305 ± 0.0001 hours and a brightness variation of 0.11 ± 0.01 in magnitude.
