= 719 Albert =

Asteroid

Discovery
- Discovered by: J. Palisa
- Discovery site: Vienna Obs.
- Discovery date: 3 October 1911

Designations
- Named after: Albert Salomon Anselm von Rothschild (Austrian banker)
- Alternative designations: 1911 MT · 2000 JW_{8}
- Minor planet category: NEO · Amor

Orbital characteristics
- Epoch 4 September 2017 (JD 2458000.5)
- Uncertainty parameter 0
- Observation arc: 105.57 yr (38,560 days)
- Aphelion: 4.0830 AU
- Perihelion: 1.1964 AU
- Semi-major axis: 2.6397 AU
- Eccentricity: 0.5468
- Orbital period (sidereal): 4.29 yr (1,567 days)
- Mean anomaly: 270.46°
- Mean motion: 0° 13^{m} 47.28^{s} / day
- Inclination: 11.574°
- Longitude of ascending node: 183.92°
- Argument of perihelion: 156.12°
- Earth MOID: 0.2030 AU · 79.1 LD

Physical characteristics
- Dimensions: 2.36 km (calculated)
- Synodic rotation period: 5.8007±0.0003 h 5.801 h 5.8011±0.0034 h (Note: Pravec (2001) web: rotation period for (719) Albert of 5.8011±0.0034 and 5.8012±0.0034 hours with a brightness amplitude of 0.74 and 079 mag, respectively. Quality code of 3 (both). Summary figures at the LCDB and Ondrejov Asteroid Photometry Project, see data sheet.); 5.8012±0.0034 h 5.802 h 15.577±0.005 h (Note: Garlitz (2009): rotation period for (719) Albert of 15.577±0.005 hours with a brightness amplitude of 0.25±0.02 mag. Quality code of 2. Summary figures at the LCDB)
- Geometric albedo: 0.12; 0.15 (assumed); 0.20 (assumed)
- Spectral type: SMASS = S · S · X B–V = 0.855±0.023; V–R = 0.491±0.012; V–I = 0.870±0.013
- Absolute magnitude (H): 15.00 · 15.5 · 15.57±0.17

719 Albert, provisional designation 1911 MT, is a stony asteroid, approximately 2.5 kilometers in diameter, classified as a near-Earth object of the Amor group of asteroids. It was discovered by Austrian astronomer Johann Palisa at the Vienna Observatory on 3 October 1911, and subsequently a lost minor planet for 89 years. The asteroid was named in memory of Albert Salomon Anselm von Rothschild, an Austrian philanthropist and banker. Albert was the second Amor asteroid discovered, the first being 433 Eros.

== Orbit and classification ==
Albert orbits the Sun at a distance of 1.2–4.1 AU once every 4 years and 3 months (1,567 days). Its orbit has an eccentricity of 0.55 and an inclination of 12° with respect to the ecliptic. The asteroid's first observation is a precovery taken in September 1911 at Heidelberg Observatory, two weeks prior to its discovery at Vienna. The body's observation arc begins the night following its official discovery observation. Albert is also a Mars-crossing asteroid.

=== Close approaches ===
The asteroid has a minimum orbital intersection distance with Earth of 0.2030 AU (30.4 million km), which translates into 79.1 lunar distances. On 8 September 1911, shortly before its discovery, it made its closest approach at 0.2054 AU (30.7 million km). After another close encounter in 1941, Albert will not approach Earth to a similar distance until 2078.

== Discovery ==
Discovered in 1911 by Johann Palisa, Albert was named after one of the Imperial Observatory in Vienna's major benefactors, Albert Salomon von Rothschild, who had died some months before. Due to inaccuracies in the asteroid's computed orbit it was subsequently lost and not recovered until 2000 by Jeffrey Larsen using data from the Spacewatch asteroid survey project. Prior to being recovered in 2000, Albert was the last lost asteroid among those assigned numbers (69230 Hermes was not numbered until 2003). The second-last lost numbered asteroid, 878 Mildred, had been recovered in 1991.

When it was rediscovered, Albert was mistakenly thought to be a new asteroid and was designated 2000 JW_{8}. Upon further investigation, however, it was noticed that its orbital plane matched up nicely with the last remaining lost asteroid and it was properly identified. Using the new observational data, the period was determined to be about 4.28 years instead of the 4.1 years calculated in 1911; this discrepancy was the primary reason the asteroid was lost.

...asteroids were sometimes assigned numbers before accurate orbital elements had been determined, and so some numbered asteroids could not later be located. These objects were referred to as "lost" asteroids. The final lost numbered asteroid, (719) Albert, was recovered in 2000 after a lapse of 89 years. Many newly discovered asteroids still become "lost" ...

— Encyclopædia Britannica

== Physical properties ==
In the SMASS classification, Albert is a common stony S-type asteroid. Others also characterized it as a stony asteroid, while a study using Sloan photometry considers it to be an X-type asteroid.

Most of what is known about 719 Albert comes from observations taken after its rediscovery. In 2001 it passed near the Earth, allowing for a series of observations at differing phase angles. During this pass its rotational period was calculated at 5.802 hours and a measured absolute magnitude of 15.43 together with an assumed albedo of 0.12 gave a diameter of 2.8 km. Another group led by R. P. Binzel measured an absolute magnitude of 15.8; they, however, used an assumed albedo of 0.15 leading to a calculated diameter of 2.4 km.

The Collaborative Asteroid Lightcurve Link assumes a standard albedo for stony asteroids of 0.20 and calculates a diameter of 2.36 kilometers based on an absolute magnitude of 15.5.
