= Magnesium sulfite =

Names
- IUPAC name Magnesium sulfite
- Other names Magnesium sulphite

Identifiers
CAS Number	7757-88-2; trihydrate: 19086-20-5; hexahydrate: 13446-29-2
3D model (JSmol)	Interactive image; trihydrate: Interactive image; hexahydrate: Interactive image
ChemSpider	2282946
ECHA InfoCard	100.028.932
EC Number	231-825-6
PubChem CID	3014583; trihydrate: 22005976; hexahydrate: 22005975
UNII	792J6K230W; trihydrate: 5AY4M0SU9Y; hexahydrate: 517M335CTF
CompTox Dashboard (EPA)	DTXSID50884418; trihydrate: DTXSID60172595; hexahydrate: DTXSID70158724
- InChI: InChI=1S/Mg.H2O3S/c;1-4(2)3/h;(H2,1,2,3)/q+2;/p-2 Key: JESHZQPNPCJVNG-UHFFFAOYSA-L; trihydrate: InChI=1S/Mg.H2O3S.3H2O/c;1-4(2)3;;;/h;(H2,1,2,3);3*1H2/q+2;;;;/p-2 Key: AGRLKNFKXGZQRX-UHFFFAOYSA-L; hexahydrate: InChI=1S/Mg.H2O3S.6H2O/c;1-4(2)3;;;;;;/h;(H2,1,2,3);6*1H2/q+2;;;;;;;/p-2 Key: KLIKMSKEFPRHEE-UHFFFAOYSA-L
- SMILES: [O-]S(=O)[O-].[Mg+2]; trihydrate: O.O.O.[O-]S(=O)[O-].[Mg+2]; hexahydrate: O.O.O.O.O.O.[O-]S(=O)[O-].[Mg+2]

Properties
Chemical formula	MgSO_{3} (anhydrous); MgSO_{3}·6H_{2}O
Molar mass	104.368200 g/mol (anhydrous); 212.4599 g/mol (hexahydrate)
Solubility in water	5.2g/L at 298.2K (hexahydrate)
- Except where otherwise noted, data are given for materials in their standard state (at 25 °C [77 °F], 100 kPa). Infobox references

Magnesium sulfite is the magnesium salt of sulfurous acid with the formula MgSO_{3}. Its most common hydrated form has 6 water molecules making it a hexahydrate, MgSO_{3}·6H_{2}O. When heated above 40 °C (104 °F), it is dehydrated to magnesium sulfite trihydrate, or MgSO_{3}·3H_{2}O. The anhydrous form is hygroscopic, meaning that it readily absorbs water from the air.

== See also ==
- Calcium sulfite
- Magnesium sulfate (Epsom salt)
