= 330 Adalberta =

Main-belt asteroid

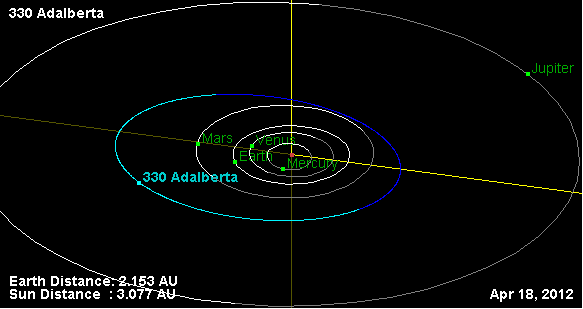
- Orbital diagram

Discovery
- Discovered by: M. F. Wolf
- Discovery site: Heidelberg Obs.
- Discovery date: 2 February 1910

Designations
- Pronunciation: /ædəlˈbɜːrtə/
- Named after: Adalbert Merx (discoverer's family); Adalbert Krüger (astronomer)
- Alternative designations: A910 CB · 1937 AD; 1951 SW · 1974 OQ; 1978 PS_{1} · 1978 QJ_{3} 1980 EE
- Minor planet category: main-belt · (inner)

Orbital characteristics
- Epoch 16 February 2017 (JD 2457800.5)
- Uncertainty parameter 0
- Observation arc: 106.36 yr (38,848 days)
- Aphelion: 3.0929 AU
- Perihelion: 1.8426 AU
- Semi-major axis: 2.4677 AU
- Eccentricity: 0.2533
- Orbital period (sidereal): 3.88 yr (1,416 days)
- Mean anomaly: 283.89°
- Mean motion: 0° 15^{m} 15.12^{s} / day
- Inclination: 6.7569°
- Longitude of ascending node: 137.14°
- Argument of perihelion: 259.26°

Physical characteristics
- Mean diameter: 9.111±0.303 km
- Synodic rotation period: 3.5553±0.0001 h
- Geometric albedo: 0.20 (assumed); 0.256±0.045
- Spectral type: S
- Absolute magnitude (H): 12.30 · 12.4 · 12.46±0.26

330 Adalberta (prov. designation: A910 CB) is a stony asteroid from the inner regions of the asteroid belt, approximately 9.5 kilometers in diameter. It was discovered by Max Wolf in 1910. In the 1980s, the asteroid's permanent designation and name (330) Adalberta were reassigned from the spurious object 1892 X. That object was likely named for either Adalbert Merx or Adalbert Krüger. (Note: In 1982, a reexamination of the original plates by Richard Martin West, C. Madsen, and Lutz D. Schmadel showed that 1892 X were galactic stars.)

== Discovery ==
Adalberta was discovered on 2 February 1910, by German astronomer Max Wolf at Heidelberg Observatory in southern Germany.

On 18 March 1892, a spurious body reported by Wolf was given the provisional designation 1892 X, and then the permanent designation and name 330 Adalberta. However, other astronomers were unable to recover it. (See lost minor planet.) In 1982, it was determined that Wolf had measured two stars that he had erroneously reported as asteroids, including the spurious 330 Adalberta. As the permanent designation 330 now had no referent, it and the name were for the asteroid A910 CB, which had been discovered by the same astronomer and was unusual for an early discovery in not having a number or name. (A910 CB had been briefly observed in 1910, 1937, 1951, 1974, twice in 1978, and 1980, receiving a new designation on each occasion before it was recognised that all were the same object.) The MPC citation of the reassigned number and name was published on 6 June 1982 (M.P.C. 6939).

== Orbit and classification ==
The S-type asteroid orbits the Sun in the inner main-belt at a distance of 1.8–3.1 AU once every 3 years and 11 months (1,416 days). Its orbit has an eccentricity of 0.25 and an inclination of 7° with respect to the ecliptic. Adalberta's observation arc begins with its official discovery observation at Heidelberg in 1910.

== Naming ==
This minor planet was named in honor of the discoverer's father-in-law, Adalbert Merx (after whom another minor planet 808 Merxia is also named). However it is also possible that it was named for Adalbert Krüger (1832–1896), a German astronomer and editor of the Astronomische Nachrichten, which was one of the first international journals in the field of astronomy. The naming citation was first mentioned in The Names of the Minor Planets by Paul Herget in 1955 (H 37).

== Physical characteristics ==
=== Rotation period ===
In 2013, a rotational lightcurve of Adalberta was obtained from photometric observations at Los Algarrobos Observatory (I38) in Uruguay. Light-curve analysis gave a well-defined rotation period of 3.5553±0.0001 hours with a brightness variation of 0.44 magnitude (U=3).

=== Diameter and albedo ===
According to the survey carried out by NASA's Wide-field Infrared Survey Explorer with its subsequent NEOWISE mission, Adalberta measures 9.11 kilometers in diameter, and its surface has an albedo of 0.256, while the Collaborative Asteroid Lightcurve Link assumes a standard albedo for stony asteroids of 0.20 and calculates a diameter of 9.84 kilometers using an absolute magnitude of 12.4.
