= 843 Nicolaia =

Main-belt asteroid

Discovery
- Discovered by: H. Thiele
- Discovery site: Bergedorf Obs.
- Discovery date: 30 September 1916

Designations
- Pronunciation: /nɪkəˈleɪə/
- Named after: Thorvald Nicolai Thiele
- Alternative designations: 1916 AN

Orbital characteristics
- Epoch 31 July 2016 (JD 2457600.5)
- Uncertainty parameter 0
- Observation arc: 98.61 yr (36018 d)
- Aphelion: 2.7576 AU (412.53 Gm)
- Perihelion: 1.8007 AU (269.38 Gm)
- Semi-major axis: 2.2792 AU (340.96 Gm)
- Eccentricity: 0.20993
- Orbital period (sidereal): 3.44 yr (1256.8 d)
- Mean anomaly: 31.275°
- Mean motion: 0° 17^{m} 11.22^{s} / day
- Inclination: 8.0014°
- Longitude of ascending node: 4.0938°
- Argument of perihelion: 317.16°

Physical characteristics
- Absolute magnitude (H): 13.8

843 Nicolaia is a main-belt asteroid discovered by Danish astronomer H. Thiele on 30 September 1916. It was a lost asteroid for 65 years before being rediscovered by Astronomisches Rechen-Institut at Heidelberg in 1981. The asteroid is orbiting the Sun with a period of 3.44 years.
