= Rainer Hannig =

German Egyptologist (1952–2022)

- Born: 19 August 1952; Eime, Lower Saxony, West Germany
- Died: 29 January 2022 (aged 69)
- Education: University of Tübingen
- Occupation: Egyptologist

Rainer Hannig (19 August 1952 – 29 January 2022) was a German Egyptologist.

== Biography ==
Hannig studied Egyptology, lexicography, and linguistics and earned a master's degree from the University of Tübingen in 1979. From 1984 to 1987, he was a guest professor in Egyptology at the Institute for the History of Ancient Civilizations and the Northeast Normal University. From 1998 to 2000, he worked at the Roemer- und Pelizaeus-Museum Hildesheim. During this time, he led excursions to Egypt with the German Research Foundation. He discovered the tomb of Iri-en-achti, a king of the Sixth Dynasty of Egypt.

In 2002, Hannig directed the project Wesirgrab-Projekt alongside Günter Dreyer at the German Archaeological Institute, which took place in a cemetery near the Pyramids of Giza. In 2003, he began teaching Egyptology as an honorary professor at the University of Marburg. He was the author of Hannig-Lexica, a series of dictionaries which contained a complete collection of Ancient Egyptian words, such as Egyptian hieroglyphs and hieratics. In January 2022, Ägyptisches Wörterbuch III. Neues Reich was in the stages of being published. In June 2020, he published a website dedicated to research on the Voynich manuscript.

Hannig died on 29 January 2022, at the age of 69.

== Publications ==
- Pseudopartizip und sDm.n=f. Der Kernbereich des mittelägyptischen Verbalsystems (1991)
- Die Sprache der Pharaonen. Großes Handwörterbuch Ägyptisch-Deutsch (1995)
- Wortschatz der Pharaonen in Sachgruppen. Kulturhandbuch Ägyptens (1999)
- Altes Reich und Erste Zwischenzeit (2003)
- Mittleres Reich und Zweite Zwischenzeit (2006)
- Zur Paläographie der Särge aus Assiut (2006)
