= 473 Nolli =

Main-belt asteroid

Discovery
- Discovered by: Max Wolf
- Discovery site: Heidelberg Obs.
- Discovery date: 13 February 1901

Designations
- Pronunciation: German: [ˈnɔliː]
- Alternative designations: 1901 GC, 1940 CD; 1940 CP, 1981 QR; 1986 PP_{4}
- Minor planet category: Main belt Eunomia family

Orbital characteristics
- Epoch 31 July 2016 (JD 2457600.5)
- Uncertainty parameter 0
- Observation arc: 115.18 yr (42068 d)
- Aphelion: 2.9454 AU (440.63 Gm)
- Perihelion: 2.3809 AU (356.18 Gm)
- Semi-major axis: 2.6632 AU (398.41 Gm)
- Eccentricity: 0.10599
- Orbital period (sidereal): 4.35 yr (1587.5 d)
- Mean anomaly: 229.46°
- Mean motion: 0° 13^{m} 36.408^{s} / day
- Inclination: 12.917°
- Longitude of ascending node: 332.24°
- Argument of perihelion: 152.30°

Physical characteristics
- Dimensions: ~ 13–28 km
- Synodic rotation period: 3.0785 h (0.12827 d)
- Absolute magnitude (H): 11.7

473 Nolli is a small asteroid that may be in the Eunomia family. It was discovered by Max Wolf on February 13, 1901, who only observed it for 1 month. It had become a lost asteroid and was recovered in 1987, 86 years after its discovery.
