= 878 Mildred =

Main-belt asteroid

Discovery
- Discovered by: S. B. Nicholson; H. Shapley
- Discovery site: Mount Wilson Obs.
- Discovery date: 6 September 1916

Designations
- Named after: Mildred Shapley Matthews
- Alternative designations: 1916 f, 1985 VG_{6}, 1991 GZ_{8}
- Minor planet category: main-belt Nysa–Polana complex

Orbital characteristics
- Epoch 31 July 2016 (JD 2457600.5)
- Uncertainty parameter 0
- Observation arc: 99.57 yr (36368 days)
- Aphelion: 2.8953 AU (433.13 Gm)
- Perihelion: 1.8286 AU (273.55 Gm)
- Semi-major axis: 2.3619 AU (353.34 Gm)
- Eccentricity: 0.22580
- Orbital period (sidereal): 3.63 yr (1325.9 d)
- Mean anomaly: 198.89°
- Mean motion: 0° 16^{m} 17.472^{s} / day
- Inclination: 2.0648°
- Longitude of ascending node: 172.83°
- Argument of perihelion: 190.14°

Physical characteristics
- Dimensions: ~4 km
- Synodic rotation period: 2.660 h (0.1108 d)
- Spectral type: S
- Absolute magnitude (H): 14.7

878 Mildred is an asteroid orbiting the Sun in the main asteroid belt. It has been proposed to host an asteroid family called the Mildred family, which is thought to belong in the Nysa–Polana complex. The Mildred subgroup, and by extension 878 Mildred itself, is thought to have been formed by a recent fragmentation event from a larger asteroid.

== Discovery ==
878 Mildred was originally discovered in 1916 using the 1.5 m Hale Telescope at the Mount Wilson Observatory, but was subsequently lost until it was again observed on single nights in 1985 and 1991 (a lost asteroid). Initially only two observations of the asteroid were taken on 1916-09-06 which does not allow for an accurate orbital determination, however interest in the object prompted further investigation and more measurements were taken in late September and October. The asteroid was re-discovered in 1991 by Gareth V. Williams. It is named after Mildred Shapley Matthews.

== Physical properties ==
By comparing the asteroid's perceived brightness and the then computed distance from the Sun the discoverers arrived at an absolute visual magnitude of 14.3, which if one assumes Mars-like albedo gives an approximate diameter of 3 to 5 kilometers.
