= 1009 Sirene =

Mars-crossing asteroid

Discovery
- Discovered by: K. Reinmuth
- Discovery site: Heidelberg Obs.
- Discovery date: 31 October 1923

Designations
- Pronunciation: German: [ˈziːʁeːnə]
- Named after: Siren (Σειρήν - Sīrēn) (Greek mythology)
- Alternative designations: 1923 PE
- Minor planet category: Mars-crosser

Orbital characteristics
- Epoch 4 September 2017 (JD 2458000.5)
- Uncertainty parameter 0
- Observation arc: 92.69 yr (33,854 days)
- Aphelion: 3.8207 AU
- Perihelion: 1.4259 AU
- Semi-major axis: 2.6233 AU
- Eccentricity: 0.4564
- Orbital period (sidereal): 4.25 yr (1,552 days)
- Mean anomaly: 11.512°
- Mean motion: 0° 13^{m} 55.2^{s} / day
- Inclination: 15.775°
- Longitude of ascending node: 229.46°
- Argument of perihelion: 186.35°
- Earth MOID: 0.4384 AU · 170.8 LD

Physical characteristics
- Dimensions: 5 km (est. at 0.20)
- Absolute magnitude (H): 13.9

Sirene (minor planet designation: 1009 Sirene), provisional designation 1923 PE, is an eccentric asteroid and sizable Mars-crosser from the central regions of the asteroid belt, approximately 5 kilometers in diameter. It was discovered by German astronomer Karl Reinmuth at the Heidelberg-Königstuhl State Observatory on 31 October 1923. The asteroid was named after the Siren from Greek mythology.

== Orbit and classification ==
Sirene is a Mars-crossing asteroid with a notably large semi-major axis is 2.62 AU, due to its high eccentricity of 0.46. It orbits the Sun in the central main-belt at a distance of 1.4–3.8 AU once every 4 years and 3 months (1,552 days). Its orbit has an inclination of 16° with respect to the ecliptic.

The body's observation arc begins 9 days after its official discovery observation at Bergedorf Observatory in Hamburg. On 8 June 1949, Sirene passed 0.049 AU (7,300,000 km; 4,600,000 mi) from Mars.

=== Aethra group and mass of Mars ===
Sirene had been of great interest in 1930s. After its discovery, it was observed at Algiers, Bergedorf, Heidelberg, Milan, Vienna and Williams Bay in the United States, where it became too faint to be accurately observed. It was regarded as an excellent example of a member of the then called "Aethra group" – 132 Aethra was the first discovered Mars-crossing asteroid – highly appropriate to measure the exact mass of Mars on its next opposition near perihelion in 1937. However, after its last observation at Williams Bay in 1924, Sirene had only been observed once at Turku Observatory in 1940, and remained unobserved until the 1980s.

== Physical characteristics ==
=== Rotation period ===
As of 2017, no rotational lightcurve of Sirene has been obtained from photometric observations. The asteroid's rotation period, shape and poles remain unknown.

=== Diameter and albedo ===
Sirene has not been observed by any large-scale, space-based surveys such as IRAS, NEOWISE and Akari. Based on a generic magnitude-to-diameter conversion, Sirene measures 5 kilometers in diameter for an absolute magnitude of 13.9 and an assumed stony albedo of 0.20. For an assumed albedo of 0.10 and 0.05, its calculated diameter would increase to 7.1 and 10 kilometers, respectively.

== Naming ==
This minor planet was named from Greek mythology after the Siren, who lured nearby sailors with their enchanting music and voices to shipwreck on the rocky coast of their island. The official naming citation was mentioned in The Names of the Minor Planets by Paul Herget in 1955 (H 96).
