= 1179 Mally =

Formerly lost asteroid

- Motion blurred image of 1179 Mally (center) from the ESO Schmidt Telescope in 1986

Discovery
- Discovered by: M. F. Wolf
- Discovery site: Heidelberg Obs.
- Discovery date: 19 March 1931

Designations
- Named after: Mally Wolf (discoverer's daughter-in-law)
- Alternative designations: 1931 FD
- Minor planet category: main-belt · (middle)

Orbital characteristics
- Epoch 4 September 2017 (JD 2458000.5)
- Uncertainty parameter 0
- Observation arc: 86.30 yr (31,520 days)
- Aphelion: 3.0682 AU
- Perihelion: 2.1698 AU
- Semi-major axis: 2.6190 AU
- Eccentricity: 0.1715
- Orbital period (sidereal): 4.24 yr (1,548 days)
- Mean anomaly: 104.44°
- Mean motion: 0° 13^{m} 57^{s} / day
- Inclination: 8.7067°
- Longitude of ascending node: 6.8116°
- Argument of perihelion: 234.15°

Physical characteristics
- Dimensions: 10.65 km (calculated); 11.20±0.83 km 13.159±0.183 km 13.379±0.077 km 14.41±0.47 km 16.60±5.64 km
- Synodic rotation period: 46.6917±0.1516 h
- Geometric albedo: 0.059±0.020; 0.0683±0.0080; 0.07±0.09; 0.071±0.017; 0.097±0.015; 0.10 (assumed)
- Spectral type: S/C
- Absolute magnitude (H): 12.530±0.002 (R) · 12.70 · 12.8 · 12.9 · 12.98

1179 Mally, provisional designation 1931 FD, is an asteroid and long-lost minor planet from the central region of the asteroid belt, approximately 13 kilometers in diameter. Discovered by Max Wolf in 1931, the asteroid was lost until its rediscovery in 1986. The discoverer named it after his daughter-in-law, Mally Wolf.

== Discovery and rediscovery ==
Mally was discovered on 19 March 1931, by German astronomer Max Wolf at Heidelberg Observatory in southwest Germany.

Soon after its initial discovery, it became one of few well known lost minor planets for over 55 years. In 1986, Mally was rediscovered by astronomers Lutz Schmadel, Richard Martin West and Hans-Emil Schuster, who remeasured the original discovery plates and computed alternative search ephemerides. This allowed them to find the body very near to its predicted position. In addition, historic photographic plates from the Palomar Sky Survey (1956–1958), the UK Schmidt Telescope (Australia), and the ESO Schmidt Telescope (Chile) confirmed the rediscovery.

== Orbit and classification ==
Mally orbits the Sun in the central main-belt at a distance of 2.2–3.1 AU once every 4 years and 3 months (1,548 days). Its orbit has an eccentricity of 0.17 and an inclination of 9° with respect to the ecliptic. The body's observation arc begins with its official discovery observation at Heidelberg in 1931.

== Physical characteristics ==
=== Diameter and albedo ===
According to the surveys carried out by the Japanese Akari satellite and the NEOWISE mission of NASA's Wide-field Infrared Survey Explorer, Mally measures between 11.20 and 16.60 kilometers in diameter, and its surface has an albedo between 0.059 and 0.097.

The Collaborative Asteroid Lightcurve Link assumes an albedo of 0.10 – a compromise value between the brighter stony (0.20) and darker carbonaceous asteroids (0.057) used for bodies with a semi-major axis between 2.6 and 2.7 AU – and calculates a diameter of 10.7 kilometers based on an absolute magnitude of 12.98.

=== Rotation period ===
In September 2013, a rotational lightcurve of Mally was obtained from photometric observations taken at the Palomar Transient Factory in California. The fragmentary lightcurve gave a longer than average rotation period of 46.6 hours with a brightness variation of 0.08 magnitude. However, the obtained result is poorly rated by CALL (U=1).

== Naming ==
This minor planet was named after Mally Wolf, wife of Franz Wolf and the discoverer's daughter-in-law. The official naming citation was published by Paul Herget in The Names of the Minor Planets in 1955 (H 110).
