= Provisional designation in astronomy =

Designation of an astronomical body after its discovery and before its official name

Yearly number of provisional minor planet designations assigned by the MPC since 1990. As of May 2019, a total of 1,426,477 designations have been assigned since 1869.

Provisional designation is the internationally standardized naming convention applied to astronomical objects immediately following their discovery announcement.

In the case of minor planets, more than one provisional designation may be assigned to independent discoveries of an object. Once they are recognized as denoting the same object, one of these (not necessarily the earliest) will be chosen as the primary designation for the object, based on who will get credit for the discovery. The provisional designation is augmented by a permanent designation – a catalog number – once a reliable orbit has been calculated. Provisional designations are superseded by a name in the minority of cases where one is given. As of 2019, approximately 47% of the more than 1,100,000 known minor planets remain unnumbered, as hundreds of thousands had been discovered in the previous two decades, and 4% of numbered objects have been assigned a name. This system is overseen by the Minor Planet Center of the International Astronomical Union.

== Minor planets ==
The current system of provisional designation of minor planets (asteroids, centaurs and trans-Neptunian objects) has been in place since 1925. It superseded several previous conventions, each of which was in turn rendered obsolete by the increasing numbers of minor planet discoveries. A modern or new-style provisional designation consists of the year of discovery, followed by two letters and, possibly, a suffixed number.

=== Modern provisional designations ===
The modern convention for designating bodies was established in 1925. It includes the year of discovery, a two-letter code that indicates the (half) month and order of discovery within that month, and optionally a numerical suffix once those codes have been used up. For example, the provisional designation 1992 QB_{1} (corresponding to 15760 Albion) stands for the 27th body identified during 16–31 Aug 1992:

- 1992 – the first element indicates the year of discovery.
- Q – the first letter indicates the half-month of the object's discovery within that year and ranges from A (first half of January) to Y (second half of December), while the letters I and Z are not used (see table below). The first half is always the 1st through to the 15th of the month, regardless of the numbers of days in the second "half". Thus, Q indicates the period from Aug 16 to 31.
- B_{1} – the second letter and a numerical suffix indicate the order of discovery within that half-month. The first 25 discoveries of the half-month receive a letter A to Z (excluding the letter I, which is not used to avoid confusion with the digit 1). Because modern techniques typically yield hundreds if not thousands of discoveries per half-month, a subscript number is appended to subsequent discoveries within that half-month to indicate the number of times that the letters A to Z have been cycled through. Thus the suffix 1 indicates discoveries after one completed cycle, namely the 26th through 50th discoveries. Combined with the letter B designating the 2nd discovery in that cycle, B_{1} indicates the 27th minor planet discovered in the half-month.
- The packed form of 1992 QB_{1} is J92Q01B.

First letter
A	B	C	D	E	F	G	H	J	K	L	M	N	O	P	Q	R	S	T	U	V	W	X	Y	—
January		February		March		April		May		June		July		August		September		October		November		December		—
1–15	16–31	1–15	16–29	1–15	16–31	1–15	16–30	1–15	16–31	1–15	16–30	1–15	16–31	1–15	16–31	1–15	16–30	1–15	16–31	1–15	16–30	1–15	16–31	—
Second letter
A	B	C	D	E	F	G	H	J	K	L	M	N	O	P	Q	R	S	T	U	V	W	X	Y	Z
1	2	3	4	5	6	7	8	9	10	11	12	13	14	15	16	17	18	19	20	21	22	23	24	25

Subscript
none	1	2	3	4	5	6	7	8	9	10	11	12	...	n
0	25	50	75	100	125	150	175	200	225	250	275	300		25n

This scheme is now also used retrospectively for pre-1925 discoveries. For these, the first digit of the year is replaced by an A. For example, A801 AA indicates the first object discovered in the first half of January 1801 (1 Ceres).

=== Further explanations ===
- During the first half-month of January 2014, the first minor planet identification was assigned the provisional designation 2014 AA. Then the assignment continued to the end of the cycle at 2014 AZ, which was in turn followed by the first identification of the second cycle, 2014 AA_{1}. The assignment in this second cycle continued with 2014 AB_{1}, 2014 AC_{1}, 2014 AD_{1}... until 2014 AZ_{1}, and then was continued with 2014 AA_{2} the first item in the third cycle. With the beginning of a new half-month on 16 January 2014, the first letter changed to "B", and the series started with 2014 BA.
- An idiosyncrasy of this system is that the second letter is listed before the number, even though the second letter is considered "least-significant". This is in contrast to most of the world's numbering systems. This idiosyncrasy is not seen, however, in the so-called packed form (packed designation).
- A packed designation has no spaces. It may also use letters to codify for the designation's year and subscript number. It is frequently used in online and electronic documents. For example, the provisional designation 2007 TA_{418} is written as K07Tf8A in the packed form, where "K07" stands for the year 2007, and "f8" for the subscript number 418.
- 90377 Sedna, a large trans-Neptunian object, had the provisional designation 2003 VB_{12}, meaning it was identified in the first half of November 2003 (as indicated by the letter "V"), and that it was the 302nd object identified during that time, as 12 cycles of 25 letters give 300, and the letter "B" is the second position in the current cycle.
- Survey designations do not follow the rules for new-style provisional designations.
- For technical reasons, such as ASCII limitations, the numerical suffix is not always subscripted, but sometimes "flattened out", so that 1989 SG_{1} can also be written as 1989 SG1.
- A very busy half month was the second half of January 2015 (letter "B"), which saw a total of 15,502 new minor planet identifications as of November 2025. One of the last assignments in this period was 2015 BB_{620} and corresponds to the 15,502nd position in the sequence.

=== Effective numbering limit ===
Because of the limits of the #packed designation, which is the format used in databases, the number of provisional designations was effectively capped at 15,500 per half-month until 2025. This corresponded to an upper limit in the index of 619. January 2015 exceeded this limit; the last assignable designation was 2015 BZ_{619} (the 15,500th object). The Vera Rubin LSST was expected to find a quarter million minor planets in its most productive months, far beyond the capacity of the packed notation. The MPC therefore developed an extended packed notation, which has allowed them to assign higher provisional designations. The first provisional designations beyond the new limit were announced in November 2025: 2015 BA_{620} and 2015 BB_{620}.

=== Survey designations ===
Minor planets discovered during the Palomar–Leiden survey and three subsequent Trojan-campaigns, which altogether discovered more than 4,000 asteroids and Jupiter trojans between 1960 and 1977, have custom designations that consist of a number (order in the survey) followed by a space and one of the following identifiers:

- P-L Palomar–Leiden survey (1960–1970)
- T-1 Palomar–Leiden Trojan survey (1971)
- T-2 Palomar–Leiden Trojan survey (1973)
- T-3 Palomar–Leiden Trojan survey (1977)

For example, the asteroid 6344 P-L is the 6344th minor planet in the original Palomar–Leiden survey, while the asteroid 4835 T-1 (now 20936 Nemrut Dagi) was discovered during the first Trojan-campaign. The majority of these bodies have since been assigned a number and many are already named.

=== Historical designations ===
The first four minor planets were discovered in the early 19th century, after which there was a lengthy gap before the discovery of the fifth. Astronomers initially had no reason to believe that there would be countless thousands of minor planets, and so assigned a planetary symbol to each new discovery, in the tradition of the symbols used for the major planets. For example, 1 Ceres was assigned a stylized sickle (⚳), 2 Pallas a stylized lance or spear (⚴), 3 Juno a scepter (⚵), and 4 Vesta an altar with a sacred fire. All had various graphic forms, some of considerable complexity.

It soon became apparent, though, that continuing to assign pictorial symbols was impractical when the number of known minor planets was in the dozens. Johann Franz Encke introduced a new system in the Berliner Astronomisches Jahrbuch (BAJ) for 1854, published in 1851, in which he used numbered planetary disks as symbols. Encke's system began the numbering with Astraea, which was given the numbered symbol ①, and went through Eunomia with ⑪, while Ceres, Pallas, Juno and Vesta continued to be denoted by the original symbols ⚳ ⚴ ⚵, but in the following year's BAJ, the numbering was reset to start with Ceres, so that Astraea's symbol was changed to ⑤.

The new system found popularity among astronomers, and since then, the permanent designation of a minor planet is a number indicating its order of discovery. Even after the adoption of this system, though, several more minor planets received pictorial symbols, including for 28 Bellona (the morning star and lance of Mars's martial sister); for 35 Leukothea (an ancient lighthouse); and for 37 Fides (a Latin cross). (See Astronomical_symbols#Asteroid_table for more.)

134340 Pluto is an exception: it received a graphical symbol with significant astronomical use (♇), because it was considered a major planet upon discovery, and did not receive a minor-planet number until 2006.

Graphical symbols continue to be used for some minor planets, and assigned for some recently discovered larger ones, mostly by astrologers (see astronomical symbol and astrological symbol). Three centaurs – 2060 Chiron, 5145 Pholus, and 7066 Nessus – and the largest trans-Neptunian objects – 50000 Quaoar, 90377 Sedna, 90482 Orcus, 136108 Haumea, 136199 Eris, 136472 Makemake, and 225088 Gonggong – have relatively standard symbols among astrologers: the symbols for Haumea, Makemake, and Eris have even been occasionally used in astronomy. However, such symbols are generally not in use among astronomers.

=== Genesis of the current system ===
Several different notation and symbolic schemes were used during the latter half of the nineteenth century, but the present form first appeared in the journal Astronomische Nachrichten (AN) in 1892. New numbers were assigned by the AN on receipt of a discovery announcement, and a permanent designation was then assigned once an orbit had been calculated for the new object.

At first, the provisional designation consisted of the year of discovery followed by a letter indicating the sequence of the discovery, but omitting the letter I (historically, sometimes J was omitted instead). Under this scheme, 333 Badenia was initially designated 1892 A, 163 Erigone was 1892 B, etc. In 1893, though, increasing numbers of discoveries forced the revision of the system to use double letters instead, in the sequence AA, AB... AZ, BA and so on. The sequence of double letters was not restarted each year, so that 1894 AQ followed 1893 AP and so on. In 1916, the letters reached ZZ and, rather than starting a series of triple-letter designations, the double-letter series was restarted with 1916 AA.

Because a considerable amount of time could sometimes elapse between exposing the photographic plates of an astronomical survey and actually spotting a small Solar System object on them (witness the story of Phoebe's discovery), or even between the actual discovery and the delivery of the message (from some far-flung observatory) to the central authority, it became necessary to retrofit discoveries into the sequence — to this day, discoveries are still dated based on when the images were taken, and not on when a human realised they were looking at something new. In the double-letter scheme, this was not generally possible once designations had been assigned in a subsequent year. The scheme used to get around this problem was rather clumsy and used a designation consisting of the year and a lower-case letter in a manner similar to the old provisional-designation scheme for comets. For example, 1915 a (note that there is a space between the year and the letter to distinguish this designation from the old-style comet designation 1915a, Mellish's first comet of 1915), 1917 b. In 1914 designations of the form year plus Greek letter were used in addition.

=== Temporary minor planet designations ===
Temporary designations are custom designations given by an observer or discovering observatory prior to the assignment of a provisional designation by the MPC. These intricate designations were used prior to the Digital Age, when communication was slow or even impossible (e.g. during WWI). The listed temporary designations by observatory or observer use uppercase and lowercase letters (LETTER, letter), digits, numbers and years, as well Roman numerals (ROM) and Greek letters (greek).

Observatory	Temp. designation	Examples
Algiers Obs.	Alger LETTER	Alger A, Alger CM
Algiers Obs.	Alg LETTER	Alg A, Alg CM
Alma-Ata	Alma-Ata [Nr.] number	Alma-Ata Nr. 1
Alma-Ata	year A number	1952 A1, A1
Arequipa	Arequipa letter	Arequipa a
Arequipa	Areq letter	Areq a
Arequipa	Arequipa number	Arequipa 17
Arequipa	Areq number	Areq 17
Belgrade Obs.	year letter [(Beograd)]	1956 x (Beograd), 1956 x
Belgrade Obs.	letter	x
Lowell Obs. (Flagstaff)	A number	A0, A7
Heidelberg Obs. (director Max Wolf)	Wolf [Nr.] number	Wolf Nr. 18, Wolf 18
Heidelberg Obs. (director Max Wolf)	Wolf letter	Wolf u
Heidelberg Obs. (director Max Wolf)	Wolf greek	Wolf alpha
Heidelberg Obs. (director Max Wolf)	Heid number	Heid 1, Heid 234
Johannesburg Obs.	LETTER	A, E
Johannesburg Obs.	G number	G 1, G 21
Johannesburg Obs.	T number	T 9, T 16
Kyoto-Kwasan	number	1, 6
Kyoto-Kwasan	letter	d
La Plata Obs.	[La Plata] year ROM	La Plata 1951 I, 1951 I
La Plata Obs.	[La Plata] year LETTER	La Plata 1950 G, 1950 G
Lick	[Asteroid] LETTER	Asteroid B, B
Mount Wilson Obs.	[Asteroid] LETTER	Asteroid A, A
Mount Wilson Obs.	LETTER	D
Purple Mountain Obs. (Nanking)	P.O. number	P.O. 32, P.O. 189
Purple Mountain Obs. (Nanking)	PO number	PO 32, PO 189
Crimean Astrophysical Obs. (Nauchnij)	N number	N1
Crimean Astrophysical Obs. (Nauchnij)	K number	K1, K3423
Simeiz Obs.	[1942] SIGMA K number	1942 SIGMA K1, SIGMA K1
Simeiz Obs.	[1942] SIG K number	1942 SIG K1, SIG K1
Simeiz Obs.	sigma number	sigma 1, sigma 229
Taunton Obs.	Taunton digit	Taunton 83
Tokyo-Mitaka	Tokyo LETTER	Tokyo B
Tokyo-Mitaka	Tokyo letter	Tokyo b
Tokyo-Mitaka	Tokyo number	Tokyo 20
Tokyo-Mitaka	Tokyo year LETTER	Tokyo 1954 D
Turku Obs.	T- number	T-1, T-774
Uccle Obs.	letter [(Uccle)]	p (Uccle), p
Uccle Obs.	letter number [(Uccle)]	x2 (Uccle), x2
Uccle Obs.	[ year] U number	1945 U 12, U 12
Washington	year W digit	1917 W 15, 1923 W 21
Yerkes Obs.	Y.O. number	Y.O. 23
Yerkes Obs.	YO number	YO 23

=== Traces in the permanent name ===
In some cases the provisional designation may carry over into the permanent name. For example, the asteroid 572 Rebekka had had the provisional designation 1905 RB, and similarly with the subsequently numbered asteroids 573 Recha (1905 RC), 574 Reginhild (1905 RD), 575 Renate (1905 RE), 577 Rhea (1905 RH), 579 Sidonia (1905 SD) and 580 Selene (1905 SE). This pattern appeared sporadically over the next few years' discoveries up to 769 Tatjana (1913 TA; see Meanings of minor-planet names: 1–1000) and occasionally later. In 2025 it appeared again when the IAU named the largest unnamed numbered trans-Neptunian objects 208996 Achlys (2003 AZ_{84}), 55565 Aya (2002 AW_{197}), 90568 Goibniu (2004 GV_{9}), 307261 Máni (2002 MS_{4}), 145452 Ritona (2005 RN_{43}), 145451 Rumina (2005 RM_{43}), 55637 Uni (2002 UX_{25}) and 78799 Xewioso (2002 XW_{93}).

There are hundreds if not thousands of such names. In recent years, the index sometimes plays a role, typically commemorating an anniversary date. Just among objects named by the Catalina Sky Survey in 2025, there are 22955 Tibees = 1999 TH_{251}, named after Toby Hendy; 147745 Novemberkelly = 2005 NK_{67}, after podcaster November Kelly; 175397 Oumousangaré = 2006 OS_{6}, after Oumou Sangaré; 180932 Luciegreen = 2005 LG_{31}, after Lucie Green; 227711 Dailyminorplanet = 2006 DP_{114}, after The Daily Minor Planet; 262825 Dianearbus = 2007 AD_{23}, after Diane Arbus and the year of her birth, 1923; 331298 Eunicefoote = 2011 EN_{19}, after Eunice Newton Foote (born 1819); 346666 Knorozov = 2008 YK_{22}, after Yuri Knorozov (born 1922); 412536 Farquharson = 2014 MF_{46}, after Marian Farquharson (born 1846); 426524 Rainerhannig = 2013 RH_{52}, after Rainer Hannig (born 1952); and 543061 Ruthsager = 2013 RS_{97}, after Ruth Sager (died 1997). Also among names proposed by the Catalina Sky Survey and accepted that year, there is 508440 Lewishamilton = 2016 LH_{7} after Lewis Hamilton, where the digit commemorates him being a seven-time Formula One world champion, and 17944 Lansbury = 1999 JF_{7}, after Angela Lansbury, where the provisional designation connects her to the character she played on television, Jessica Fletcher. A particularly indirect example is 284054 Keeling = 2005 CO_{2}, where the provisional designation is the chemical formula of carbon dioxide, and the object is named after Charles Keeling, who developed the first reliable instrument for measuring atmospheric carbon dioxide and who died in 2005, the year in the provisional designation.

== Comets ==
The system used for comets was complex previous to 1995. Originally, the year was followed by a space and then a Roman numeral (indicating the sequence of discovery) in most cases, but difficulties always arose when an object needed to be placed between previous discoveries. For example, after Comet 1881 III and Comet 1881 IV might be reported, an object discovered in between the discovery dates but reported much later could not be designated "Comet 1881 III1/2". More commonly comets were known by the discoverer's name and the year. An alternate scheme also listed comets in order of time of perihelion passage, using lower-case letters; thus "Comet Faye" (modern designation 4P/Faye) was both Comet 1881 I (first comet to pass perihelion in 1881) and Comet 1880c (third comet to be discovered in 1880).

The system since 1995 is similar to the provisional designation of minor planets. For comets, the provisional designation consists of the year of discovery, a space, one letter (unlike the minor planets with two) indicating the half-month of discovery within that year (A=first half of January, B=second half of January, etc. skipping I (to avoid confusion with the number 1 or the numeral I) and not reaching Z), and finally a number (not subscripted as with minor planets), indicating the sequence of discovery within the half-month. Thus, the eighth comet discovered in the second half of March 2006 would be given the provisional designation 2006 F8, whilst the tenth comet of late March would be 2006 F10.

If a comet splits, its segments are given the same provisional designation with a suffixed letter A, B, C, ..., Z, AA, AB, AC...

If an object is originally found asteroidal, and later develops a cometary tail, it retains its asteroidal designation. For example, minor planet 1954 PC turned out to be Comet Faye, and we thus have "4P/1954 PC" as one of the designations of said comet. Similarly, minor planet 1999 RE70 was reclassified as a comet, and because it was discovered by LINEAR, it is now known as 176P/LINEAR (LINEAR 52) and (118401) LINEAR.

Provisional designations for comets are given condensed or "packed form" in the same manner as minor planets. 2006 F8, if a periodic comet, would be listed in the IAU Minor Planet Database as PK06F080. The last character is purposely a zero, as that allows comet and minor planet designations not to overlap.

=== Periodic comets ===
Comets are assigned one of four possible prefixes as a rough classification. The prefix "P" (as in, for example, P/1997 C1, a.k.a. Comet Gehrels 4) designates a "periodic comet", one which has an orbital period of less than 200 years or which has been observed during more than a single perihelion passage (e.g. 153P/Ikeya–Zhang, whose period is 367 years). They receive a permanent number prefix after their second observed perihelion passage (see List of periodic comets).

=== Non-periodic comets ===
Comets which do not fulfill the "periodic" requirements receive the "C" prefix (e.g. C/2006 P1, the Great Comet of 2007). Comets initially labeled as "non-periodic" may, however, switch to "P" if they later fulfill the requirements.

Comets which have been lost or have disintegrated are prefixed "D" (e.g. D/1993 F2, Comet Shoemaker–Levy 9).

Finally, comets for which no reliable orbit could be calculated, but are known from historical records, are prefixed "X" as in, for example, X/1106 C1. (Also see List of non-periodic comets and List of hyperbolic comets.)

== Satellites and rings of planets ==
When satellites or rings are first discovered, they are given provisional designations such as "S/2000 J 11" (the 11th new satellite of Jupiter discovered in 2000), "S/2005 P 1" (the first new satellite of Pluto discovered in 2005), or "R/2004 S 2" (the second new ring of Saturn discovered in 2004). The initial "S/" or "R/" stands for "satellite" or "ring", respectively, distinguishing the designation from the prefixes "C/", "D/", "P/", and "X/" used for comets. These designations are sometimes written as "S/2005 P1", dropping the second space.

The prefix "S/" indicates a natural satellite, and is followed by a year (using the year when the discovery image was acquired, not necessarily the date of discovery). A one-letter code written in upper case identifies the planet such as J and S for Jupiter and Saturn, respectively (see list of one-letter abbreviations), and then a number identifies sequentially the observation. For example, Naiad, the innermost moon of Neptune, was at first designated "S/1989 N 6". Later, once its existence and orbit were confirmed, it received its full designation, "Neptune III Naiad".

The Roman numbering system arose with the very first discovery of natural satellites other than Earth's Moon: Galileo referred to the Galilean moons as I through IV (counting from Jupiter outward), in part to spite his rival Simon Marius, who had proposed the names now adopted. Similar numbering schemes naturally arose with the discovery of moons around Saturn and Uranus. Although the numbers initially designated the moons in orbital sequence, new discoveries soon failed to conform with this scheme (e.g. "Jupiter V" is Amalthea, which orbits closer to Jupiter than does Io). The unstated convention then became, at the close of the 19th century, that the numbers more or less reflected the order of discovery, except for prior historical exceptions (see the Timeline of discovery of Solar System planets and their natural satellites). The convention has been extended to natural satellites of minor planets, such as "(87) Sylvia I Romulus".

=== Moons of minor planets ===
Most minor-planet moons do not receive a provisional designation; they remain undesignated, like the moon of 38628 Huya. Provisional designations are only given when there are observations showing the satellite as a distinct entity separate from the primary. In those cases, the provisional designation system follows that established for the satellites of the major planets. With minor planets, the planet letter code is replaced by the minor planet number in parentheses. Thus, the first observed moon of 87 Sylvia, discovered in 2001, was at first designated S/2001 (87) 1, later receiving its permanent designation of (87) Sylvia I Romulus. Where more than one moon has been discovered, Roman numerals specify the discovery sequence, so that Sylvia's second moon is designated (87) Sylvia II Remus.

Since Pluto was reclassified in 2006, discoveries of Plutonian moons since then follow the minor-planet system: thus Nix and Hydra, discovered in 2005, were S/2005 P 2 and S/2005 P 1, but Kerberos and Styx, discovered in 2011 and 2012 respectively, were S/2011 (134340) 1 and S/2012 (134340) 1. That said, there has been some unofficial use of the formats "S/2011 P 1" and "S/2012 P 1".

== Packed designation ==
Packed designations are used in online and electronic documents as well as databases.

=== Packed minor planet designation ===
The Orbit Database (MPCORB) of the Minor Planet Center (MPC) uses the "packed form" to refer to all provisionally designated minor planets. The idiosyncrasy found in the new-style provisional designations no longer exists in this packed-notation system, as the second letter is now listed after the subscript number, or its equivalent 2-digit code. For an introduction on provisional minor planet designations in the "un-packed" form, see § New-style provisional designation.

=== Provisional packed designations ===
The system of packed provisional minor planet designations:

- uses exactly 7 characters with no spaces for all designations
- compacts 4 digit years to a 3-character code, e.g. 2014 is written as K14 (see tables below)
- converts all subscript numbers to a 2-character code (00 is used when there is no following subscript, 99 is used for subscript 99, A0 is used for subscript 100, and A1 is used for 101)
- the packed 2 character subscript code is placed between the half-month letter and the second (discovery order) letter (e.g. 2016 EK_{102} has discovery order K_{102} so the last three characters for its packed form are A2K)

Contrary to the new-style system, the letter "i" is used in the packed form both for the year and the numeric suffix. The compacting system provides upper and lowercase letters to encode up to 619 "cycles". This means that 15,500 designations ( = 619×25 + 25) within a half-month can be packed, which as of November 2025, only two objects have passed the limit: 2015 BA_{620} and 2015 BB_{620}.

The Minor Planet Center has extended the packed designation in preparation of the Vera C. Rubin Observatory, which is estimated to discover 250,000 objects will be discovered during its most productive months. With the new scheme, the 15,500th object and all prior ones will still have the usual packed designation (e.g. 2026 CZ_{619} will still be K26Cz9Z), but the 15,501st object and any following ones will have the new designation, in which the first character is a underscore, the second character is a letter symbolizing the last two digits of the year of discovery (starting with 2010 as A, and ending with 2035 as Z; the scheme is not expected to last until 2035 though), the third character being the half month, and the next four being the order of designation after 15,500, using characters from 0 to 9, A to Z, then a to z.

With this scheme, 2026 CA_{620} would be _QC0000, while the last designation possible for the first half of February would be 2026 CL_{591673} (the 14,791,836th object discovered in that half month), which would be _QCzzzz, but because of the large amount of objects needed to be discovered in one half-month to surpass this limit, this scheme appears to be sufficient. The only two objects that currently have this new designation are 2015 BA_{620} and 2015 BB_{620}, which are _FB0000 and _FB0001, respectively.

Examples

1. 1995 XA is written as J95X00A
2. 1995 XL_{1} is written as J95X01L
3. 2016 EK_{156} is written as K16EF6K
4. 2007 TA_{418} is written as K07Tf8A

Description

1. The year 1995 is compacted to J95. As it has no subscript number, 00 is used as placeholder instead, and directly placed after the half-month letter "X".
2. The year 1995 is compacted to J95. Subscript number "1" is padded to 01 to maintain the length of 7 characters, and placed after the first letter.
3. The year 2016 is compacted to K16. The subscript number "156" exceeds 2 digits and is converted to F6, (see table below)
4. The year 2007 is compacted to K07. The subscript number "418" exceeds 2 digits and is converted to f8, (see table below)

Conversion tables

Compacting first two digits of year
I	J	K	L	...
1800s	1900s	2000s	2100s	...

Compacting 3-digit subscript numbers
A	B	C	D	E	F	G	H	I	J	K	L	M	N	O	P	Q	R
100s	110s	120s	130s	140s	150s	160s	170s	180s	190s	200s	210s	220s	230s	240s	250s	260s	270s
S	T	U	V	W	X	Y	Z	a	b	c	d	e	f	g	h	i	j
280s	290s	300s	310s	320s	330s	340s	350s	360s	370s	380s	390s	400s	410s	420s	430s	440s	450s
k	l	m	n	o	p	q	r	s	t	u	v	w	x	y	z		
460s	470s	480s	490s	500s	510s	520s	530s	540s	550s	560s	570s	580s	590s	600s	610s		

Comets follow the minor-planet scheme for their first four characters. The fifth and sixth characters encode the number. The seventh character is usually 0, unless it is a component of a split comet, in which case it encodes in lowercase the letter of the fragment.

Examples

1. 1995 A1 is written as J95A010
2. 1995 P1-B is written as J95P01b (i.e. fragment B of comet 1995 P1)
3. 2088 A103 is written as K88AA30 (as the subscript number exceeds two digits and is converted according to the above table).

There is also an extended form that adds five characters to the front. The fifth character is one of "C", "D", "P", or "X", according to the status of the comet. If the comet is periodic, then the first four characters are the periodic-comet number (padded to the left with zeroes); otherwise, they are blank.

Natural satellites use the format for comets, except that the last column is always 0.

=== Packed survey designations ===
Survey designations used during the Palomar–Leiden Survey (PLS) have a simpler packed form, as for example:

- 6344 P-L is written as PLS6344
- 4835 T-1 is written as T1S4835
- 1010 T-2 is written as T2S1010
- 4101 T-3 is written as T3S4101

Note that the survey designations are distinguished from provisional designations by having the letter S in the third character, which contains a decimal digit in provisional designations and permanent numbers.

=== Permanent packed designations ===
A packed form for permanent designations also exists (these are numbered minor planets, with or without a name). In this case, only the designation's number is used and converted to a 5-character string. The rest of the permanent designation is ignored. Minor planet numbers below 100,000 are simply zero-padded to 5 digits from the left side. For minor planets between 100,000 and 619,999 inclusive, a single letter (A–Z and a–z) is used, similar as for the provisional subscript number (also see table above):

- A covers the number range 100,000–109,999
- B covers the number range 110,000–119,999
- a covers the number range 360,000–369,999
- z covers the number range 610,000–619,999

Examples

- 00001 encodes 1 Ceres
- 99999 encodes (99999) 1981 FP
- A0000 encodes 100000 Astronautica (as A0= 100K)
- A9999 encodes (109999) 2001 SZ_{62} (as A9= 109K)
- B0000 encodes (110000) 2001 SM_{63} (as B0= 110K)
- G3693 encodes 163693 Atira (as G3= 163K)
- Y2843 encodes 342843 Davidbowie (as Y2= 342K)
- g0356 encodes 420356 Praamžius (as g0= 420K)
- z9999 encodes (619999) 2006 UP_{363} (as z9= 619K)

For minor planets numbered 620,000 or higher, a tilde "~" is used as the first character. The subsequent 4 characters encoded in Base62 (using 0–9, then A–Z, and a–z, in this specific order) are used to store the difference of the object's number minus 620,000. This extended system allows for the encoding of more than 15 million minor planet numbers. For example:

- (620000) 2019 YS_{4} is represented as ~0000
  620,000 − 620,000 = 0 = 0 × 62^{3} + 0 × 62^{2} + 0 × 62^{1} + 0 × 62^{0}
- (620061) 2006 UB_{64} is represented as ~000z
  620,061 − 620,000 = 61 = 0 × 62^{3} + 0 × 62^{2} + 0 × 62^{1} + 61 × 62^{0}
- (3140113) will be represented as ~AZaz
  3,140,113 − 620,000 = 2,520,113 = 10 × 62^{3} + 35 × 62^{2} + 36 × 62^{1} + 61 × 62^{0}
- (15396335) will be represented as ~zzzz
  15,396,335 − 620,000 = 14,776,335 = 61 × 62^{3} + 61 × 62^{2} + 61 × 62^{1} + 61 × 62^{0}

For comets, permanent designations only apply to periodic comets that are seen to return. The first four characters are the number of the comet (left-padded with zeroes). The fifth character is "P", unless the periodic comet is lost or defunct, in which case it is "D".

For natural satellites, permanent packed designations take the form of the planet letter, then three digits containing the converted Roman numeral (left-padded with zeroes), and finally an "S". For example, Jupiter XIII Leda is J013S, and Neptune II Nereid is N002S.

== See also ==
- Minor-planet designation
- Naming of moons
