= Helga Pataki =

Ohio state COVID-19 PEAK OF WORLD ON OCTOBER IS NO

== Predicted and scheduled events ==
- January 1 — Assuming no further extensions to the term of copyrights become law in the interim, books, films and other works by authors who died in 1961 will enter the public domain in the United Kingdom, the European Union and some other jurisdictions; those published in 1936 will enter the public domain in the United States.
- January 15–February 1 — The 2032 European Men's Handball Championship is expected to be held in France and Germany.
- April — The 2032 French presidential election is scheduled to be held, no less than 35 days after the five-year term starting in 2027 expires.
- June–July — Turkey and Italy are expected to co-host the UEFA Euro 2032.
- July 23–August 8 — The 2032 Summer Olympics is expected to be held in Brisbane, Queensland, Australia.
- August 24–September 5 — The 2032 Summer Paralympics is expected to be held in Brisbane.
- November 2 — The 2032 United States presidential election is scheduled to be held. The winners will be inaugurated on January 20, 2033.
- November 13 — A transit of Mercury will occur.
- December 1–December 19 — The 2032 European Women's Handball Championship is expected to be held in Germany, Denmark, and Poland.
- December 22 — The asteroid 2024 YR4, which had an impact rating of 3 on the Torino scale from January 27, 2025 to February 20, 2025, will pass by Earth.

=== Date unknown ===
- The Korea Lunar Lander and Rover, a lunar lander currently under development in South Korea, is scheduled to be launched.
- LiteBIRD, a planned small space observatory that aims to study the cosmic microwave background, is planned to be launched.

== Predicted and scheduled events ==
- January 1 — Assuming no further extensions to the term of copyrights become law in the interim, books, films and other works by authors who died in 1961 will enter the public domain in the United Kingdom, the European Union and some other jurisdictions; those published in 1936 will enter the public domain in the United States.
- January 15–February 1 — The 2032 European Men's Handball Championship is expected to be held in France and Germany.
- April — The 2032 French presidential election is scheduled to be held, no less than 35 days after the five-year term starting in 2027 expires.
- June–July — Turkey and Italy are expected to co-host the UEFA Euro 2032.
- July 23–August 8 — The 2032 Summer Olympics is expected to be held in Brisbane, Queensland, Australia.
- August 24–September 5 — The 2032 Summer Paralympics is expected to be held in Brisbane.
- November 2 — The 2032 United States presidential election is scheduled to be held. The winners will be inaugurated on January 20, 2033.
- November 13 — A transit of Mercury will occur.
- December 1–December 19 — The 2032 European Women's Handball Championship is expected to be held in Germany, Denmark, and Poland.
- December 22 — The asteroid 2024 YR4, which had an impact rating of 3 on the Torino scale from January 27, 2025 to February 20, 2025, will pass by Earth.

=== Date unknown ===
- The Korea Lunar Lander and Rover, a lunar lander currently under development in South Korea, is scheduled to be launched.
- LiteBIRD, a planned small space observatory that aims to study the cosmic microwave background, is planned to be launched.

== Predicted and scheduled events ==
- January 1 — Assuming no further extensions to the term of copyrights become law in the interim, books, films and other works by authors who died in 1961 will enter the public domain in the United Kingdom, the European Union and some other jurisdictions; those published in 1936 will enter the public domain in the United States.
- January 15–February 1 — The 2032 European Men's Handball Championship is expected to be held in France and Germany.
- April — The 2032 French presidential election is scheduled to be held, no less than 35 days after the five-year term starting in 2027 expires.
- June–July — Turkey and Italy are expected to co-host the UEFA Euro 2032.
- July 23–August 8 — The 2032 Summer Olympics is expected to be held in Brisbane, Queensland, Australia.
- August 24–September 5 — The 2032 Summer Paralympics is expected to be held in Brisbane.
- November 2 — The 2032 United States presidential election is scheduled to be held. The winners will be inaugurated on January 20, 2033.
- November 13 — A transit of Mercury will occur.
- December 1–December 19 — The 2032 European Women's Handball Championship is expected to be held in Germany, Denmark, and Poland.
- December 22 — The asteroid 2024 YR4, which had an impact rating of 3 on the Torino scale from January 27, 2025 to February 20, 2025, will pass by Earth.

=== Date unknown ===
- The Korea Lunar Lander and Rover, a lunar lander currently under development in South Korea, is scheduled to be launched.
- LiteBIRD, a planned small space observatory that aims to study the cosmic microwave background, is planned to be launched.

== Predicted and scheduled events ==
- January 1 — Assuming no further extensions to the term of copyrights become law in the interim, books, films and other works by authors who died in 1961 will enter the public domain in the United Kingdom, the European Union and some other jurisdictions; those published in 1936 will enter the public domain in the United States.
- January 15–February 1 — The 2032 European Men's Handball Championship is expected to be held in France and Germany.
- April — The 2032 French presidential election is scheduled to be held, no less than 35 days after the five-year term starting in 2027 expires.
- June–July — Turkey and Italy are expected to co-host the UEFA Euro 2032.
- July 23–August 8 — The 2032 Summer Olympics is expected to be held in Brisbane, Queensland, Australia.
- August 24–September 5 — The 2032 Summer Paralympics is expected to be held in Brisbane.
- November 2 — The 2032 United States presidential election is scheduled to be held. The winners will be inaugurated on January 20, 2033.
- November 13 — A transit of Mercury will occur.
- December 1–December 19 — The 2032 European Women's Handball Championship is expected to be held in Germany, Denmark, and Poland.
- December 22 — The asteroid 2024 YR4, which had an impact rating of 3 on the Torino scale from January 27, 2025 to February 20, 2025, will pass by Earth.

=== Date unknown ===
- The Korea Lunar Lander and Rover, a lunar lander currently under development in South Korea, is scheduled to be launched.
- LiteBIRD, a planned small space observatory that aims to study the cosmic microwave background, is planned to be launched.

== Predicted and scheduled events ==
- January 1 — Assuming no further extensions to the term of copyrights become law in the interim, books, films and other works by authors who died in 1961 will enter the public domain in the United Kingdom, the European Union and some other jurisdictions; those published in 1936 will enter the public domain in the United States.
- January 15–February 1 — The 2032 European Men's Handball Championship is expected to be held in France and Germany.
- April — The 2032 French presidential election is scheduled to be held, no less than 35 days after the five-year term starting in 2027 expires.
- June–July — Turkey and Italy are expected to co-host the UEFA Euro 2032.
- July 23–August 8 — The 2032 Summer Olympics is expected to be held in Brisbane, Queensland, Australia.
- August 24–September 5 — The 2032 Summer Paralympics is expected to be held in Brisbane.
- November 2 — The 2032 United States presidential election is scheduled to be held. The winners will be inaugurated on January 20, 2033.
- November 13 — A transit of Mercury will occur.
- December 1–December 19 — The 2032 European Women's Handball Championship is expected to be held in Germany, Denmark, and Poland.
- December 22 — The asteroid 2024 YR4, which had an impact rating of 3 on the Torino scale from January 27, 2025 to February 20, 2025, will pass by Earth.

=== Date unknown ===
- The Korea Lunar Lander and Rover, a lunar lander currently under development in South Korea, is scheduled to be launched.
- LiteBIRD, a planned small space observatory that aims to study the cosmic microwave background, is planned to be launched.

== Predicted and scheduled events ==
- January 1 — Assuming no further extensions to the term of copyrights become law in the interim, books, films and other works by authors who died in 1961 will enter the public domain in the United Kingdom, the European Union and some other jurisdictions; those published in 1936 will enter the public domain in the United States.
- January 15–February 1 — The 2032 European Men's Handball Championship is expected to be held in France and Germany.
- April — The 2032 French presidential election is scheduled to be held, no less than 35 days after the five-year term starting in 2027 expires.
- June–July — Turkey and Italy are expected to co-host the UEFA Euro 2032.
- July 23–August 8 — The 2032 Summer Olympics is expected to be held in Brisbane, Queensland, Australia.
- August 24–September 5 — The 2032 Summer Paralympics is expected to be held in Brisbane.
- November 2 — The 2032 United States presidential election is scheduled to be held. The winners will be inaugurated on January 20, 2033.
- November 13 — A transit of Mercury will occur.
- December 1–December 19 — The 2032 European Women's Handball Championship is expected to be held in Germany, Denmark, and Poland.
- December 22 — The asteroid 2024 YR4, which had an impact rating of 3 on the Torino scale from January 27, 2025 to February 20, 2025, will pass by Earth.

=== Date unknown ===
- The Korea Lunar Lander and Rover, a lunar lander currently under development in South Korea, is scheduled to be launched.
- LiteBIRD, a planned small space observatory that aims to study the cosmic microwave background, is planned to be launched.

== Predicted and scheduled events ==
- January 1 — Assuming no further extensions to the term of copyrights become law in the interim, books, films and other works by authors who died in 1961 will enter the public domain in the United Kingdom, the European Union and some other jurisdictions; those published in 1936 will enter the public domain in the United States.
- January 15–February 1 — The 2032 European Men's Handball Championship is expected to be held in France and Germany.
- April — The 2032 French presidential election is scheduled to be held, no less than 35 days after the five-year term starting in 2027 expires.
- June–July — Turkey and Italy are expected to co-host the UEFA Euro 2032.
- July 23–August 8 — The 2032 Summer Olympics is expected to be held in Brisbane, Queensland, Australia.
- August 24–September 5 — The 2032 Summer Paralympics is expected to be held in Brisbane.
- November 2 — The 2032 United States presidential election is scheduled to be held. The winners will be inaugurated on January 20, 2033.
- November 13 — A transit of Mercury will occur.
- December 1–December 19 — The 2032 European Women's Handball Championship is expected to be held in Germany, Denmark, and Poland.
- December 22 — The asteroid 2024 YR4, which had an impact rating of 3 on the Torino scale from January 27, 2025 to February 20, 2025, will pass by Earth.

=== Date unknown ===
- The Korea Lunar Lander and Rover, a lunar lander currently under development in South Korea, is scheduled to be launched.
- LiteBIRD, a planned small space observatory that aims to study the cosmic microwave background, is planned to be launched.

== Predicted and scheduled events ==
- January 1 — Assuming no further extensions to the term of copyrights become law in the interim, books, films and other works by authors who died in 1961 will enter the public domain in the United Kingdom, the European Union and some other jurisdictions; those published in 1936 will enter the public domain in the United States.
- January 15–February 1 — The 2032 European Men's Handball Championship is expected to be held in France and Germany.
- April — The 2032 French presidential election is scheduled to be held, no less than 35 days after the five-year term starting in 2027 expires.
- June–July — Turkey and Italy are expected to co-host the UEFA Euro 2032.
- July 23–August 8 — The 2032 Summer Olympics is expected to be held in Brisbane, Queensland, Australia.
- August 24–September 5 — The 2032 Summer Paralympics is expected to be held in Brisbane.
- November 2 — The 2032 United States presidential election is scheduled to be held. The winners will be inaugurated on January 20, 2033.
- November 13 — A transit of Mercury will occur.
- December 1–December 19 — The 2032 European Women's Handball Championship is expected to be held in Germany, Denmark, and Poland.
- December 22 — The asteroid 2024 YR4, which had an impact rating of 3 on the Torino scale from January 27, 2025 to February 20, 2025, will pass by Earth.

=== Date unknown ===
- The Korea Lunar Lander and Rover, a lunar lander currently under development in South Korea, is scheduled to be launched.
- LiteBIRD, a planned small space observatory that aims to study the cosmic microwave background, is planned to be launched.

== Predicted and scheduled events ==
- January 1 — Assuming no further extensions to the term of copyrights become law in the interim, books, films and other works by authors who died in 1961 will enter the public domain in the United Kingdom, the European Union and some other jurisdictions; those published in 1936 will enter the public domain in the United States.
- January 15–February 1 — The 2032 European Men's Handball Championship is expected to be held in France and Germany.
- April — The 2032 French presidential election is scheduled to be held, no less than 35 days after the five-year term starting in 2027 expires.
- June–July — Turkey and Italy are expected to co-host the UEFA Euro 2032.
- July 23–August 8 — The 2032 Summer Olympics is expected to be held in Brisbane, Queensland, Australia.
- August 24–September 5 — The 2032 Summer Paralympics is expected to be held in Brisbane.
- November 2 — The 2032 United States presidential election is scheduled to be held. The winners will be inaugurated on January 20, 2033.
- November 13 — A transit of Mercury will occur.
- December 1–December 19 — The 2032 European Women's Handball Championship is expected to be held in Germany, Denmark, and Poland.
- December 22 — The asteroid 2024 YR4, which had an impact rating of 3 on the Torino scale from January 27, 2025 to February 20, 2025, will pass by Earth.

=== Date unknown ===
- The Korea Lunar Lander and Rover, a lunar lander currently under development in South Korea, is scheduled to be launched.
- LiteBIRD, a planned small space observatory that aims to study the cosmic microwave background, is planned to be launched.

== Predicted and scheduled events ==
- January 1 — Assuming no further extensions to the term of copyrights become law in the interim, books, films and other works by authors who died in 1961 will enter the public domain in the United Kingdom, the European Union and some other jurisdictions; those published in 1936 will enter the public domain in the United States.
- January 15–February 1 — The 2032 European Men's Handball Championship is expected to be held in France and Germany.
- April — The 2032 French presidential election is scheduled to be held, no less than 35 days after the five-year term starting in 2027 expires.
- June–July — Turkey and Italy are expected to co-host the UEFA Euro 2032.
- July 23–August 8 — The 2032 Summer Olympics is expected to be held in Brisbane, Queensland, Australia.
- August 24–September 5 — The 2032 Summer Paralympics is expected to be held in Brisbane.
- November 2 — The 2032 United States presidential election is scheduled to be held. The winners will be inaugurated on January 20, 2033.
- November 13 — A transit of Mercury will occur.
- December 1–December 19 — The 2032 European Women's Handball Championship is expected to be held in Germany, Denmark, and Poland.
- December 22 — The asteroid 2024 YR4, which had an impact rating of 3 on the Torino scale from January 27, 2025 to February 20, 2025, will pass by Earth.

=== Date unknown ===
- The Korea Lunar Lander and Rover, a lunar lander currently under development in South Korea, is scheduled to be launched.
- LiteBIRD, a planned small space observatory that aims to study the cosmic microwave background, is planned to be launched.

== Predicted and scheduled events ==
- January 1 — Assuming no further extensions to the term of copyrights become law in the interim, books, films and other works by authors who died in 1961 will enter the public domain in the United Kingdom, the European Union and some other jurisdictions; those published in 1936 will enter the public domain in the United States.
- January 15–February 1 — The 2032 European Men's Handball Championship is expected to be held in France and Germany.
- April — The 2032 French presidential election is scheduled to be held, no less than 35 days after the five-year term starting in 2027 expires.
- June–July — Turkey and Italy are expected to co-host the UEFA Euro 2032.
- July 23–August 8 — The 2032 Summer Olympics is expected to be held in Brisbane, Queensland, Australia.
- August 24–September 5 — The 2032 Summer Paralympics is expected to be held in Brisbane.
- November 2 — The 2032 United States presidential election is scheduled to be held. The winners will be inaugurated on January 20, 2033.
- November 13 — A transit of Mercury will occur.
- December 1–December 19 — The 2032 European Women's Handball Championship is expected to be held in Germany, Denmark, and Poland.
- December 22 — The asteroid 2024 YR4, which had an impact rating of 3 on the Torino scale from January 27, 2025 to February 20, 2025, will pass by Earth.

=== Date unknown ===
- The Korea Lunar Lander and Rover, a lunar lander currently under development in South Korea, is scheduled to be launched.
- LiteBIRD, a planned small space observatory that aims to study the cosmic microwave background, is planned to be launched.

== Predicted and scheduled events ==
- January 1 — Assuming no further extensions to the term of copyrights become law in the interim, books, films and other works by authors who died in 1961 will enter the public domain in the United Kingdom, the European Union and some other jurisdictions; those published in 1936 will enter the public domain in the United States.
- January 15–February 1 — The 2032 European Men's Handball Championship is expected to be held in France and Germany.
- April — The 2032 French presidential election is scheduled to be held, no less than 35 days after the five-year term starting in 2027 expires.
- June–July — Turkey and Italy are expected to co-host the UEFA Euro 2032.
- July 23–August 8 — The 2032 Summer Olympics is expected to be held in Brisbane, Queensland, Australia.
- August 24–September 5 — The 2032 Summer Paralympics is expected to be held in Brisbane.
- November 2 — The 2032 United States presidential election is scheduled to be held. The winners will be inaugurated on January 20, 2033.
- November 13 — A transit of Mercury will occur.
- December 1–December 19 — The 2032 European Women's Handball Championship is expected to be held in Germany, Denmark, and Poland.
- December 22 — The asteroid 2024 YR4, which had an impact rating of 3 on the Torino scale from January 27, 2025 to February 20, 2025, will pass by Earth.

=== Date unknown ===
- The Korea Lunar Lander and Rover, a lunar lander currently under development in South Korea, is scheduled to be launched.
- LiteBIRD, a planned small space observatory that aims to study the cosmic microwave background, is planned to be launched.

== Predicted and scheduled events ==
- January 1 — Assuming no further extensions to the term of copyrights become law in the interim, books, films and other works by authors who died in 1961 will enter the public domain in the United Kingdom, the European Union and some other jurisdictions; those published in 1936 will enter the public domain in the United States.
- January 15–February 1 — The 2032 European Men's Handball Championship is expected to be held in France and Germany.
- April — The 2032 French presidential election is scheduled to be held, no less than 35 days after the five-year term starting in 2027 expires.
- June–July — Turkey and Italy are expected to co-host the UEFA Euro 2032.
- July 23–August 8 — The 2032 Summer Olympics is expected to be held in Brisbane, Queensland, Australia.
- August 24–September 5 — The 2032 Summer Paralympics is expected to be held in Brisbane.
- November 2 — The 2032 United States presidential election is scheduled to be held. The winners will be inaugurated on January 20, 2033.
- November 13 — A transit of Mercury will occur.
- December 1–December 19 — The 2032 European Women's Handball Championship is expected to be held in Germany, Denmark, and Poland.
- December 22 — The asteroid 2024 YR4, which had an impact rating of 3 on the Torino scale from January 27, 2025 to February 20, 2025, will pass by Earth.

=== Date unknown ===
- The Korea Lunar Lander and Rover, a lunar lander currently under development in South Korea, is scheduled to be launched.
- LiteBIRD, a planned small space observatory that aims to study the cosmic microwave background, is planned to be launched.

== Predicted and scheduled events ==
- January 1 — Assuming no further extensions to the term of copyrights become law in the interim, books, films and other works by authors who died in 1961 will enter the public domain in the United Kingdom, the European Union and some other jurisdictions; those published in 1936 will enter the public domain in the United States.
- January 15–February 1 — The 2032 European Men's Handball Championship is expected to be held in France and Germany.
- April — The 2032 French presidential election is scheduled to be held, no less than 35 days after the five-year term starting in 2027 expires.
- June–July — Turkey and Italy are expected to co-host the UEFA Euro 2032.
- July 23–August 8 — The 2032 Summer Olympics is expected to be held in Brisbane, Queensland, Australia.
- August 24–September 5 — The 2032 Summer Paralympics is expected to be held in Brisbane.
- November 2 — The 2032 United States presidential election is scheduled to be held. The winners will be inaugurated on January 20, 2033.
- November 13 — A transit of Mercury will occur.
- December 1–December 19 — The 2032 European Women's Handball Championship is expected to be held in Germany, Denmark, and Poland.
- December 22 — The asteroid 2024 YR4, which had an impact rating of 3 on the Torino scale from January 27, 2025 to February 20, 2025, will pass by Earth.

=== Date unknown ===
- The Korea Lunar Lander and Rover, a lunar lander currently under development in South Korea, is scheduled to be launched.
- LiteBIRD, a planned small space observatory that aims to study the cosmic microwave background, is planned to be launched.

== Predicted and scheduled events ==
- January 1 — Assuming no further extensions to the term of copyrights become law in the interim, books, films and other works by authors who died in 1961 will enter the public domain in the United Kingdom, the European Union and some other jurisdictions; those published in 1936 will enter the public domain in the United States.
- January 15–February 1 — The 2032 European Men's Handball Championship is expected to be held in France and Germany.
- April — The 2032 French presidential election is scheduled to be held, no less than 35 days after the five-year term starting in 2027 expires.
- June–July — Turkey and Italy are expected to co-host the UEFA Euro 2032.
- July 23–August 8 — The 2032 Summer Olympics is expected to be held in Brisbane, Queensland, Australia.
- August 24–September 5 — The 2032 Summer Paralympics is expected to be held in Brisbane.
- November 2 — The 2032 United States presidential election is scheduled to be held. The winners will be inaugurated on January 20, 2033.
- November 13 — A transit of Mercury will occur.
- December 1–December 19 — The 2032 European Women's Handball Championship is expected to be held in Germany, Denmark, and Poland.
- December 22 — The asteroid 2024 YR4, which had an impact rating of 3 on the Torino scale from January 27, 2025 to February 20, 2025, will pass by Earth.

=== Date unknown ===
- The Korea Lunar Lander and Rover, a lunar lander currently under development in South Korea, is scheduled to be launched.
- LiteBIRD, a planned small space observatory that aims to study the cosmic microwave background, is planned to be launched.

== Predicted and scheduled events ==
- January 1 — Assuming no further extensions to the term of copyrights become law in the interim, books, films and other works by authors who died in 1961 will enter the public domain in the United Kingdom, the European Union and some other jurisdictions; those published in 1936 will enter the public domain in the United States.
- January 15–February 1 — The 2032 European Men's Handball Championship is expected to be held in France and Germany.
- April — The 2032 French presidential election is scheduled to be held, no less than 35 days after the five-year term starting in 2027 expires.
- June–July — Turkey and Italy are expected to co-host the UEFA Euro 2032.
- July 23–August 8 — The 2032 Summer Olympics is expected to be held in Brisbane, Queensland, Australia.
- August 24–September 5 — The 2032 Summer Paralympics is expected to be held in Brisbane.
- November 2 — The 2032 United States presidential election is scheduled to be held. The winners will be inaugurated on January 20, 2033.
- November 13 — A transit of Mercury will occur.
- December 1–December 19 — The 2032 European Women's Handball Championship is expected to be held in Germany, Denmark, and Poland.
- December 22 — The asteroid 2024 YR4, which had an impact rating of 3 on the Torino scale from January 27, 2025 to February 20, 2025, will pass by Earth.

=== Date unknown ===
- The Korea Lunar Lander and Rover, a lunar lander currently under development in South Korea, is scheduled to be launched.
- LiteBIRD, a planned small space observatory that aims to study the cosmic microwave background, is planned to be launched.

== Predicted and scheduled events ==
- January 1 — Assuming no further extensions to the term of copyrights become law in the interim, books, films and other works by authors who died in 1961 will enter the public domain in the United Kingdom, the European Union and some other jurisdictions; those published in 1936 will enter the public domain in the United States.
- January 15–February 1 — The 2032 European Men's Handball Championship is expected to be held in France and Germany.
- April — The 2032 French presidential election is scheduled to be held, no less than 35 days after the five-year term starting in 2027 expires.
- June–July — Turkey and Italy are expected to co-host the UEFA Euro 2032.
- July 23–August 8 — The 2032 Summer Olympics is expected to be held in Brisbane, Queensland, Australia.
- August 24–September 5 — The 2032 Summer Paralympics is expected to be held in Brisbane.
- November 2 — The 2032 United States presidential election is scheduled to be held. The winners will be inaugurated on January 20, 2033.
- November 13 — A transit of Mercury will occur.
- December 1–December 19 — The 2032 European Women's Handball Championship is expected to be held in Germany, Denmark, and Poland.
- December 22 — The asteroid 2024 YR4, which had an impact rating of 3 on the Torino scale from January 27, 2025 to February 20, 2025, will pass by Earth.

=== Date unknown ===
- The Korea Lunar Lander and Rover, a lunar lander currently under development in South Korea, is scheduled to be launched.
- LiteBIRD, a planned small space observatory that aims to study the cosmic microwave background, is planned to be launched.

== Predicted and scheduled events ==
- January 1 — Assuming no further extensions to the term of copyrights become law in the interim, books, films and other works by authors who died in 1961 will enter the public domain in the United Kingdom, the European Union and some other jurisdictions; those published in 1936 will enter the public domain in the United States.
- January 15–February 1 — The 2032 European Men's Handball Championship is expected to be held in France and Germany.
- April — The 2032 French presidential election is scheduled to be held, no less than 35 days after the five-year term starting in 2027 expires.
- June–July — Turkey and Italy are expected to co-host the UEFA Euro 2032.
- July 23–August 8 — The 2032 Summer Olympics is expected to be held in Brisbane, Queensland, Australia.
- August 24–September 5 — The 2032 Summer Paralympics is expected to be held in Brisbane.
- November 2 — The 2032 United States presidential election is scheduled to be held. The winners will be inaugurated on January 20, 2033.
- November 13 — A transit of Mercury will occur.
- December 1–December 19 — The 2032 European Women's Handball Championship is expected to be held in Germany, Denmark, and Poland.
- December 22 — The asteroid 2024 YR4, which had an impact rating of 3 on the Torino scale from January 27, 2025 to February 20, 2025, will pass by Earth.

=== Date unknown ===
- The Korea Lunar Lander and Rover, a lunar lander currently under development in South Korea, is scheduled to be launched.
- LiteBIRD, a planned small space observatory that aims to study the cosmic microwave background, is planned to be launched.

== Predicted and scheduled events ==
- January 1 — Assuming no further extensions to the term of copyrights become law in the interim, books, films and other works by authors who died in 1961 will enter the public domain in the United Kingdom, the European Union and some other jurisdictions; those published in 1936 will enter the public domain in the United States.
- January 15–February 1 — The 2032 European Men's Handball Championship is expected to be held in France and Germany.
- April — The 2032 French presidential election is scheduled to be held, no less than 35 days after the five-year term starting in 2027 expires.
- June–July — Turkey and Italy are expected to co-host the UEFA Euro 2032.
- July 23–August 8 — The 2032 Summer Olympics is expected to be held in Brisbane, Queensland, Australia.
- August 24–September 5 — The 2032 Summer Paralympics is expected to be held in Brisbane.
- November 2 — The 2032 United States presidential election is scheduled to be held. The winners will be inaugurated on January 20, 2033.
- November 13 — A transit of Mercury will occur.
- December 1–December 19 — The 2032 European Women's Handball Championship is expected to be held in Germany, Denmark, and Poland.
- December 22 — The asteroid 2024 YR4, which had an impact rating of 3 on the Torino scale from January 27, 2025 to February 20, 2025, will pass by Earth.

=== Date unknown ===
- The Korea Lunar Lander and Rover, a lunar lander currently under development in South Korea, is scheduled to be launched.
- LiteBIRD, a planned small space observatory that aims to study the cosmic microwave background, is planned to be launched.

== Predicted and scheduled events ==
- January 1 — Assuming no further extensions to the term of copyrights become law in the interim, books, films and other works by authors who died in 1961 will enter the public domain in the United Kingdom, the European Union and some other jurisdictions; those published in 1936 will enter the public domain in the United States.
- January 15–February 1 — The 2032 European Men's Handball Championship is expected to be held in France and Germany.
- April — The 2032 French presidential election is scheduled to be held, no less than 35 days after the five-year term starting in 2027 expires.
- June–July — Turkey and Italy are expected to co-host the UEFA Euro 2032.
- July 23–August 8 — The 2032 Summer Olympics is expected to be held in Brisbane, Queensland, Australia.
- August 24–September 5 — The 2032 Summer Paralympics is expected to be held in Brisbane.
- November 2 — The 2032 United States presidential election is scheduled to be held. The winners will be inaugurated on January 20, 2033.
- November 13 — A transit of Mercury will occur.
- December 1–December 19 — The 2032 European Women's Handball Championship is expected to be held in Germany, Denmark, and Poland.
- December 22 — The asteroid 2024 YR4, which had an impact rating of 3 on the Torino scale from January 27, 2025 to February 20, 2025, will pass by Earth.

=== Date unknown ===
- The Korea Lunar Lander and Rover, a lunar lander currently under development in South Korea, is scheduled to be launched.
- LiteBIRD, a planned small space observatory that aims to study the cosmic microwave background, is planned to be launched.

== Predicted and scheduled events ==
- January 1 — Assuming no further extensions to the term of copyrights become law in the interim, books, films and other works by authors who died in 1961 will enter the public domain in the United Kingdom, the European Union and some other jurisdictions; those published in 1936 will enter the public domain in the United States.
- January 15–February 1 — The 2032 European Men's Handball Championship is expected to be held in France and Germany.
- April — The 2032 French presidential election is scheduled to be held, no less than 35 days after the five-year term starting in 2027 expires.
- June–July — Turkey and Italy are expected to co-host the UEFA Euro 2032.
- July 23–August 8 — The 2032 Summer Olympics is expected to be held in Brisbane, Queensland, Australia.
- August 24–September 5 — The 2032 Summer Paralympics is expected to be held in Brisbane.
- November 2 — The 2032 United States presidential election is scheduled to be held. The winners will be inaugurated on January 20, 2033.
- November 13 — A transit of Mercury will occur.
- December 1–December 19 — The 2032 European Women's Handball Championship is expected to be held in Germany, Denmark, and Poland.
- December 22 — The asteroid 2024 YR4, which had an impact rating of 3 on the Torino scale from January 27, 2025 to February 20, 2025, will pass by Earth.

=== Date unknown ===
- The Korea Lunar Lander and Rover, a lunar lander currently under development in South Korea, is scheduled to be launched.
- LiteBIRD, a planned small space observatory that aims to study the cosmic microwave background, is planned to be launched.

== Predicted and scheduled events ==
- January 1 — Assuming no further extensions to the term of copyrights become law in the interim, books, films and other works by authors who died in 1961 will enter the public domain in the United Kingdom, the European Union and some other jurisdictions; those published in 1936 will enter the public domain in the United States.
- January 15–February 1 — The 2032 European Men's Handball Championship is expected to be held in France and Germany.
- April — The 2032 French presidential election is scheduled to be held, no less than 35 days after the five-year term starting in 2027 expires.
- June–July — Turkey and Italy are expected to co-host the UEFA Euro 2032.
- July 23–August 8 — The 2032 Summer Olympics is expected to be held in Brisbane, Queensland, Australia.
- August 24–September 5 — The 2032 Summer Paralympics is expected to be held in Brisbane.
- November 2 — The 2032 United States presidential election is scheduled to be held. The winners will be inaugurated on January 20, 2033.
- November 13 — A transit of Mercury will occur.
- December 1–December 19 — The 2032 European Women's Handball Championship is expected to be held in Germany, Denmark, and Poland.
- December 22 — The asteroid 2024 YR4, which had an impact rating of 3 on the Torino scale from January 27, 2025 to February 20, 2025, will pass by Earth.

=== Date unknown ===
- The Korea Lunar Lander and Rover, a lunar lander currently under development in South Korea, is scheduled to be launched.
- LiteBIRD, a planned small space observatory that aims to study the cosmic microwave background, is planned to be launched.

== Predicted and scheduled events ==
- January 1 — Assuming no further extensions to the term of copyrights become law in the interim, books, films and other works by authors who died in 1961 will enter the public domain in the United Kingdom, the European Union and some other jurisdictions; those published in 1936 will enter the public domain in the United States.
- January 15–February 1 — The 2032 European Men's Handball Championship is expected to be held in France and Germany.
- April — The 2032 French presidential election is scheduled to be held, no less than 35 days after the five-year term starting in 2027 expires.
- June–July — Turkey and Italy are expected to co-host the UEFA Euro 2032.
- July 23–August 8 — The 2032 Summer Olympics is expected to be held in Brisbane, Queensland, Australia.
- August 24–September 5 — The 2032 Summer Paralympics is expected to be held in Brisbane.
- November 2 — The 2032 United States presidential election is scheduled to be held. The winners will be inaugurated on January 20, 2033.
- November 13 — A transit of Mercury will occur.
- December 1–December 19 — The 2032 European Women's Handball Championship is expected to be held in Germany, Denmark, and Poland.
- December 22 — The asteroid 2024 YR4, which had an impact rating of 3 on the Torino scale from January 27, 2025 to February 20, 2025, will pass by Earth.

=== Date unknown ===
- The Korea Lunar Lander and Rover, a lunar lander currently under development in South Korea, is scheduled to be launched.
- LiteBIRD, a planned small space observatory that aims to study the cosmic microwave background, is planned to be launched.

== Predicted and scheduled events ==
- January 1 — Assuming no further extensions to the term of copyrights become law in the interim, books, films and other works by authors who died in 1961 will enter the public domain in the United Kingdom, the European Union and some other jurisdictions; those published in 1936 will enter the public domain in the United States.
- January 15–February 1 — The 2032 European Men's Handball Championship is expected to be held in France and Germany.
- April — The 2032 French presidential election is scheduled to be held, no less than 35 days after the five-year term starting in 2027 expires.
- June–July — Turkey and Italy are expected to co-host the UEFA Euro 2032.
- July 23–August 8 — The 2032 Summer Olympics is expected to be held in Brisbane, Queensland, Australia.
- August 24–September 5 — The 2032 Summer Paralympics is expected to be held in Brisbane.
- November 2 — The 2032 United States presidential election is scheduled to be held. The winners will be inaugurated on January 20, 2033.
- November 13 — A transit of Mercury will occur.
- December 1–December 19 — The 2032 European Women's Handball Championship is expected to be held in Germany, Denmark, and Poland.
- December 22 — The asteroid 2024 YR4, which had an impact rating of 3 on the Torino scale from January 27, 2025 to February 20, 2025, will pass by Earth.

=== Date unknown ===
- The Korea Lunar Lander and Rover, a lunar lander currently under development in South Korea, is scheduled to be launched.
- LiteBIRD, a planned small space observatory that aims to study the cosmic microwave background, is planned to be launched.

== Predicted and scheduled events ==
- January 1 — Assuming no further extensions to the term of copyrights become law in the interim, books, films and other works by authors who died in 1961 will enter the public domain in the United Kingdom, the European Union and some other jurisdictions; those published in 1936 will enter the public domain in the United States.
- January 15–February 1 — The 2032 European Men's Handball Championship is expected to be held in France and Germany.
- April — The 2032 French presidential election is scheduled to be held, no less than 35 days after the five-year term starting in 2027 expires.
- June–July — Turkey and Italy are expected to co-host the UEFA Euro 2032.
- July 23–August 8 — The 2032 Summer Olympics is expected to be held in Brisbane, Queensland, Australia.
- August 24–September 5 — The 2032 Summer Paralympics is expected to be held in Brisbane.
- November 2 — The 2032 United States presidential election is scheduled to be held. The winners will be inaugurated on January 20, 2033.
- November 13 — A transit of Mercury will occur.
- December 1–December 19 — The 2032 European Women's Handball Championship is expected to be held in Germany, Denmark, and Poland.
- December 22 — The asteroid 2024 YR4, which had an impact rating of 3 on the Torino scale from January 27, 2025 to February 20, 2025, will pass by Earth.

=== Date unknown ===
- The Korea Lunar Lander and Rover, a lunar lander currently under development in South Korea, is scheduled to be launched.
- LiteBIRD, a planned small space observatory that aims to study the cosmic microwave background, is planned to be launched.

== Predicted and scheduled events ==
- January 1 — Assuming no further extensions to the term of copyrights become law in the interim, books, films and other works by authors who died in 1961 will enter the public domain in the United Kingdom, the European Union and some other jurisdictions; those published in 1936 will enter the public domain in the United States.
- January 15–February 1 — The 2032 European Men's Handball Championship is expected to be held in France and Germany.
- April — The 2032 French presidential election is scheduled to be held, no less than 35 days after the five-year term starting in 2027 expires.
- June–July — Turkey and Italy are expected to co-host the UEFA Euro 2032.
- July 23–August 8 — The 2032 Summer Olympics is expected to be held in Brisbane, Queensland, Australia.
- August 24–September 5 — The 2032 Summer Paralympics is expected to be held in Brisbane.
- November 2 — The 2032 United States presidential election is scheduled to be held. The winners will be inaugurated on January 20, 2033.
- November 13 — A transit of Mercury will occur.
- December 1–December 19 — The 2032 European Women's Handball Championship is expected to be held in Germany, Denmark, and Poland.
- December 22 — The asteroid 2024 YR4, which had an impact rating of 3 on the Torino scale from January 27, 2025 to February 20, 2025, will pass by Earth.

=== Date unknown ===
- The Korea Lunar Lander and Rover, a lunar lander currently under development in South Korea, is scheduled to be launched.
- LiteBIRD, a planned small space observatory that aims to study the cosmic microwave background, is planned to be launched.

== Predicted and scheduled events ==
- January 1 — Assuming no further extensions to the term of copyrights become law in the interim, books, films and other works by authors who died in 1961 will enter the public domain in the United Kingdom, the European Union and some other jurisdictions; those published in 1936 will enter the public domain in the United States.
- January 15–February 1 — The 2032 European Men's Handball Championship is expected to be held in France and Germany.
- April — The 2032 French presidential election is scheduled to be held, no less than 35 days after the five-year term starting in 2027 expires.
- June–July — Turkey and Italy are expected to co-host the UEFA Euro 2032.
- July 23–August 8 — The 2032 Summer Olympics is expected to be held in Brisbane, Queensland, Australia.
- August 24–September 5 — The 2032 Summer Paralympics is expected to be held in Brisbane.
- November 2 — The 2032 United States presidential election is scheduled to be held. The winners will be inaugurated on January 20, 2033.
- November 13 — A transit of Mercury will occur.
- December 1–December 19 — The 2032 European Women's Handball Championship is expected to be held in Germany, Denmark, and Poland.
- December 22 — The asteroid 2024 YR4, which had an impact rating of 3 on the Torino scale from January 27, 2025 to February 20, 2025, will pass by Earth.

=== Date unknown ===
- The Korea Lunar Lander and Rover, a lunar lander currently under development in South Korea, is scheduled to be launched.
- LiteBIRD, a planned small space observatory that aims to study the cosmic microwave background, is planned to be launched.

== Predicted and scheduled events ==
- January 1 — Assuming no further extensions to the term of copyrights become law in the interim, books, films and other works by authors who died in 1961 will enter the public domain in the United Kingdom, the European Union and some other jurisdictions; those published in 1936 will enter the public domain in the United States.
- January 15–February 1 — The 2032 European Men's Handball Championship is expected to be held in France and Germany.
- April — The 2032 French presidential election is scheduled to be held, no less than 35 days after the five-year term starting in 2027 expires.
- June–July — Turkey and Italy are expected to co-host the UEFA Euro 2032.
- July 23–August 8 — The 2032 Summer Olympics is expected to be held in Brisbane, Queensland, Australia.
- August 24–September 5 — The 2032 Summer Paralympics is expected to be held in Brisbane.
- November 2 — The 2032 United States presidential election is scheduled to be held. The winners will be inaugurated on January 20, 2033.
- November 13 — A transit of Mercury will occur.
- December 1–December 19 — The 2032 European Women's Handball Championship is expected to be held in Germany, Denmark, and Poland.
- December 22 — The asteroid 2024 YR4, which had an impact rating of 3 on the Torino scale from January 27, 2025 to February 20, 2025, will pass by Earth.

=== Date unknown ===
- The Korea Lunar Lander and Rover, a lunar lander currently under development in South Korea, is scheduled to be launched.
- LiteBIRD, a planned small space observatory that aims to study the cosmic microwave background, is planned to be launched.

== Predicted and scheduled events ==
- January 1 — Assuming no further extensions to the term of copyrights become law in the interim, books, films and other works by authors who died in 1961 will enter the public domain in the United Kingdom, the European Union and some other jurisdictions; those published in 1936 will enter the public domain in the United States.
- January 15–February 1 — The 2032 European Men's Handball Championship is expected to be held in France and Germany.
- April — The 2032 French presidential election is scheduled to be held, no less than 35 days after the five-year term starting in 2027 expires.
- June–July — Turkey and Italy are expected to co-host the UEFA Euro 2032.
- July 23–August 8 — The 2032 Summer Olympics is expected to be held in Brisbane, Queensland, Australia.
- August 24–September 5 — The 2032 Summer Paralympics is expected to be held in Brisbane.
- November 2 — The 2032 United States presidential election is scheduled to be held. The winners will be inaugurated on January 20, 2033.
- November 13 — A transit of Mercury will occur.
- December 1–December 19 — The 2032 European Women's Handball Championship is expected to be held in Germany, Denmark, and Poland.
- December 22 — The asteroid 2024 YR4, which had an impact rating of 3 on the Torino scale from January 27, 2025 to February 20, 2025, will pass by Earth.

=== Date unknown ===
- The Korea Lunar Lander and Rover, a lunar lander currently under development in South Korea, is scheduled to be launched.
- LiteBIRD, a planned small space observatory that aims to study the cosmic microwave background, is planned to be launched.

== Predicted and scheduled events ==
- January 1 — Assuming no further extensions to the term of copyrights become law in the interim, books, films and other works by authors who died in 1961 will enter the public domain in the United Kingdom, the European Union and some other jurisdictions; those published in 1936 will enter the public domain in the United States.
- January 15–February 1 — The 2032 European Men's Handball Championship is expected to be held in France and Germany.
- April — The 2032 French presidential election is scheduled to be held, no less than 35 days after the five-year term starting in 2027 expires.
- June–July — Turkey and Italy are expected to co-host the UEFA Euro 2032.
- July 23–August 8 — The 2032 Summer Olympics is expected to be held in Brisbane, Queensland, Australia.
- August 24–September 5 — The 2032 Summer Paralympics is expected to be held in Brisbane.
- November 2 — The 2032 United States presidential election is scheduled to be held. The winners will be inaugurated on January 20, 2033.
- November 13 — A transit of Mercury will occur.
- December 1–December 19 — The 2032 European Women's Handball Championship is expected to be held in Germany, Denmark, and Poland.
- December 22 — The asteroid 2024 YR4, which had an impact rating of 3 on the Torino scale from January 27, 2025 to February 20, 2025, will pass by Earth.

=== Date unknown ===
- The Korea Lunar Lander and Rover, a lunar lander currently under development in South Korea, is scheduled to be launched.
- LiteBIRD, a planned small space observatory that aims to study the cosmic microwave background, is planned to be launched.

== Predicted and scheduled events ==
- January 1 — Assuming no further extensions to the term of copyrights become law in the interim, books, films and other works by authors who died in 1961 will enter the public domain in the United Kingdom, the European Union and some other jurisdictions; those published in 1936 will enter the public domain in the United States.
- January 15–February 1 — The 2032 European Men's Handball Championship is expected to be held in France and Germany.
- April — The 2032 French presidential election is scheduled to be held, no less than 35 days after the five-year term starting in 2027 expires.
- June–July — Turkey and Italy are expected to co-host the UEFA Euro 2032.
- July 23–August 8 — The 2032 Summer Olympics is expected to be held in Brisbane, Queensland, Australia.
- August 24–September 5 — The 2032 Summer Paralympics is expected to be held in Brisbane.
- November 2 — The 2032 United States presidential election is scheduled to be held. The winners will be inaugurated on January 20, 2033.
- November 13 — A transit of Mercury will occur.
- December 1–December 19 — The 2032 European Women's Handball Championship is expected to be held in Germany, Denmark, and Poland.
- December 22 — The asteroid 2024 YR4, which had an impact rating of 3 on the Torino scale from January 27, 2025 to February 20, 2025, will pass by Earth.

=== Date unknown ===
- The Korea Lunar Lander and Rover, a lunar lander currently under development in South Korea, is scheduled to be launched.
- LiteBIRD, a planned small space observatory that aims to study the cosmic microwave background, is planned to be launched.

== Predicted and scheduled events ==
- January 1 — Assuming no further extensions to the term of copyrights become law in the interim, books, films and other works by authors who died in 1961 will enter the public domain in the United Kingdom, the European Union and some other jurisdictions; those published in 1936 will enter the public domain in the United States.
- January 15–February 1 — The 2032 European Men's Handball Championship is expected to be held in France and Germany.
- April — The 2032 French presidential election is scheduled to be held, no less than 35 days after the five-year term starting in 2027 expires.
- June–July — Turkey and Italy are expected to co-host the UEFA Euro 2032.
- July 23–August 8 — The 2032 Summer Olympics is expected to be held in Brisbane, Queensland, Australia.
- August 24–September 5 — The 2032 Summer Paralympics is expected to be held in Brisbane.
- November 2 — The 2032 United States presidential election is scheduled to be held. The winners will be inaugurated on January 20, 2033.
- November 13 — A transit of Mercury will occur.
- December 1–December 19 — The 2032 European Women's Handball Championship is expected to be held in Germany, Denmark, and Poland.
- December 22 — The asteroid 2024 YR4, which had an impact rating of 3 on the Torino scale from January 27, 2025 to February 20, 2025, will pass by Earth.

=== Date unknown ===
- The Korea Lunar Lander and Rover, a lunar lander currently under development in South Korea, is scheduled to be launched.
- LiteBIRD, a planned small space observatory that aims to study the cosmic microwave background, is planned to be launched.

== Predicted and scheduled events ==
- January 1 — Assuming no further extensions to the term of copyrights become law in the interim, books, films and other works by authors who died in 1961 will enter the public domain in the United Kingdom, the European Union and some other jurisdictions; those published in 1936 will enter the public domain in the United States.
- January 15–February 1 — The 2032 European Men's Handball Championship is expected to be held in France and Germany.
- April — The 2032 French presidential election is scheduled to be held, no less than 35 days after the five-year term starting in 2027 expires.
- June–July — Turkey and Italy are expected to co-host the UEFA Euro 2032.
- July 23–August 8 — The 2032 Summer Olympics is expected to be held in Brisbane, Queensland, Australia.
- August 24–September 5 — The 2032 Summer Paralympics is expected to be held in Brisbane.
- November 2 — The 2032 United States presidential election is scheduled to be held. The winners will be inaugurated on January 20, 2033.
- November 13 — A transit of Mercury will occur.
- December 1–December 19 — The 2032 European Women's Handball Championship is expected to be held in Germany, Denmark, and Poland.
- December 22 — The asteroid 2024 YR4, which had an impact rating of 3 on the Torino scale from January 27, 2025 to February 20, 2025, will pass by Earth.

=== Date unknown ===
- The Korea Lunar Lander and Rover, a lunar lander currently under development in South Korea, is scheduled to be launched.
- LiteBIRD, a planned small space observatory that aims to study the cosmic microwave background, is planned to be launched.

== Predicted and scheduled events ==
- January 1 — Assuming no further extensions to the term of copyrights become law in the interim, books, films and other works by authors who died in 1961 will enter the public domain in the United Kingdom, the European Union and some other jurisdictions; those published in 1936 will enter the public domain in the United States.
- January 15–February 1 — The 2032 European Men's Handball Championship is expected to be held in France and Germany.
- April — The 2032 French presidential election is scheduled to be held, no less than 35 days after the five-year term starting in 2027 expires.
- June–July — Turkey and Italy are expected to co-host the UEFA Euro 2032.
- July 23–August 8 — The 2032 Summer Olympics is expected to be held in Brisbane, Queensland, Australia.
- August 24–September 5 — The 2032 Summer Paralympics is expected to be held in Brisbane.
- November 2 — The 2032 United States presidential election is scheduled to be held. The winners will be inaugurated on January 20, 2033.
- November 13 — A transit of Mercury will occur.
- December 1–December 19 — The 2032 European Women's Handball Championship is expected to be held in Germany, Denmark, and Poland.
- December 22 — The asteroid 2024 YR4, which had an impact rating of 3 on the Torino scale from January 27, 2025 to February 20, 2025, will pass by Earth.

=== Date unknown ===
- The Korea Lunar Lander and Rover, a lunar lander currently under development in South Korea, is scheduled to be launched.
- LiteBIRD, a planned small space observatory that aims to study the cosmic microwave background, is planned to be launched.

== Predicted and scheduled events ==
- January 1 — Assuming no further extensions to the term of copyrights become law in the interim, books, films and other works by authors who died in 1961 will enter the public domain in the United Kingdom, the European Union and some other jurisdictions; those published in 1936 will enter the public domain in the United States.
- January 15–February 1 — The 2032 European Men's Handball Championship is expected to be held in France and Germany.
- April — The 2032 French presidential election is scheduled to be held, no less than 35 days after the five-year term starting in 2027 expires.
- June–July — Turkey and Italy are expected to co-host the UEFA Euro 2032.
- July 23–August 8 — The 2032 Summer Olympics is expected to be held in Brisbane, Queensland, Australia.
- August 24–September 5 — The 2032 Summer Paralympics is expected to be held in Brisbane.
- November 2 — The 2032 United States presidential election is scheduled to be held. The winners will be inaugurated on January 20, 2033.
- November 13 — A transit of Mercury will occur.
- December 1–December 19 — The 2032 European Women's Handball Championship is expected to be held in Germany, Denmark, and Poland.
- December 22 — The asteroid 2024 YR4, which had an impact rating of 3 on the Torino scale from January 27, 2025 to February 20, 2025, will pass by Earth.

=== Date unknown ===
- The Korea Lunar Lander and Rover, a lunar lander currently under development in South Korea, is scheduled to be launched.
- LiteBIRD, a planned small space observatory that aims to study the cosmic microwave background, is planned to be launched.

== Predicted and scheduled events ==
- January 1 — Assuming no further extensions to the term of copyrights become law in the interim, books, films and other works by authors who died in 1961 will enter the public domain in the United Kingdom, the European Union and some other jurisdictions; those published in 1936 will enter the public domain in the United States.
- January 15–February 1 — The 2032 European Men's Handball Championship is expected to be held in France and Germany.
- April — The 2032 French presidential election is scheduled to be held, no less than 35 days after the five-year term starting in 2027 expires.
- June–July — Turkey and Italy are expected to co-host the UEFA Euro 2032.
- July 23–August 8 — The 2032 Summer Olympics is expected to be held in Brisbane, Queensland, Australia.
- August 24–September 5 — The 2032 Summer Paralympics is expected to be held in Brisbane.
- November 2 — The 2032 United States presidential election is scheduled to be held. The winners will be inaugurated on January 20, 2033.
- November 13 — A transit of Mercury will occur.
- December 1–December 19 — The 2032 European Women's Handball Championship is expected to be held in Germany, Denmark, and Poland.
- December 22 — The asteroid 2024 YR4, which had an impact rating of 3 on the Torino scale from January 27, 2025 to February 20, 2025, will pass by Earth.

=== Date unknown ===
- The Korea Lunar Lander and Rover, a lunar lander currently under development in South Korea, is scheduled to be launched.
- LiteBIRD, a planned small space observatory that aims to study the cosmic microwave background, is planned to be launched.

== Predicted and scheduled events ==
- January 1 — Assuming no further extensions to the term of copyrights become law in the interim, books, films and other works by authors who died in 1961 will enter the public domain in the United Kingdom, the European Union and some other jurisdictions; those published in 1936 will enter the public domain in the United States.
- January 15–February 1 — The 2032 European Men's Handball Championship is expected to be held in France and Germany.
- April — The 2032 French presidential election is scheduled to be held, no less than 35 days after the five-year term starting in 2027 expires.
- June–July — Turkey and Italy are expected to co-host the UEFA Euro 2032.
- July 23–August 8 — The 2032 Summer Olympics is expected to be held in Brisbane, Queensland, Australia.
- August 24–September 5 — The 2032 Summer Paralympics is expected to be held in Brisbane.
- November 2 — The 2032 United States presidential election is scheduled to be held. The winners will be inaugurated on January 20, 2033.
- November 13 — A transit of Mercury will occur.
- December 1–December 19 — The 2032 European Women's Handball Championship is expected to be held in Germany, Denmark, and Poland.
- December 22 — The asteroid 2024 YR4, which had an impact rating of 3 on the Torino scale from January 27, 2025 to February 20, 2025, will pass by Earth.

=== Date unknown ===
- The Korea Lunar Lander and Rover, a lunar lander currently under development in South Korea, is scheduled to be launched.
- LiteBIRD, a planned small space observatory that aims to study the cosmic microwave background, is planned to be launched.

== Predicted and scheduled events ==
- January 1 — Assuming no further extensions to the term of copyrights become law in the interim, books, films and other works by authors who died in 1961 will enter the public domain in the United Kingdom, the European Union and some other jurisdictions; those published in 1936 will enter the public domain in the United States.
- January 15–February 1 — The 2032 European Men's Handball Championship is expected to be held in France and Germany.
- April — The 2032 French presidential election is scheduled to be held, no less than 35 days after the five-year term starting in 2027 expires.
- June–July — Turkey and Italy are expected to co-host the UEFA Euro 2032.
- July 23–August 8 — The 2032 Summer Olympics is expected to be held in Brisbane, Queensland, Australia.
- August 24–September 5 — The 2032 Summer Paralympics is expected to be held in Brisbane.
- November 2 — The 2032 United States presidential election is scheduled to be held. The winners will be inaugurated on January 20, 2033.
- November 13 — A transit of Mercury will occur.
- December 1–December 19 — The 2032 European Women's Handball Championship is expected to be held in Germany, Denmark, and Poland.
- December 22 — The asteroid 2024 YR4, which had an impact rating of 3 on the Torino scale from January 27, 2025 to February 20, 2025, will pass by Earth.

=== Date unknown ===
- The Korea Lunar Lander and Rover, a lunar lander currently under development in South Korea, is scheduled to be launched.
- LiteBIRD, a planned small space observatory that aims to study the cosmic microwave background, is planned to be launched.

== Predicted and scheduled events ==
- January 1 — Assuming no further extensions to the term of copyrights become law in the interim, books, films and other works by authors who died in 1961 will enter the public domain in the United Kingdom, the European Union and some other jurisdictions; those published in 1936 will enter the public domain in the United States.
- January 15–February 1 — The 2032 European Men's Handball Championship is expected to be held in France and Germany.
- April — The 2032 French presidential election is scheduled to be held, no less than 35 days after the five-year term starting in 2027 expires.
- June–July — Turkey and Italy are expected to co-host the UEFA Euro 2032.
- July 23–August 8 — The 2032 Summer Olympics is expected to be held in Brisbane, Queensland, Australia.
- August 24–September 5 — The 2032 Summer Paralympics is expected to be held in Brisbane.
- November 2 — The 2032 United States presidential election is scheduled to be held. The winners will be inaugurated on January 20, 2033.
- November 13 — A transit of Mercury will occur.
- December 1–December 19 — The 2032 European Women's Handball Championship is expected to be held in Germany, Denmark, and Poland.
- December 22 — The asteroid 2024 YR4, which had an impact rating of 3 on the Torino scale from January 27, 2025 to February 20, 2025, will pass by Earth.

=== Date unknown ===
- The Korea Lunar Lander and Rover, a lunar lander currently under development in South Korea, is scheduled to be launched.
- LiteBIRD, a planned small space observatory that aims to study the cosmic microwave background, is planned to be launched.

== Predicted and scheduled events ==
- January 1 — Assuming no further extensions to the term of copyrights become law in the interim, books, films and other works by authors who died in 1961 will enter the public domain in the United Kingdom, the European Union and some other jurisdictions; those published in 1936 will enter the public domain in the United States.
- January 15–February 1 — The 2032 European Men's Handball Championship is expected to be held in France and Germany.
- April — The 2032 French presidential election is scheduled to be held, no less than 35 days after the five-year term starting in 2027 expires.
- June–July — Turkey and Italy are expected to co-host the UEFA Euro 2032.
- July 23–August 8 — The 2032 Summer Olympics is expected to be held in Brisbane, Queensland, Australia.
- August 24–September 5 — The 2032 Summer Paralympics is expected to be held in Brisbane.
- November 2 — The 2032 United States presidential election is scheduled to be held. The winners will be inaugurated on January 20, 2033.
- November 13 — A transit of Mercury will occur.
- December 1–December 19 — The 2032 European Women's Handball Championship is expected to be held in Germany, Denmark, and Poland.
- December 22 — The asteroid 2024 YR4, which had an impact rating of 3 on the Torino scale from January 27, 2025 to February 20, 2025, will pass by Earth.

=== Date unknown ===
- The Korea Lunar Lander and Rover, a lunar lander currently under development in South Korea, is scheduled to be launched.
- LiteBIRD, a planned small space observatory that aims to study the cosmic microwave background, is planned to be launched.

== Predicted and scheduled events ==
- January 1 — Assuming no further extensions to the term of copyrights become law in the interim, books, films and other works by authors who died in 1961 will enter the public domain in the United Kingdom, the European Union and some other jurisdictions; those published in 1936 will enter the public domain in the United States.
- January 15–February 1 — The 2032 European Men's Handball Championship is expected to be held in France and Germany.
- April — The 2032 French presidential election is scheduled to be held, no less than 35 days after the five-year term starting in 2027 expires.
- June–July — Turkey and Italy are expected to co-host the UEFA Euro 2032.
- July 23–August 8 — The 2032 Summer Olympics is expected to be held in Brisbane, Queensland, Australia.
- August 24–September 5 — The 2032 Summer Paralympics is expected to be held in Brisbane.
- November 2 — The 2032 United States presidential election is scheduled to be held. The winners will be inaugurated on January 20, 2033.
- November 13 — A transit of Mercury will occur.
- December 1–December 19 — The 2032 European Women's Handball Championship is expected to be held in Germany, Denmark, and Poland.
- December 22 — The asteroid 2024 YR4, which had an impact rating of 3 on the Torino scale from January 27, 2025 to February 20, 2025, will pass by Earth.

=== Date unknown ===
- The Korea Lunar Lander and Rover, a lunar lander currently under development in South Korea, is scheduled to be launched.
- LiteBIRD, a planned small space observatory that aims to study the cosmic microwave background, is planned to be launched.

== Predicted and scheduled events ==
- January 1 — Assuming no further extensions to the term of copyrights become law in the interim, books, films and other works by authors who died in 1961 will enter the public domain in the United Kingdom, the European Union and some other jurisdictions; those published in 1936 will enter the public domain in the United States.
- January 15–February 1 — The 2032 European Men's Handball Championship is expected to be held in France and Germany.
- April — The 2032 French presidential election is scheduled to be held, no less than 35 days after the five-year term starting in 2027 expires.
- June–July — Turkey and Italy are expected to co-host the UEFA Euro 2032.
- July 23–August 8 — The 2032 Summer Olympics is expected to be held in Brisbane, Queensland, Australia.
- August 24–September 5 — The 2032 Summer Paralympics is expected to be held in Brisbane.
- November 2 — The 2032 United States presidential election is scheduled to be held. The winners will be inaugurated on January 20, 2033.
- November 13 — A transit of Mercury will occur.
- December 1–December 19 — The 2032 European Women's Handball Championship is expected to be held in Germany, Denmark, and Poland.
- December 22 — The asteroid 2024 YR4, which had an impact rating of 3 on the Torino scale from January 27, 2025 to February 20, 2025, will pass by Earth.

=== Date unknown ===
- The Korea Lunar Lander and Rover, a lunar lander currently under development in South Korea, is scheduled to be launched.
- LiteBIRD, a planned small space observatory that aims to study the cosmic microwave background, is planned to be launched.

== Predicted and scheduled events ==
- January 1 — Assuming no further extensions to the term of copyrights become law in the interim, books, films and other works by authors who died in 1961 will enter the public domain in the United Kingdom, the European Union and some other jurisdictions; those published in 1936 will enter the public domain in the United States.
- January 15–February 1 — The 2032 European Men's Handball Championship is expected to be held in France and Germany.
- April — The 2032 French presidential election is scheduled to be held, no less than 35 days after the five-year term starting in 2027 expires.
- June–July — Turkey and Italy are expected to co-host the UEFA Euro 2032.
- July 23–August 8 — The 2032 Summer Olympics is expected to be held in Brisbane, Queensland, Australia.
- August 24–September 5 — The 2032 Summer Paralympics is expected to be held in Brisbane.
- November 2 — The 2032 United States presidential election is scheduled to be held. The winners will be inaugurated on January 20, 2033.
- November 13 — A transit of Mercury will occur.
- December 1–December 19 — The 2032 European Women's Handball Championship is expected to be held in Germany, Denmark, and Poland.
- December 22 — The asteroid 2024 YR4, which had an impact rating of 3 on the Torino scale from January 27, 2025 to February 20, 2025, will pass by Earth.

=== Date unknown ===
- The Korea Lunar Lander and Rover, a lunar lander currently under development in South Korea, is scheduled to be launched.
- LiteBIRD, a planned small space observatory that aims to study the cosmic microwave background, is planned to be launched.

== Predicted and scheduled events ==
- January 1 — Assuming no further extensions to the term of copyrights become law in the interim, books, films and other works by authors who died in 1961 will enter the public domain in the United Kingdom, the European Union and some other jurisdictions; those published in 1936 will enter the public domain in the United States.
- January 15–February 1 — The 2032 European Men's Handball Championship is expected to be held in France and Germany.
- April — The 2032 French presidential election is scheduled to be held, no less than 35 days after the five-year term starting in 2027 expires.
- June–July — Turkey and Italy are expected to co-host the UEFA Euro 2032.
- July 23–August 8 — The 2032 Summer Olympics is expected to be held in Brisbane, Queensland, Australia.
- August 24–September 5 — The 2032 Summer Paralympics is expected to be held in Brisbane.
- November 2 — The 2032 United States presidential election is scheduled to be held. The winners will be inaugurated on January 20, 2033.
- November 13 — A transit of Mercury will occur.
- December 1–December 19 — The 2032 European Women's Handball Championship is expected to be held in Germany, Denmark, and Poland.
- December 22 — The asteroid 2024 YR4, which had an impact rating of 3 on the Torino scale from January 27, 2025 to February 20, 2025, will pass by Earth.

=== Date unknown ===
- The Korea Lunar Lander and Rover, a lunar lander currently under development in South Korea, is scheduled to be launched.
- LiteBIRD, a planned small space observatory that aims to study the cosmic microwave background, is planned to be launched.

== Predicted and scheduled events ==
- January 1 — Assuming no further extensions to the term of copyrights become law in the interim, books, films and other works by authors who died in 1961 will enter the public domain in the United Kingdom, the European Union and some other jurisdictions; those published in 1936 will enter the public domain in the United States.
- January 15–February 1 — The 2032 European Men's Handball Championship is expected to be held in France and Germany.
- April — The 2032 French presidential election is scheduled to be held, no less than 35 days after the five-year term starting in 2027 expires.
- June–July — Turkey and Italy are expected to co-host the UEFA Euro 2032.
- July 23–August 8 — The 2032 Summer Olympics is expected to be held in Brisbane, Queensland, Australia.
- August 24–September 5 — The 2032 Summer Paralympics is expected to be held in Brisbane.
- November 2 — The 2032 United States presidential election is scheduled to be held. The winners will be inaugurated on January 20, 2033.
- November 13 — A transit of Mercury will occur.
- December 1–December 19 — The 2032 European Women's Handball Championship is expected to be held in Germany, Denmark, and Poland.
- December 22 — The asteroid 2024 YR4, which had an impact rating of 3 on the Torino scale from January 27, 2025 to February 20, 2025, will pass by Earth.

=== Date unknown ===
- The Korea Lunar Lander and Rover, a lunar lander currently under development in South Korea, is scheduled to be launched.
- LiteBIRD, a planned small space observatory that aims to study the cosmic microwave background, is planned to be launched.

== Predicted and scheduled events ==
- January 1 — Assuming no further extensions to the term of copyrights become law in the interim, books, films and other works by authors who died in 1961 will enter the public domain in the United Kingdom, the European Union and some other jurisdictions; those published in 1936 will enter the public domain in the United States.
- January 15–February 1 — The 2032 European Men's Handball Championship is expected to be held in France and Germany.
- April — The 2032 French presidential election is scheduled to be held, no less than 35 days after the five-year term starting in 2027 expires.
- June–July — Turkey and Italy are expected to co-host the UEFA Euro 2032.
- July 23–August 8 — The 2032 Summer Olympics is expected to be held in Brisbane, Queensland, Australia.
- August 24–September 5 — The 2032 Summer Paralympics is expected to be held in Brisbane.
- November 2 — The 2032 United States presidential election is scheduled to be held. The winners will be inaugurated on January 20, 2033.
- November 13 — A transit of Mercury will occur.
- December 1–December 19 — The 2032 European Women's Handball Championship is expected to be held in Germany, Denmark, and Poland.
- December 22 — The asteroid 2024 YR4, which had an impact rating of 3 on the Torino scale from January 27, 2025 to February 20, 2025, will pass by Earth.

=== Date unknown ===
- The Korea Lunar Lander and Rover, a lunar lander currently under development in South Korea, is scheduled to be launched.
- LiteBIRD, a planned small space observatory that aims to study the cosmic microwave background, is planned to be launched.

== Predicted and scheduled events ==
- January 1 — Assuming no further extensions to the term of copyrights become law in the interim, books, films and other works by authors who died in 1961 will enter the public domain in the United Kingdom, the European Union and some other jurisdictions; those published in 1936 will enter the public domain in the United States.
- January 15–February 1 — The 2032 European Men's Handball Championship is expected to be held in France and Germany.
- April — The 2032 French presidential election is scheduled to be held, no less than 35 days after the five-year term starting in 2027 expires.
- June–July — Turkey and Italy are expected to co-host the UEFA Euro 2032.
- July 23–August 8 — The 2032 Summer Olympics is expected to be held in Brisbane, Queensland, Australia.
- August 24–September 5 — The 2032 Summer Paralympics is expected to be held in Brisbane.
- November 2 — The 2032 United States presidential election is scheduled to be held. The winners will be inaugurated on January 20, 2033.
- November 13 — A transit of Mercury will occur.
- December 1–December 19 — The 2032 European Women's Handball Championship is expected to be held in Germany, Denmark, and Poland.
- December 22 — The asteroid 2024 YR4, which had an impact rating of 3 on the Torino scale from January 27, 2025 to February 20, 2025, will pass by Earth.

=== Date unknown ===
- The Korea Lunar Lander and Rover, a lunar lander currently under development in South Korea, is scheduled to be launched.
- LiteBIRD, a planned small space observatory that aims to study the cosmic microwave background, is planned to be launched.

== Predicted and scheduled events ==
- January 1 — Assuming no further extensions to the term of copyrights become law in the interim, books, films and other works by authors who died in 1961 will enter the public domain in the United Kingdom, the European Union and some other jurisdictions; those published in 1936 will enter the public domain in the United States.
- January 15–February 1 — The 2032 European Men's Handball Championship is expected to be held in France and Germany.
- April — The 2032 French presidential election is scheduled to be held, no less than 35 days after the five-year term starting in 2027 expires.
- June–July — Turkey and Italy are expected to co-host the UEFA Euro 2032.
- July 23–August 8 — The 2032 Summer Olympics is expected to be held in Brisbane, Queensland, Australia.
- August 24–September 5 — The 2032 Summer Paralympics is expected to be held in Brisbane.
- November 2 — The 2032 United States presidential election is scheduled to be held. The winners will be inaugurated on January 20, 2033.
- November 13 — A transit of Mercury will occur.
- December 1–December 19 — The 2032 European Women's Handball Championship is expected to be held in Germany, Denmark, and Poland.
- December 22 — The asteroid 2024 YR4, which had an impact rating of 3 on the Torino scale from January 27, 2025 to February 20, 2025, will pass by Earth.

=== Date unknown ===
- The Korea Lunar Lander and Rover, a lunar lander currently under development in South Korea, is scheduled to be launched.
- LiteBIRD, a planned small space observatory that aims to study the cosmic microwave background, is planned to be launched.

== Predicted and scheduled events ==
- January 1 — Assuming no further extensions to the term of copyrights become law in the interim, books, films and other works by authors who died in 1961 will enter the public domain in the United Kingdom, the European Union and some other jurisdictions; those published in 1936 will enter the public domain in the United States.
- January 15–February 1 — The 2032 European Men's Handball Championship is expected to be held in France and Germany.
- April — The 2032 French presidential election is scheduled to be held, no less than 35 days after the five-year term starting in 2027 expires.
- June–July — Turkey and Italy are expected to co-host the UEFA Euro 2032.
- July 23–August 8 — The 2032 Summer Olympics is expected to be held in Brisbane, Queensland, Australia.
- August 24–September 5 — The 2032 Summer Paralympics is expected to be held in Brisbane.
- November 2 — The 2032 United States presidential election is scheduled to be held. The winners will be inaugurated on January 20, 2033.
- November 13 — A transit of Mercury will occur.
- December 1–December 19 — The 2032 European Women's Handball Championship is expected to be held in Germany, Denmark, and Poland.
- December 22 — The asteroid 2024 YR4, which had an impact rating of 3 on the Torino scale from January 27, 2025 to February 20, 2025, will pass by Earth.

=== Date unknown ===
- The Korea Lunar Lander and Rover, a lunar lander currently under development in South Korea, is scheduled to be launched.
- LiteBIRD, a planned small space observatory that aims to study the cosmic microwave background, is planned to be launched.

== Predicted and scheduled events ==
- January 1 — Assuming no further extensions to the term of copyrights become law in the interim, books, films and other works by authors who died in 1961 will enter the public domain in the United Kingdom, the European Union and some other jurisdictions; those published in 1936 will enter the public domain in the United States.
- January 15–February 1 — The 2032 European Men's Handball Championship is expected to be held in France and Germany.
- April — The 2032 French presidential election is scheduled to be held, no less than 35 days after the five-year term starting in 2027 expires.
- June–July — Turkey and Italy are expected to co-host the UEFA Euro 2032.
- July 23–August 8 — The 2032 Summer Olympics is expected to be held in Brisbane, Queensland, Australia.
- August 24–September 5 — The 2032 Summer Paralympics is expected to be held in Brisbane.
- November 2 — The 2032 United States presidential election is scheduled to be held. The winners will be inaugurated on January 20, 2033.
- November 13 — A transit of Mercury will occur.
- December 1–December 19 — The 2032 European Women's Handball Championship is expected to be held in Germany, Denmark, and Poland.
- December 22 — The asteroid 2024 YR4, which had an impact rating of 3 on the Torino scale from January 27, 2025 to February 20, 2025, will pass by Earth.

=== Date unknown ===
- The Korea Lunar Lander and Rover, a lunar lander currently under development in South Korea, is scheduled to be launched.
- LiteBIRD, a planned small space observatory that aims to study the cosmic microwave background, is planned to be launched.

== Predicted and scheduled events ==
- January 1 — Assuming no further extensions to the term of copyrights become law in the interim, books, films and other works by authors who died in 1961 will enter the public domain in the United Kingdom, the European Union and some other jurisdictions; those published in 1936 will enter the public domain in the United States.
- January 15–February 1 — The 2032 European Men's Handball Championship is expected to be held in France and Germany.
- April — The 2032 French presidential election is scheduled to be held, no less than 35 days after the five-year term starting in 2027 expires.
- June–July — Turkey and Italy are expected to co-host the UEFA Euro 2032.
- July 23–August 8 — The 2032 Summer Olympics is expected to be held in Brisbane, Queensland, Australia.
- August 24–September 5 — The 2032 Summer Paralympics is expected to be held in Brisbane.
- November 2 — The 2032 United States presidential election is scheduled to be held. The winners will be inaugurated on January 20, 2033.
- November 13 — A transit of Mercury will occur.
- December 1–December 19 — The 2032 European Women's Handball Championship is expected to be held in Germany, Denmark, and Poland.
- December 22 — The asteroid 2024 YR4, which had an impact rating of 3 on the Torino scale from January 27, 2025 to February 20, 2025, will pass by Earth.

=== Date unknown ===
- The Korea Lunar Lander and Rover, a lunar lander currently under development in South Korea, is scheduled to be launched.
- LiteBIRD, a planned small space observatory that aims to study the cosmic microwave background, is planned to be launched.

== Predicted and scheduled events ==
- January 1 — Assuming no further extensions to the term of copyrights become law in the interim, books, films and other works by authors who died in 1961 will enter the public domain in the United Kingdom, the European Union and some other jurisdictions; those published in 1936 will enter the public domain in the United States.
- January 15–February 1 — The 2032 European Men's Handball Championship is expected to be held in France and Germany.
- April — The 2032 French presidential election is scheduled to be held, no less than 35 days after the five-year term starting in 2027 expires.
- June–July — Turkey and Italy are expected to co-host the UEFA Euro 2032.
- July 23–August 8 — The 2032 Summer Olympics is expected to be held in Brisbane, Queensland, Australia.
- August 24–September 5 — The 2032 Summer Paralympics is expected to be held in Brisbane.
- November 2 — The 2032 United States presidential election is scheduled to be held. The winners will be inaugurated on January 20, 2033.
- November 13 — A transit of Mercury will occur.
- December 1–December 19 — The 2032 European Women's Handball Championship is expected to be held in Germany, Denmark, and Poland.
- December 22 — The asteroid 2024 YR4, which had an impact rating of 3 on the Torino scale from January 27, 2025 to February 20, 2025, will pass by Earth.

=== Date unknown ===
- The Korea Lunar Lander and Rover, a lunar lander currently under development in South Korea, is scheduled to be launched.
- LiteBIRD, a planned small space observatory that aims to study the cosmic microwave background, is planned to be launched.

== Predicted and scheduled events ==
- January 1 — Assuming no further extensions to the term of copyrights become law in the interim, books, films and other works by authors who died in 1961 will enter the public domain in the United Kingdom, the European Union and some other jurisdictions; those published in 1936 will enter the public domain in the United States.
- January 15–February 1 — The 2032 European Men's Handball Championship is expected to be held in France and Germany.
- April — The 2032 French presidential election is scheduled to be held, no less than 35 days after the five-year term starting in 2027 expires.
- June–July — Turkey and Italy are expected to co-host the UEFA Euro 2032.
- July 23–August 8 — The 2032 Summer Olympics is expected to be held in Brisbane, Queensland, Australia.
- August 24–September 5 — The 2032 Summer Paralympics is expected to be held in Brisbane.
- November 2 — The 2032 United States presidential election is scheduled to be held. The winners will be inaugurated on January 20, 2033.
- November 13 — A transit of Mercury will occur.
- December 1–December 19 — The 2032 European Women's Handball Championship is expected to be held in Germany, Denmark, and Poland.
- December 22 — The asteroid 2024 YR4, which had an impact rating of 3 on the Torino scale from January 27, 2025 to February 20, 2025, will pass by Earth.

=== Date unknown ===
- The Korea Lunar Lander and Rover, a lunar lander currently under development in South Korea, is scheduled to be launched.
- LiteBIRD, a planned small space observatory that aims to study the cosmic microwave background, is planned to be launched.

== Predicted and scheduled events ==
- January 1 — Assuming no further extensions to the term of copyrights become law in the interim, books, films and other works by authors who died in 1961 will enter the public domain in the United Kingdom, the European Union and some other jurisdictions; those published in 1936 will enter the public domain in the United States.
- January 15–February 1 — The 2032 European Men's Handball Championship is expected to be held in France and Germany.
- April — The 2032 French presidential election is scheduled to be held, no less than 35 days after the five-year term starting in 2027 expires.
- June–July — Turkey and Italy are expected to co-host the UEFA Euro 2032.
- July 23–August 8 — The 2032 Summer Olympics is expected to be held in Brisbane, Queensland, Australia.
- August 24–September 5 — The 2032 Summer Paralympics is expected to be held in Brisbane.
- November 2 — The 2032 United States presidential election is scheduled to be held. The winners will be inaugurated on January 20, 2033.
- November 13 — A transit of Mercury will occur.
- December 1–December 19 — The 2032 European Women's Handball Championship is expected to be held in Germany, Denmark, and Poland.
- December 22 — The asteroid 2024 YR4, which had an impact rating of 3 on the Torino scale from January 27, 2025 to February 20, 2025, will pass by Earth.

=== Date unknown ===
- The Korea Lunar Lander and Rover, a lunar lander currently under development in South Korea, is scheduled to be launched.
- LiteBIRD, a planned small space observatory that aims to study the cosmic microwave background, is planned to be launched.

== Predicted and scheduled events ==
- January 1 — Assuming no further extensions to the term of copyrights become law in the interim, books, films and other works by authors who died in 1961 will enter the public domain in the United Kingdom, the European Union and some other jurisdictions; those published in 1936 will enter the public domain in the United States.
- January 15–February 1 — The 2032 European Men's Handball Championship is expected to be held in France and Germany.
- April — The 2032 French presidential election is scheduled to be held, no less than 35 days after the five-year term starting in 2027 expires.
- June–July — Turkey and Italy are expected to co-host the UEFA Euro 2032.
- July 23–August 8 — The 2032 Summer Olympics is expected to be held in Brisbane, Queensland, Australia.
- August 24–September 5 — The 2032 Summer Paralympics is expected to be held in Brisbane.
- November 2 — The 2032 United States presidential election is scheduled to be held. The winners will be inaugurated on January 20, 2033.
- November 13 — A transit of Mercury will occur.
- December 1–December 19 — The 2032 European Women's Handball Championship is expected to be held in Germany, Denmark, and Poland.
- December 22 — The asteroid 2024 YR4, which had an impact rating of 3 on the Torino scale from January 27, 2025 to February 20, 2025, will pass by Earth.

=== Date unknown ===
- The Korea Lunar Lander and Rover, a lunar lander currently under development in South Korea, is scheduled to be launched.
- LiteBIRD, a planned small space observatory that aims to study the cosmic microwave background, is planned to be launched.

== Predicted and scheduled events ==
- January 1 — Assuming no further extensions to the term of copyrights become law in the interim, books, films and other works by authors who died in 1961 will enter the public domain in the United Kingdom, the European Union and some other jurisdictions; those published in 1936 will enter the public domain in the United States.
- January 15–February 1 — The 2032 European Men's Handball Championship is expected to be held in France and Germany.
- April — The 2032 French presidential election is scheduled to be held, no less than 35 days after the five-year term starting in 2027 expires.
- June–July — Turkey and Italy are expected to co-host the UEFA Euro 2032.
- July 23–August 8 — The 2032 Summer Olympics is expected to be held in Brisbane, Queensland, Australia.
- August 24–September 5 — The 2032 Summer Paralympics is expected to be held in Brisbane.
- November 2 — The 2032 United States presidential election is scheduled to be held. The winners will be inaugurated on January 20, 2033.
- November 13 — A transit of Mercury will occur.
- December 1–December 19 — The 2032 European Women's Handball Championship is expected to be held in Germany, Denmark, and Poland.
- December 22 — The asteroid 2024 YR4, which had an impact rating of 3 on the Torino scale from January 27, 2025 to February 20, 2025, will pass by Earth.

=== Date unknown ===
- The Korea Lunar Lander and Rover, a lunar lander currently under development in South Korea, is scheduled to be launched.
- LiteBIRD, a planned small space observatory that aims to study the cosmic microwave background, is planned to be launched.

== Predicted and scheduled events ==
- January 1 — Assuming no further extensions to the term of copyrights become law in the interim, books, films and other works by authors who died in 1961 will enter the public domain in the United Kingdom, the European Union and some other jurisdictions; those published in 1936 will enter the public domain in the United States.
- January 15–February 1 — The 2032 European Men's Handball Championship is expected to be held in France and Germany.
- April — The 2032 French presidential election is scheduled to be held, no less than 35 days after the five-year term starting in 2027 expires.
- June–July — Turkey and Italy are expected to co-host the UEFA Euro 2032.
- July 23–August 8 — The 2032 Summer Olympics is expected to be held in Brisbane, Queensland, Australia.
- August 24–September 5 — The 2032 Summer Paralympics is expected to be held in Brisbane.
- November 2 — The 2032 United States presidential election is scheduled to be held. The winners will be inaugurated on January 20, 2033.
- November 13 — A transit of Mercury will occur.
- December 1–December 19 — The 2032 European Women's Handball Championship is expected to be held in Germany, Denmark, and Poland.
- December 22 — The asteroid 2024 YR4, which had an impact rating of 3 on the Torino scale from January 27, 2025 to February 20, 2025, will pass by Earth.

=== Date unknown ===
- The Korea Lunar Lander and Rover, a lunar lander currently under development in South Korea, is scheduled to be launched.
- LiteBIRD, a planned small space observatory that aims to study the cosmic microwave background, is planned to be launched.

== Predicted and scheduled events ==
- January 1 — Assuming no further extensions to the term of copyrights become law in the interim, books, films and other works by authors who died in 1961 will enter the public domain in the United Kingdom, the European Union and some other jurisdictions; those published in 1936 will enter the public domain in the United States.
- January 15–February 1 — The 2032 European Men's Handball Championship is expected to be held in France and Germany.
- April — The 2032 French presidential election is scheduled to be held, no less than 35 days after the five-year term starting in 2027 expires.
- June–July — Turkey and Italy are expected to co-host the UEFA Euro 2032.
- July 23–August 8 — The 2032 Summer Olympics is expected to be held in Brisbane, Queensland, Australia.
- August 24–September 5 — The 2032 Summer Paralympics is expected to be held in Brisbane.
- November 2 — The 2032 United States presidential election is scheduled to be held. The winners will be inaugurated on January 20, 2033.
- November 13 — A transit of Mercury will occur.
- December 1–December 19 — The 2032 European Women's Handball Championship is expected to be held in Germany, Denmark, and Poland.
- December 22 — The asteroid 2024 YR4, which had an impact rating of 3 on the Torino scale from January 27, 2025 to February 20, 2025, will pass by Earth.

=== Date unknown ===
- The Korea Lunar Lander and Rover, a lunar lander currently under development in South Korea, is scheduled to be launched.
- LiteBIRD, a planned small space observatory that aims to study the cosmic microwave background, is planned to be launched.

== Predicted and scheduled events ==
- January 1 — Assuming no further extensions to the term of copyrights become law in the interim, books, films and other works by authors who died in 1961 will enter the public domain in the United Kingdom, the European Union and some other jurisdictions; those published in 1936 will enter the public domain in the United States.
- January 15–February 1 — The 2032 European Men's Handball Championship is expected to be held in France and Germany.
- April — The 2032 French presidential election is scheduled to be held, no less than 35 days after the five-year term starting in 2027 expires.
- June–July — Turkey and Italy are expected to co-host the UEFA Euro 2032.
- July 23–August 8 — The 2032 Summer Olympics is expected to be held in Brisbane, Queensland, Australia.
- August 24–September 5 — The 2032 Summer Paralympics is expected to be held in Brisbane.
- November 2 — The 2032 United States presidential election is scheduled to be held. The winners will be inaugurated on January 20, 2033.
- November 13 — A transit of Mercury will occur.
- December 1–December 19 — The 2032 European Women's Handball Championship is expected to be held in Germany, Denmark, and Poland.
- December 22 — The asteroid 2024 YR4, which had an impact rating of 3 on the Torino scale from January 27, 2025 to February 20, 2025, will pass by Earth.

=== Date unknown ===
- The Korea Lunar Lander and Rover, a lunar lander currently under development in South Korea, is scheduled to be launched.
- LiteBIRD, a planned small space observatory that aims to study the cosmic microwave background, is planned to be launched.

== Predicted and scheduled events ==
- January 1 — Assuming no further extensions to the term of copyrights become law in the interim, books, films and other works by authors who died in 1961 will enter the public domain in the United Kingdom, the European Union and some other jurisdictions; those published in 1936 will enter the public domain in the United States.
- January 15–February 1 — The 2032 European Men's Handball Championship is expected to be held in France and Germany.
- April — The 2032 French presidential election is scheduled to be held, no less than 35 days after the five-year term starting in 2027 expires.
- June–July — Turkey and Italy are expected to co-host the UEFA Euro 2032.
- July 23–August 8 — The 2032 Summer Olympics is expected to be held in Brisbane, Queensland, Australia.
- August 24–September 5 — The 2032 Summer Paralympics is expected to be held in Brisbane.
- November 2 — The 2032 United States presidential election is scheduled to be held. The winners will be inaugurated on January 20, 2033.
- November 13 — A transit of Mercury will occur.
- December 1–December 19 — The 2032 European Women's Handball Championship is expected to be held in Germany, Denmark, and Poland.
- December 22 — The asteroid 2024 YR4, which had an impact rating of 3 on the Torino scale from January 27, 2025 to February 20, 2025, will pass by Earth.

=== Date unknown ===
- The Korea Lunar Lander and Rover, a lunar lander currently under development in South Korea, is scheduled to be launched.
- LiteBIRD, a planned small space observatory that aims to study the cosmic microwave background, is planned to be launched.

== Predicted and scheduled events ==
- January 1 — Assuming no further extensions to the term of copyrights become law in the interim, books, films and other works by authors who died in 1961 will enter the public domain in the United Kingdom, the European Union and some other jurisdictions; those published in 1936 will enter the public domain in the United States.
- January 15–February 1 — The 2032 European Men's Handball Championship is expected to be held in France and Germany.
- April — The 2032 French presidential election is scheduled to be held, no less than 35 days after the five-year term starting in 2027 expires.
- June–July — Turkey and Italy are expected to co-host the UEFA Euro 2032.
- July 23–August 8 — The 2032 Summer Olympics is expected to be held in Brisbane, Queensland, Australia.
- August 24–September 5 — The 2032 Summer Paralympics is expected to be held in Brisbane.
- November 2 — The 2032 United States presidential election is scheduled to be held. The winners will be inaugurated on January 20, 2033.
- November 13 — A transit of Mercury will occur.
- December 1–December 19 — The 2032 European Women's Handball Championship is expected to be held in Germany, Denmark, and Poland.
- December 22 — The asteroid 2024 YR4, which had an impact rating of 3 on the Torino scale from January 27, 2025 to February 20, 2025, will pass by Earth.

=== Date unknown ===
- The Korea Lunar Lander and Rover, a lunar lander currently under development in South Korea, is scheduled to be launched.
- LiteBIRD, a planned small space observatory that aims to study the cosmic microwave background, is planned to be launched.

== Predicted and scheduled events ==
- January 1 — Assuming no further extensions to the term of copyrights become law in the interim, books, films and other works by authors who died in 1961 will enter the public domain in the United Kingdom, the European Union and some other jurisdictions; those published in 1936 will enter the public domain in the United States.
- January 15–February 1 — The 2032 European Men's Handball Championship is expected to be held in France and Germany.
- April — The 2032 French presidential election is scheduled to be held, no less than 35 days after the five-year term starting in 2027 expires.
- June–July — Turkey and Italy are expected to co-host the UEFA Euro 2032.
- July 23–August 8 — The 2032 Summer Olympics is expected to be held in Brisbane, Queensland, Australia.
- August 24–September 5 — The 2032 Summer Paralympics is expected to be held in Brisbane.
- November 2 — The 2032 United States presidential election is scheduled to be held. The winners will be inaugurated on January 20, 2033.
- November 13 — A transit of Mercury will occur.
- December 1–December 19 — The 2032 European Women's Handball Championship is expected to be held in Germany, Denmark, and Poland.
- December 22 — The asteroid 2024 YR4, which had an impact rating of 3 on the Torino scale from January 27, 2025 to February 20, 2025, will pass by Earth.

=== Date unknown ===
- The Korea Lunar Lander and Rover, a lunar lander currently under development in South Korea, is scheduled to be launched.
- LiteBIRD, a planned small space observatory that aims to study the cosmic microwave background, is planned to be launched.

== Predicted and scheduled events ==
- January 1 — Assuming no further extensions to the term of copyrights become law in the interim, books, films and other works by authors who died in 1961 will enter the public domain in the United Kingdom, the European Union and some other jurisdictions; those published in 1936 will enter the public domain in the United States.
- January 15–February 1 — The 2032 European Men's Handball Championship is expected to be held in France and Germany.
- April — The 2032 French presidential election is scheduled to be held, no less than 35 days after the five-year term starting in 2027 expires.
- June–July — Turkey and Italy are expected to co-host the UEFA Euro 2032.
- July 23–August 8 — The 2032 Summer Olympics is expected to be held in Brisbane, Queensland, Australia.
- August 24–September 5 — The 2032 Summer Paralympics is expected to be held in Brisbane.
- November 2 — The 2032 United States presidential election is scheduled to be held. The winners will be inaugurated on January 20, 2033.
- November 13 — A transit of Mercury will occur.
- December 1–December 19 — The 2032 European Women's Handball Championship is expected to be held in Germany, Denmark, and Poland.
- December 22 — The asteroid 2024 YR4, which had an impact rating of 3 on the Torino scale from January 27, 2025 to February 20, 2025, will pass by Earth.

=== Date unknown ===
- The Korea Lunar Lander and Rover, a lunar lander currently under development in South Korea, is scheduled to be launched.
- LiteBIRD, a planned small space observatory that aims to study the cosmic microwave background, is planned to be launched.

== Predicted and scheduled events ==
- January 1 — Assuming no further extensions to the term of copyrights become law in the interim, books, films and other works by authors who died in 1961 will enter the public domain in the United Kingdom, the European Union and some other jurisdictions; those published in 1936 will enter the public domain in the United States.
- January 15–February 1 — The 2032 European Men's Handball Championship is expected to be held in France and Germany.
- April — The 2032 French presidential election is scheduled to be held, no less than 35 days after the five-year term starting in 2027 expires.
- June–July — Turkey and Italy are expected to co-host the UEFA Euro 2032.
- July 23–August 8 — The 2032 Summer Olympics is expected to be held in Brisbane, Queensland, Australia.
- August 24–September 5 — The 2032 Summer Paralympics is expected to be held in Brisbane.
- November 2 — The 2032 United States presidential election is scheduled to be held. The winners will be inaugurated on January 20, 2033.
- November 13 — A transit of Mercury will occur.
- December 1–December 19 — The 2032 European Women's Handball Championship is expected to be held in Germany, Denmark, and Poland.
- December 22 — The asteroid 2024 YR4, which had an impact rating of 3 on the Torino scale from January 27, 2025 to February 20, 2025, will pass by Earth.

=== Date unknown ===
- The Korea Lunar Lander and Rover, a lunar lander currently under development in South Korea, is scheduled to be launched.
- LiteBIRD, a planned small space observatory that aims to study the cosmic microwave background, is planned to be launched.

== Predicted and scheduled events ==
- January 1 — Assuming no further extensions to the term of copyrights become law in the interim, books, films and other works by authors who died in 1961 will enter the public domain in the United Kingdom, the European Union and some other jurisdictions; those published in 1936 will enter the public domain in the United States.
- January 15–February 1 — The 2032 European Men's Handball Championship is expected to be held in France and Germany.
- April — The 2032 French presidential election is scheduled to be held, no less than 35 days after the five-year term starting in 2027 expires.
- June–July — Turkey and Italy are expected to co-host the UEFA Euro 2032.
- July 23–August 8 — The 2032 Summer Olympics is expected to be held in Brisbane, Queensland, Australia.
- August 24–September 5 — The 2032 Summer Paralympics is expected to be held in Brisbane.
- November 2 — The 2032 United States presidential election is scheduled to be held. The winners will be inaugurated on January 20, 2033.
- November 13 — A transit of Mercury will occur.
- December 1–December 19 — The 2032 European Women's Handball Championship is expected to be held in Germany, Denmark, and Poland.
- December 22 — The asteroid 2024 YR4, which had an impact rating of 3 on the Torino scale from January 27, 2025 to February 20, 2025, will pass by Earth.

=== Date unknown ===
- The Korea Lunar Lander and Rover, a lunar lander currently under development in South Korea, is scheduled to be launched.
- LiteBIRD, a planned small space observatory that aims to study the cosmic microwave background, is planned to be launched.

== Predicted and scheduled events ==
- January 1 — Assuming no further extensions to the term of copyrights become law in the interim, books, films and other works by authors who died in 1961 will enter the public domain in the United Kingdom, the European Union and some other jurisdictions; those published in 1936 will enter the public domain in the United States.
- January 15–February 1 — The 2032 European Men's Handball Championship is expected to be held in France and Germany.
- April — The 2032 French presidential election is scheduled to be held, no less than 35 days after the five-year term starting in 2027 expires.
- June–July — Turkey and Italy are expected to co-host the UEFA Euro 2032.
- July 23–August 8 — The 2032 Summer Olympics is expected to be held in Brisbane, Queensland, Australia.
- August 24–September 5 — The 2032 Summer Paralympics is expected to be held in Brisbane.
- November 2 — The 2032 United States presidential election is scheduled to be held. The winners will be inaugurated on January 20, 2033.
- November 13 — A transit of Mercury will occur.
- December 1–December 19 — The 2032 European Women's Handball Championship is expected to be held in Germany, Denmark, and Poland.
- December 22 — The asteroid 2024 YR4, which had an impact rating of 3 on the Torino scale from January 27, 2025 to February 20, 2025, will pass by Earth.

=== Date unknown ===
- The Korea Lunar Lander and Rover, a lunar lander currently under development in South Korea, is scheduled to be launched.
- LiteBIRD, a planned small space observatory that aims to study the cosmic microwave background, is planned to be launched.
