= 2032 =

2032 in various calendars
- Gregorian calendar: 2032; MMXXXII
- Ab urbe condita: 2785
- Armenian calendar: 1481; ԹՎ ՌՆՁԱ
- Assyrian calendar: 6782
- Baháʼí calendar: 188–189
- Balinese saka calendar: 1953–1954
- Bengali calendar: 1438–1439
- Berber calendar: 2982
- British Regnal year: N/A
- Buddhist calendar: 2576
- Burmese calendar: 1394
- Byzantine calendar: 7540–7541
- Chinese calendar: 辛亥年 (Metal Pig); 4729 or 4522 — to — 壬子年 (Water Rat); 4730 or 4523
- Coptic calendar: 1748–1749
- Discordian calendar: 3198
- Ethiopian calendar: 2024–2025
- Hebrew calendar: 5792–5793
- Hindu calendars
- Vikram Samvat: 2088–2089
- Shaka Samvat: 1953–1954
- Kali Yuga: 5132–5133
- Holocene calendar: 12032
- Igbo calendar: 1032–1033
- Iranian calendar: 1410–1411
- Islamic calendar: 1453–1454
- Japanese calendar: Reiwa 14 (令和１４年)
- Javanese calendar: 1965–1966
- Juche calendar: 121
- Julian calendar: Gregorian minus 13 days
- Korean calendar: 4365
- Minguo calendar: ROC 121 民國121年
- Nanakshahi calendar: 564
- Thai solar calendar: 2575
- Tibetan calendar: ལྕགས་མོ་ཕག་ལོ་ (female Iron-Boar); 2158 or 1777 or 1005 — to — ཆུ་ཕོ་བྱི་བ་ལོ་ (male Water-Rat); 2159 or 1778 or 1006
- Unix time: 1956528000 – 1988150399

2032 (MMXXXII) will be a leap year starting on Thursday of the Gregorian calendar, the 2032nd year of the Common Era (CE) and Anno Domini (AD) designations, the 32nd year of the 3rd millennium and the 21st century, and the 3rd year of the 2030s decade.

== Predicted and scheduled events ==
- January 1 – Assuming no further extensions to the term of copyrights become law in the interim, books, films and other works by authors who died in 1961 will enter the public domain in the United Kingdom, the European Union and some other jurisdictions; those published in 1936, will enter the public domain in the United States.
- January 15–February 1 – The 2032 European Men's Handball Championship is expected to be held in France and Germany.
- February 22 – The 300th birthday of the late George Washington.
- March 19 – 100th anniversary of the Sydney Harbour Bridge.
- April – The 2032 French presidential election is scheduled to be held, no less than 35 days after the five-year term starting in 2027 expires.
- June–July – Turkey and Italy are expected to co-host the UEFA Euro 2032.
- July 23–August 8 – The 2032 Summer Olympics is scheduled to be held in Brisbane, Queensland, Australia.
- August 24–September 5 – The 2032 Summer Paralympics is expected to be held in Brisbane.
- November 2 – The 2032 United States presidential election is scheduled to be held. The winners will be inaugurated on January 20, 2033.
- November 13 – A transit of Mercury will occur.
- December 1–19 – The 2032 European Women's Handball Championship is expected to be held in Germany, Denmark, and Poland.
- December 22 – The asteroid 2024 YR4, which had an impact rating of 3 on the Torino scale from January 27, 2025 to February 20, 2025, will pass by Earth.

=== Date unknown ===
- The Korea Lunar Lander and Rover, a lunar lander currently under development in South Korea, is planned to be launched.
- LiteBIRD, a planned small space observatory that aims to study the cosmic microwave background, is planned to be launched.
