= Erminia Calabrese =

Italian astronomer (born 1984)

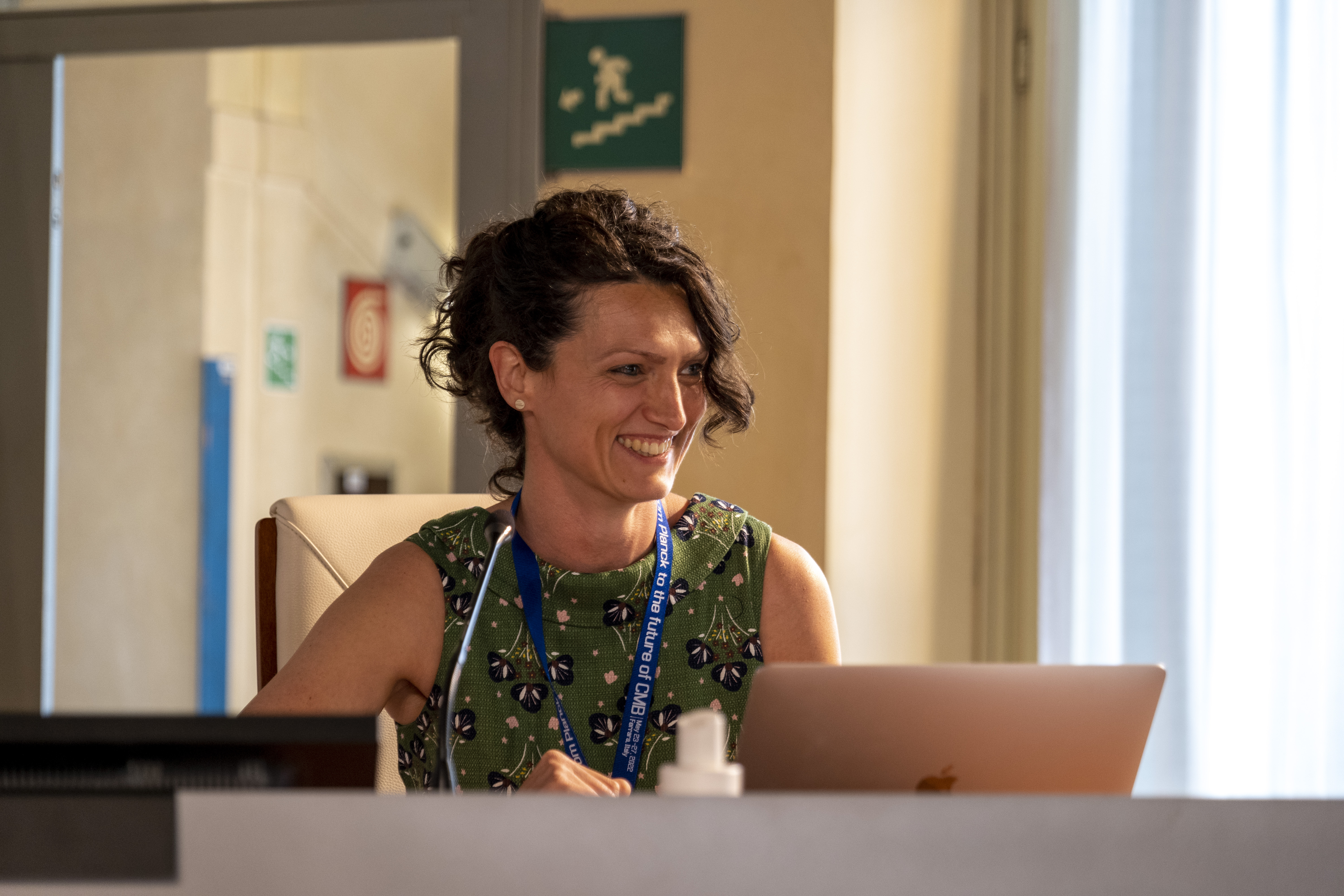
- Born: 26 November 1984 (age 41)
- Education: Sapienza University of Rome
- Scientific career
- Fields: Cosmology
- Workplaces: University of Oxford; Princeton University; Cardiff University

Erminia Calabrese, FLSW, is an Italian astronomer. She is a Professor of Astronomy and the Director of Research at Cardiff University School of Physics and Astronomy. She works in observational cosmology using the cosmic microwave background radiation to understand the origins and evolution of the universe. In 2024 she became a Fellow of the Learned Society of Wales, and in 2022 she was awarded the Institute of Physics Fred Hoyle medal and the Learned Society of Wales Dillwyn medal.

== Early life and education ==
Calabrese was born in Benevento, Italy and grew up in a small town in the Apennines, Cerreto Sannita. She left to attend the Sapienza University of Rome and graduated in 2006 with a degree in Physics and Astrophysics. She stayed at the Sapienza University of Rome for her postgraduate studies, where she first earned a Masters degree in Astronomy and Astrophysics in 2008 and then went on to complete a PhD in Astronomy in 2012.

== Research and career ==
Calabrese moved to the Oxford Astrophysics department in 2012, for a Research Associate position in cosmology, where she was advised by astrophysicist Joanna Dunkley. Calabrese went on to be a Beecroft Fellow at the University of Oxford from 2014 to 2015 before moving on to become a Lyman Spitzer Jr. Fellow at Princeton University from 2015 to 2016. In 2017, she became a Science and Technology Facilities Council Ernest Rutherford Fellow at the University of Oxford before moving to Cardiff in order to establish a cosmology group at Cardiff University. She started as a Lecturer at Cardiff University in 2017 and was promoted to Professor in 2019. As of 2024, Calabrese is the Director of Research for the School of Physics and Astronomy at Cardiff University.

Calabrese’s research combines theoretical work with statistical data analysis to answer fundamental questions about the Universe. As a Scientist of the Planck mission and a science member of the Atacama Cosmology Telescope she led work on characterising multi-frequency CMB microwave data, on combining data from satellite and ground-based experiments, and on extracting the underlying primordial CMB signal carrying the imprint of the physics of the early Universe, leading to state-of-the-art constraints on neutrino physics, inflation, dark matter and dark energy physics. Calabrese and her cosmology team are now exploring new physics signatures in CMB polarisation with future observations from the Simons Observatory and the proposed, Japanese-led LiteBIRD mission. Calabrese is also a member of the LSST Dark Energy Science Collaboration, and a member of the Euclid Collaboration, looking at how to combine low-redshift data with the CMB. She has been featured on several podcasts and shows explaining her research, including BBC Sky at Night Magazine, Physics World Weekly, Radio3 Scienza and the BBC Science Café.

== Awards and honours ==
- 2024 Learned Society of Wales Fellowship.
- 2023 UK Space Agency award for LiteBIRD:UK.
- 2022 UKRI/STFC awards for SO:UK
- 2022 Institute of Physics Fred Hoyle Medal and Prize, Learned Society of Wales Dillwyn Medal and Prize for STEMM.
- 2021 H2020 Marie Sklodowska-Curie Actions Research and Innovation Staff Exchange (RISE) consortium grant
- 2019 European Research Council Starting Grant.
- 2019 Giuseppe and Vanna Cocconi Prize for the Planck Team.
- 2018 Gruber prize in cosmology as a member of the Planck team.
- 2018 Royal Astronomical Society Group Achievement Award for the Planck Team.
- 2018 Marcel Grossman Award to the Planck scientific collaboration.
- 2016 STFC Ernest Rutherford Fellowship
- 2012 Junior Research Fellowship (non-stipendiary), Wolfson College, Oxford.
- 2011 Tito Maiani prize for thesis in physics.
