= Fred Hoyle Medal and Prize =

Physics award

- Awarded for: Astrophysics, gravitational physics, or cosmology
- Sponsored by: Institute of Physics
- Rewards: Silver medal, £1000
- First award: 2008
- Website: http://www.iop.org/about/awards/

The Fred Hoyle Medal and Prize was established in 2008 by the Institute of Physics of London for distinguished contributions to astrophysics, gravitational physics or cosmology. The medal is named after astronomer Fred Hoyle who formulated the theory of stellar nucleosynthesis. The medal is made of silver and is accompanied by a prize and a certificate. The medal is awarded (approximately) biennially. For a full list of Hoyle Prize recipients see https://www.iop.org/about/awards/silver-subject-medals/fred-hoyle-medal-and-prize-recipients.

== Recipients of the medal and prize ==
The following have won the award:

- 2026: Ofer Lahav, for pioneering AI for astronomy from the early 1990s, and for scientific leadership in developing and exploiting the Dark Energy Survey
- 2024: Isabelle Baraffe, for the structure and evolution of stars and planets
- 2022: Erminia Calabrese, for observational cosmology using the Cosmic Microwave Background
- 2021: Roger Davies, for seminal contributions to understanding the nature and evolution of early-type galaxies and developing their use as cosmological probes.
- 2019: Gilles Chabrier, for a variety of astrophysical domains
- 2018: Hiranya Peiris, for cosmic structure
- 2017: Jane Greaves, for planet formation and exoplanet habitability
- 2016: Sheila Rowan, for laser interferometers
- 2014: Anthony Raymond Bell, for cosmic rays
- 2012: David H. Lyth, for particle cosmology
- 2010: Carlos S. Frenk, for cold dark matter modelling
- 2008: Michael Rowan-Robinson, for infrared and submillimetre astronomy

== See also ==
- Institute of Physics Awards
- List of physics awards
- List of awards named after people
