= Michael Rowan-Robinson =

British astronomer (born 1942)

Michael Rowan-Robinson FRAS FInstP
- Born: Geoffrey Michael Rowan-Robinson; 9 July 1942; England
- Education: Eshton Hall School
- Alma mater: University of Cambridge (BA); Royal Holloway, University of London (PhD)
- Awards: Fred Hoyle Medal and Prize (2008)
- Scientific career
- Institutions: Imperial College London; Gresham College
- Thesis: On the structure and distribution of quasi-stellar radio-sources (1969)
- Doctoral advisor: William McCrea
- Doctoral students: Brian May
- Website: astro.ic.ac.uk/home/mrrobinson

Geoffrey Michael Rowan-Robinson FRAS FInstP (born 9 July 1942) is an astronomer, astrophysicist and Professor of Astrophysics at Imperial College London. He previously served as head of the astrophysics group until May 2007 and from 1981 to 1982, and as Gresham Professor of Astronomy.

== Education ==
Rowan-Robinson was educated at Eshton Hall School and the University of Cambridge where he completed a Bachelor of Arts degree in Natural Sciences as an undergraduate student of Pembroke College, Cambridge. He went on to complete a PhD on Quasars at Royal Holloway, University of London in 1969 supervised by William McCrea.

== Research and career ==
Rowan-Robinson's research interests include the Spitzer Space Telescope SWIRE project, the European Large Area ISO Survey, the UK SCUBA Survey (see James Clerk Maxwell Telescope), the IRAS PSC Redshift Survey, the Herschel Space Observatory SPIRE instrument and the Planck Surveyor HFI.

Rowan-Robinson co-supervised Brian May's PhD in Astrophysics initially supervised by James Ring and Ken Reay. He was President of the Royal Astronomical Society from 2006 to 2008.

In November 2021 he published an article on the Monthly Notices of the Royal Astronomical Society regarding the search for Planet Nine using IRAS data.

=== Publications ===
His publications and books include:

- The Cosmological Distance Ladder
- Universe
- Ripples in the Cosmos
- The Nine Numbers of the Cosmos
- Cosmology

=== Awards and honours ===
Rowan-Robinson was awarded the 2008 Hoyle Medal by the Institute of Physics for his research in infrared and submillimetre astronomy, and observational cosmology.

The asteroid 4599 Rowan, discovered in 1985 by Henri Debehogne at the European Southern Observatory, was renamed "Rowan" to honor Michael Rowan-Robinson. The credit notes that, even though Rowan-Robinson's contributions have been in extragalactic astronomy, he was able to use data from IRAS to set a limit on the number of undiscovered Jupiter-like planets beyond the orbit of Neptune.
