= Julie Fitzpatrick =

Scottish scientist and academic

Julie Fitzpatrick CBE FRSE
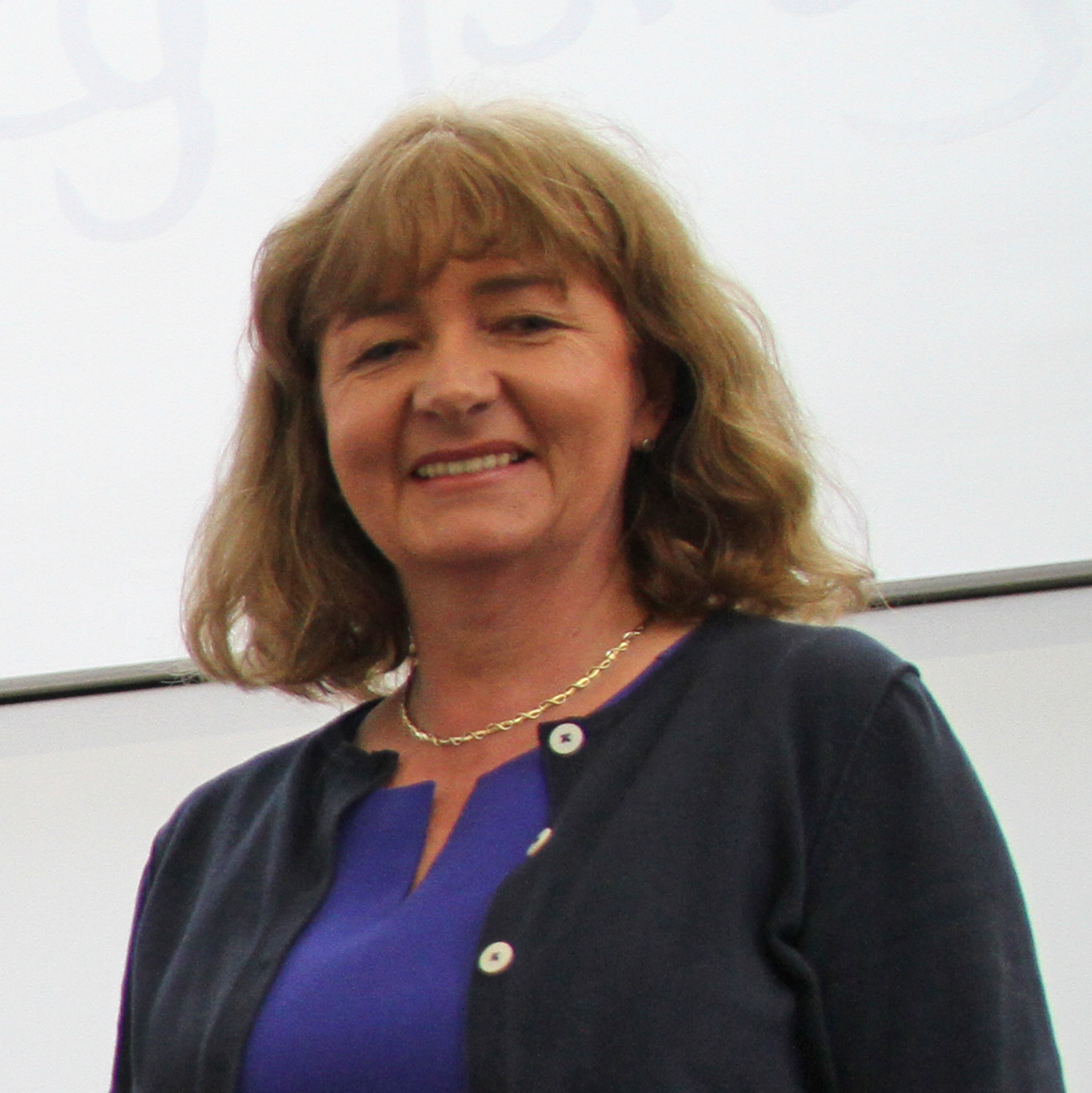
- Education: University of Glasgow; University of Bristol; London School of Hygiene and Tropical Medicine
- Employer: Scottish Government
- Known for: Scotland's Chief Scientific Advisor and former Director of the Moredun Research Institute

Julie Lydia Fitzpatrick CBE FRSE is a Scottish scientist and academic. She was Scotland's Chief Scientific Advisor from June 2021 to August 2025, and formerly Director of the Moredun Research Institute.

== Life ==
Fitzpatrick studied to become a vet at the University of Glasgow and she gained her doctorate at the University of Bristol. Her masters degree in Epidemiology is from the London School of Hygiene and Tropical Medicine.

Fitzpatrick has a long association with the Moredun Research Institute and was Scientific Director of the Institute and CEO of The Moredun Foundation at the time of her retirement in September 2023. She was a member of the Edinburgh Infectious Diseases network. She holds a Chair in Food Security at the University of Glasgow’s College of Medicine, Veterinary Medicine and Life Sciences.

In 2021 she became Scotland's Chief Scientific Advisor and ex-officio member of the Scottish Science Advisory Council. This is a part-time role and leads the provision of scientific advice to the Scottish Government. She took over from physicist Sheila Rowan in June 2021. Her term of office will end in September 2025.

As the Scottish Government's advisor she attended Scientific Advisory Group for Emergencies (SAGE) meetings during the COVID-19 pandemic in Scotland to advise on possible future scenarios.

== Awards and honours ==
She was elected a Fellow of the Royal Society of Edinburgh in 2007 and a Fellow of the Royal Agricultural Society of Scotland in 2008.

Fitzpatrick was awarded an OBE for "services to livestock research" in 2014 and a CBE for "services to Science" in 2025.
