= Jane Greaves =

British astronomer

- Occupation: Astronomer

Academic background
- Education: University of Oxford; Queen Mary University of London

Jane Greaves is a British astronomer who is based at Cardiff University. While at the University of St Andrews she led the team which discovered a protoplanet within the protoplanetary disk around the young star HL Tauri.

In 2017, she was awarded the Fred Hoyle Medal and Prize of the Institute of Physics for her "significant contribution to our understanding of planet formation and exoplanet habitability through her seminal imaging of debris discs around Sun-like stars and solar system bodies using far-infrared telescopes".

In 2018, she announced preliminary results from studies of the presence of phosphorus in supernova remnants, indicating that the level of phosphorus in the Crab Nebula is much lower than in Cassiopeia A, leading to speculations that a paucity of phosphorus might limit the formation of alien life.

On 14 September 2020 her team announced the discovery of phosphine in the atmosphere of Venus. Subsequent analysis led Greaves' team to reduce their initial estimates of phosphine levels, with some astronomers disputing the presence of phosphine entirely.
