= Sheila Rowan (physicist) =

Professor of Physics, Chief Scientific Advisor to the Scottish Government

Sheila Rowan CBE FRS FRSE FInstP
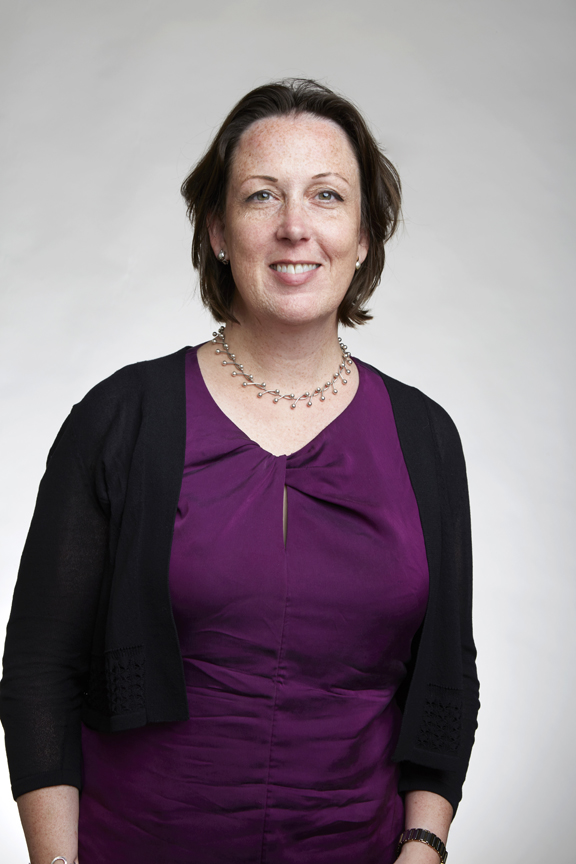
- Sheila Rowan at the Royal Society admissions day in London, July 2018
- Born: 25 November 1969 (age 56); Dumfries, Dumfriesshire, Scotland
- Education: University of Glasgow (BSc, PhD)
- Awards: Philip Leverhulme Prize (2005); Hoyle Medal and Prize (2016); Suffrage Science award (2017)
- Scientific career
- Workplaces: University of Glasgow; Stanford University
- Thesis: Aspects of lasers for the illumination of interferometric gravitational wave detectors (1995)
- Doctoral advisor: James Hough
- Website: gla.ac.uk/schools/physics/staff/sheilarowan

Sheila Rowan (born 25 November 1969) is a Scottish physicist and academic, who is Professor of Physics and Astronomy at the University of Glasgow in Scotland, and director of its Institute for Gravitational Research since 2009. She is known for her work in advancing the detection of gravitational waves. In 2016, Rowan was appointed the (part-time) Chief Scientific Advisor to the Scottish Government. She is a Fellow of the Royal Society of Edinburgh, the Institute of Physics, and the Royal Society. She has been awarded the Philip Leverhulme Prize for Astronomy and Astrophysics, and the Fred Hoyle Medal and Prize. She was appointed MBE in 2011 and promoted to CBE in 2021.

== Education ==
Rowan was born on 25 November 1969 in Dumfries, Dumfriesshire, Scotland. She was educated at Maxwelltown High School, a comprehensive school in Dumfries. She studied physics at the University of Glasgow, graduating with a Bachelor of Science (BSc) degree in 1991 and a Doctor of Philosophy (PhD) degree in 1995. Her PhD was research on gravitational waves and was supervised by James Hough.

== Career ==
After her PhD, Rowan's work was split between the University of Glasgow and the Edward Ginzton Laboratory at Stanford University. Since 2003, she has been based solely in Glasgow, and in 2006 was appointed Professor of Experimental Physics. Rowan's research has focused on developing optical materials for use in gravitational wave detectors. She led a team which worked on the international Laser Interferometer Gravitational-Wave Observatory (LIGO) collaboration. This collaboration led in September 2015 to the detection of gravitational waves for the first time after Albert Einstein's prediction.

In June 2016, Rowan was seconded (part-time) to chief scientific advisor to the Scottish Government, a position vacant since December 2014, when Muffy Calder stood down. In June 2021 she stepped down from this role and became the President of the Institute of Physics, taking up her post on 1 October 2021. She was succeeded by Julie FitzPatrick who took up the post of Scotland's Chief Scientific Adviser on 14 June 2021.

== Awards and honours ==
- Rowan was elected a Fellow of the Royal Society of Edinburgh (FRSE) in 2008 and a Fellow of the Royal Society (FRS) in 2018.
- Rowan was awarded the Philip Leverhulme Prize for Astronomy and Astrophysics in 2005, elected a Fellow of the Institute of Physics (FInstP) in 2006 and awarded Fellowship of the American Physical Society in 2012. She was awarded the Fred Hoyle Medal and Prize of the Institute of Physics in 2016 in recognition of her pioneering research on aspects of the technology of gravitational wave observatories.
- In 2016, Rowan and her team contributed to the 2016 Special Breakthrough Prize in Fundamental Physics, for their work on the first detection of gravitational waves, which was announced in February 2016.
- In 2016, Rowan was among a team of researches to be awarded the President's Medal by the Royal Society of Edinburgh.
- In 2017, Rowan won the Suffrage Science award
- In July 2019, Rowan was elected to the role of president-elect by the Institute of Physics. She took up the post of President on 1 October 2021.
- In 2020, Rowan won the Sir Harold Hartley Medal by the Institute of Measurement and Control for outstanding contribution to the technology of measurement and control.
- Rowan was appointed Member of the Order of the British Empire (MBE) in the 2011 Birthday Honours, and promoted to Commander of the Order of the British Empire (CBE) in the 2021 New Year Honours for services to science.

== Patents ==
- Rowan was awarded a patent for silicon carbide bonding in 2010 by the European Patent Office. The patent covers a novel method for bonding silicon carbide components to themselves and to other materials.

== Sources ==
This article incorporates text available under the CC BY 4.0 license.
