= Gilles Chabrier =

French astronomer

- Education: École normale supérieure de Lyon (PhD)
- Awards: Prix Jean Ricard (2010); Eddington Medal (2012); Ampère Prize (2014); Fred Hoyle Medal and Prize (2019); Gold Medal of the Royal Astronomical Society (2024)
- Scientific career
- Fields: Astrophysics
- Workplaces: University of Exeter
- Thesis: Contribution à l'étude des fluides coulombiens: application au cas des mélanges chargés alcalins-halogénures alcalins (1985)
- Doctoral advisor: Jean-Pierre Hansen

Gilles Chabrier is a French astrophysicist who is best known for his work on brown dwarfs. He is currently a professor of astronomy at the University of Exeter.

== Life and scientific work ==
Gilles Chabrier was born on 30 June 1955 in Lyon. He studied physics at the École normale supérieure (ENS). After completing his PhD he continued his research at the University of Rochester. In the early 1990s he built up a research group at the École normale supérieure de Lyon (ENS-Lyon) in collaboration with the nearby Lyon Observatory. In 1995, the Centre de recherche astronomique de Lyon was founded, known as the Centre de Recherche Astrophysics Lyon (CRAL) since 2007. Chabrier continued to lead one of the research groups at CRAL until his retirement. He now an emeritus researcher at the Centre national de la recherche scientifique (CNRS).

Before the discovery of brown dwarfs in 1995, Chabrier helped develop the theory of their structure in collaboration with Isabelle Baraffe, France Allard and Didier Saumon.

== Awards ==
- 2006 CNRS Silver Medal
- 2010 Jean Ricard Prize
- 2012 Eddington Medal
- 2014 Ampère Prize
- 2019 Fred Hoyle Medal and Prize
- 2024 Gold Medal of the Royal Astronomical Society
