= Isabelle Baraffe =

French physicist and academic

- Education: University of Göttingen
- Scientific career
- Workplaces: University of Exeter; École normale supérieure de Lyon; Max Planck Institute for Astrophysics; University of Göttingen
- Thesis: Evolution d'etoiles massives de faible metallicite et de metallicite nulle (1997)
- Doctoral advisor: Jean Audouze

Isabelle Baraffe is a French physicist who is a professor of astrophysics at the University of Exeter. Her research involves the development of new astrophysical models to understand low mass stars and exoplanets. She was awarded a Royal Society Wolfson Research Merit Award in 2010 and delivered the 2023 European Astronomical Society Lodewijk Woltjer Lecture.

== Early life and education ==
Baraffe was born in France. She completed her master's degree in physics at the Paris Diderot University. She remained there for her doctoral research, studying jointly at the University of Göttingen. Her research considered the evolution of non-metallic stars. She was a postdoctoral researcher at the Max Planck Institute for Astrophysics and the University of Göttingen.

== Research and career ==
Baraffe joined the École normale supérieure de Lyon.? She moved to the Centre de Recherche Astrophysique de Lyon as a professor of astrophysics. In 2010, Baraffe joined the University of Exeter. Her research considers stellar hydrodynamics and exoplanets. Barafee has developed theoretical models to explore low mass stars and substellar objects, including brown dwarfs and exoplanets. The scientific community first became interested in low mass stars after the first report of brown dwarfs in 1995 (Gliese 229b), and Baraffe's reference models were used to create plans for observations. Baraffe pioneered the theoretical foundations of exoplanets, and her calculations have been used to understand observational data from the James Webb Space Telescope and Extremely Large Telescope.

She developed numerical tools that combine computational approaches with complex physics to study the dynamics of astrophysics. Her three-dimensional code MUSIC (MUlti-dimensional Stellar Implicit Code) can predict fundamental astrophysical processes and was awarded two European Research Council grants. She developed the field of asteroseismology – the use of pulsation modes to investigate the study of the inside of stars.

== Awards and honours ==
- 1999 Centre National de la Recherche Scientifique Bronze Medal
- 2004 Astrophysikalisches Institut Potsdam Johann WEMPE Prize
- 2005 Gauss-Professorship
- 2010 Royal Society Wolfson Research Merit Award
- 2015 Max Planck Institute for Astrophysics Biermann lectures
- 2018 Elected to the Science and Technology Facilities Council Council
- 2020 Viktor Ambartsumian International Science Prize
- 2023 European Astronomical Society Lodewijk Woltjer Lecture
- 2024 Institute of Physics Fred Hoyle Medal and Prize

== Selected publications ==
- Baraffe I.; Homeier D.; Allard F.; Chabrier G. (2015). "New evolutionary models for pre-main sequence and main sequence low-mass stars down to the hydrogen-burning limit". Astronomy & Astrophysics. 577: 42–42. arXiv:1503.04107. Bibcode:2015A&A...577A..42B. doi:10.1051/0004-6361/201425481. ISSN 0004-6361. Wikidata Q69087769.
- Baraffe I.; Chabrier G.; Allard F.; Hauschildt P. H. (1998). "Evolutionary models for solar metallicity low-mass stars: mass-magnitude relationships and color-magnitude diagrams". Astronomy & Astrophysics. 337: 403–412. Bibcode:1998A&A...337..403B. ISSN 0004-6361. Wikidata Q68502388.
- I. Baraffe; G. Chabrier; T. S. Barman; F. Allard; P. H. Hauschildt (14 April 2003). "Evolutionary models for cool brown dwarfs and extrasolar giant planets. The case of HD 209458". Astronomy & Astrophysics. 402 (2): 701–712. arXiv:astro-ph/0302293. Bibcode:2003A&A...402..701B. doi:10.1051/0004-6361:20030252. ISSN 0004-6361. Wikidata Q55880233.
