= 2032 Summer Paralympics =

Multi-parasport event in Brisbane, Australia

XIX Paralympic Games
- Location: Brisbane, Australia
- Opening: 24 August 2032
- Closing: 5 September 2032
- Stadium: Brisbane Stadium

The 2032 Summer Paralympics, also known as the Brisbane 2032 Summer Paralympic Games, and branded as Brisbane 2032, will be the 19th edition of the Summer Paralympic Games, an international multi-sport parasports event governed by the International Paralympic Committee. The Games are scheduled to be held in Brisbane, Queensland, Australia, from 24 August to 5 September 2032.

It will be the second Summer Paralympics held in Australia, following the 2000 Summer Paralympics in Sydney, New South Wales.

== Bids ==
As per the agreement between the International Olympic Committee and the International Paralympic Committee in 2001, a city which wins the Olympic Games host bid will also stage the Paralympic Games.

== Development and preparation ==
Brisbane Organising Committee for the 2032 Olympic and Paralympic Games was established by the Queensland Government to plan, organise and deliver the Olympic and Paralympic Games in accordance with the host contract".

=== Transportation ===
In November 2022, advocates including Paralympian Karni Liddell raised concerns about Brisbane's preparedness to host the Paralympics in 2032, citing many instances where there was a lack of appropriate accessibility for people with disabilities throughout the city. Liddell implored Games organisers to consult the disability sector to enable the city to become fully accessible to those disabilities. Youngcare Connect manager Shane Jamieson also accused the city of being "completely ill-prepared" to host the Paralympics, stating that future development prior to 2032 would rely on consultation with people with disabilities. Queensland Human Rights Commissioner Scott McDougall said that Queensland was still lagging behind in relation to making public transport fully accessible to those with a disability, with 40% of railway stations in South East Queensland still only accessible by stairs.

== The Games ==
=== Sports ===
The initial sports programme is yet to be determined.

Various international sports federations and similar sanctioning bodies have announced plans to pursue bids for the addition of additional or optional sports to the 2032 Games:

- In July 2021, International Rugby League (IRL) declared an intent to campaign for the inclusion of rugby league in the 2032 Summer Olympics and Paralympics, focusing on wheelchair rugby league for the Paralympics and league nines for the Olympics.
- In 2024, cricketer Nathan Lyon said that he was wanting blind cricket to be included in the Paralympics, after standard cricket was selected as a sport for the 2028 Summer Olympics. Cricket Australia and Paralympics Australia have also indicated support for the sport's inclusion. In June 2025, International Paralympic Committee (IPC) president Andrew Parsons confirmed that a gold medal match held at The Gabba is a possibility should the sport be included.
- In July 2025, World Bowls and Bowls Australia jointly launched a campaign for the inclusion of lawn bowls in both the 2032 Olympics and Paralympics. If included in the Paralympics, the sport would be featured alongside related sport boccia.
- In December 2025, World Sailing submitted a proposal to reinstate para sailing, arguing that the sport has grown in participation since it was last featured. Sailing was a demonstration sport in 1996, before becoming an official sport from 2000 to 2016.
- In August 2026, the president of the International Blind Sports Federation, Ilgar Rahimov, said that the organisation was to work towards the inclusion of women's blind football through increasing the participation of women by supporting national teams and organising international competitions. Blind football has only had a men's competition since its inclusion in 2004.

== Marketing ==
=== Emblem ===
The emblem for the 2032 Summer Olympics and Paralympics was officially unveiled on 5 October 2026 in Riverside Green, South Bank. It was gradually revealed starting from 29 September with six "puzzle pieces" across the state of Queensland providing clues to the final design, culminating in the grand reveal ceremony in Brisbane. However, on 2 October, the final emblem design was accidentally leaked through a thumbnail on a video set to premiere on 5 October on the Brisbane 2032 official YouTube channel. In the description of the video, the design was described as "inspired by the spirited cockatoo – a symbol of Australia’s unique wildlife and playful heart" and that "the cockatoo’s crest is a living torch, reminiscent of the iconic Olympic and Paralympic flame. Shaped like Queensland, with its eye on Brisbane, the Emblem is a universal symbol to unite Brisbane, Australia and the world in 2032."

The last day of the reveal week was ultimately cancelled due to the leak, with the final two sections of the emblem being revealed on the Gold Coast instead. The full emblem was revealed online on 3 October 2026, two days earlier than planned. This was the first time that an emblem for the Paralympic Games was revealed in stages rather than as a whole, as well as the first to be leaked prior to its official unveiling. The emblems are designed by four agencies VML, Verian, Landor and BlackCard under "TeamFuture32 with custom typography done by Foster Type.

| Preceded by Los Angeles 2028 | Summer Paralympics; Brisbane; XIX Paralympic Summer Games (2032) | Succeeded by TBD 2036 |
