= Korea Lunar Lander and Rover =

Planned South Korean lunar lander

- Mission type: Lunar lander and rover
- Operator: Korea Aerospace Research Institute

Start of mission
- Rocket: KSLV-III
- Launch site: Naro Space Center
- Contractor: Korea Aerospace Research Institute

Moon lander

The Korea Lunar Lander and Rover is a lunar lander currently under development by South Korea, scheduled to be launched in 2032.

== Plan ==
The lunar lander is the second phase of the Korean Lunar Exploration Program, and is currently under development with a launch target of 2032, following the lunar orbiter Danuri launched in 2022. The goal of the second phase of the lunar exploration project is to independently develop a 1.8-ton lunar soft landing verification ship and lunar lander, and secure independent space exploration capabilities through lunar surface soft landing experiments and scientific and technological mission performance. This project, with a total project cost of 530.3 billion won, is scheduled to be carried out until the end of 2033.

The mission is expected to last approximately 14 days. The payload required for the lunar landing mission will be selected through a planning study based on scientific and technological needs, and will be decided along with the landing site.

== Development ==
On October 30, 2024, the Korea AeroSpace Administration and Korea Aerospace Research Institute signed an agreement for the second phase of the lunar exploration project (lunar lander development) and announced that it would begin the project in earnest. The main content is to invest approximately 530 billion won over 10 years to independently develop a lunar lander to be sent to the moon with the goal of landing on the moon in 2032.

KASA aims to complete the design of the lunar lander by 2028, launch the lunar soft landing verification probe in 2031, and launch the lunar lander in 2032.

== Lunar Rover ==
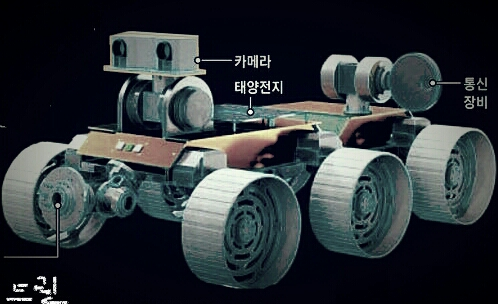
Korea Lunar Rover

The Korea lunar rover will be carried by the Korea lunar lander, after landing on the moon in 2032, it is scheduled to perform missions involving the collection and analysis of mineral samples.
