= 2032 European Women's Handball Championship =

2032 EHF European Women's Handball Championship
Tournament details
- Host countries: Denmark; Germany; Poland
- Dates: 2–19 December
- Teams: 24 (from 1 confederation)

The 2032 EHF European Women's Handball Championship, commonly referred to as the EHF EURO 2032, will be the 20th edition of the EHF European Women's Handball Championship, the biennial international women's handball championship of Europe organized by EHF. The tournament will be held in Denmark, Germany and Poland from 2 to 19 December 2032.

== Bid process ==
=== Bidding timeline ===
The bidding timeline is as follows:

| 2 August 2023 | Invitation to National Federations to provide a letter of intent to the EHF for hosting the EHF EUROs 2030 & 2032 |
| 1 November 2023 | Deadline for submitting the letter of intent and request for the bidding documents by the interested federations |
| November 2023 | Dispatch of the manual for staging the EHF EUROs 2030 & 2032 together with the relevant specifications and forms by the EHF |
| 1 June 2024 | Applications available at the EHF Office and deadline to submit a formal bid |
| 21 June 2024 | Approval of applications by EHF EXEC |
| July and September 2024 | Site inspections |
| End of September | Confirmation of bids for the EHF EUROs 2030 & 2032 |
| December 2024 | Allocation at the EO EHF Congress 2024 |

=== Bids ===
On 3 November 2023, it was announced that the following nations sent in an official expression of interest:

- Denmark
- Germany
- Montenegro
- Poland
- Serbia
- Switzerland

On 11 June 2024, the official bids were announced.

- Denmark/Germany/Poland

On 20 September 2024, the bid from Denmark, Germany and Poland was approved by the EHF. They won unopposed on 14 December.

==== Voting results ====
Country
| Country | Votes |
|---|---|
| Denmark & Germany & Poland | 40 |
| Against the bid | 0 |
| Total | 40 |

== Qualified teams ==
| Country | Qualified as | Qualified on | Previous appearances in tournament |
|---|---|---|---|
| Denmark | Co-host | 14 December 2024 | 18 (**1994**, **1996**, 1998, 2000, **2002**, 2004, 2006, 2008, 2010, 2012, 2014, 2016, 2018, 2020, 2022, 2024, 2026, 2028) |
| Germany | Co-host | 14 December 2024 | 16 (1994, 1996, 1998, 2000, 2002, 2004, 2006, 2008, 2010, 2012, 2014, 2016, 2018, 2020, 2022, 2024) |
| Poland | Co-host | 14 December 2024 | 10 (1996, 1998, 2006, 2014, 2016, 2018, 2020, 2022, 2024, 2026) |

Note: Bold indicates champion for that year. Italic indicates host for that year.

== Venues ==
While the German and Danish venues are undecided, the Polish part of the tournament will be at the Spodek in Katowice.
