= 2032 European Men's Handball Championship =

2032 EHF European Men's Handball Championship
Tournament details
- Host countries: France; Germany
- Venues: 6 (in 6 host cities)
- Dates: 15 January–1 February
- Teams: 24 (from 1 confederation)

The 2032 EHF European Men's Handball Championship, commonly referred to as the EHF EURO 2032, will be the 20th edition of the EHF European Men's Handball Championship, the biennial international men's handball championship of Europe organized by EHF. The tournament will be held in France and Germany from 15 January to 1 February 2032.

== Bid process ==
=== Bidding timeline ===
The bidding timeline was as follows:

2 August 2023	Invitation to National Federations to provide a letter of intent to the EHF for hosting the EHF EUROs 2030 & 2032
1 November 2023	Deadline for submitting the letter of intent and request for the bidding documents by the interested federations
November 2023	Dispatch of the manual for staging the EHF EUROs 2030 & 2032 together with the relevant specifications and forms by the EHF
1 June 2024	Applications available at the EHF Office and deadline to submit a formal bid
21 June 2024	Approval of applications by EHF EXEC
July and September 2024	Site inspections
End of September	Confirmation of bids for the EHF EUROs 2030 & 2032
December 2024	Allocation at the EO EHF Congress 2024

=== Bids ===
On 3 November 2023, it was announced that the following nations sent in an official expression of interest:

- Austria
- Croatia
- Estonia
- France
- Germany
- Slovenia
- Switzerland
- Turkey
- Spain

On 11 June 2024, the official bids were announced.

- Croatia (withdrew)
- France/Germany (formerly with Switzerland)
- Turkey (rejected)

On 20 September 2024, the Croatian and joint French–German bids were approved, while Turkey's bid failed to meet requirements and was eliminated by the EHF. However shortly before the host announcement, Croatia withdrew. France and Germany won unopposed on 14 December.

==== Voting results ====
Country
Country	Votes
France & Germany	39
Against the bid	0
Total	39

== Qualified teams ==
Country	Qualified as	Qualified on	Previous appearances in tournament
France	Co-host	14 December 2024	17 (1994, 1996, 1998, 2000, 2002, 2004, **2006**, 2008, **2010**, 2012, **2014**, 2016, 2018, 2020, 2022, **2024**, 2026)
Germany	Co-host	14 December 2024	15 (1994, 1996, 1998, 2000, 2002, **2004**, 2006, 2008, 2010, 2012, **2016**, 2018, 2020, 2022, 2024)

Note: Bold indicates champion for that year. Italic indicates host for that year.

== Venues ==
Six venues will host the tournament, four in Germany and two in France. Both countries will host a main round group and the final weekend will be in Germany.

- (France) Paris – Paris La Défense Arena
- (Germany) Cologne – Lanxess Arena
- (Germany) Munich – SAP Garden
