= LiteBIRD =

Planned Japanese small space observatory

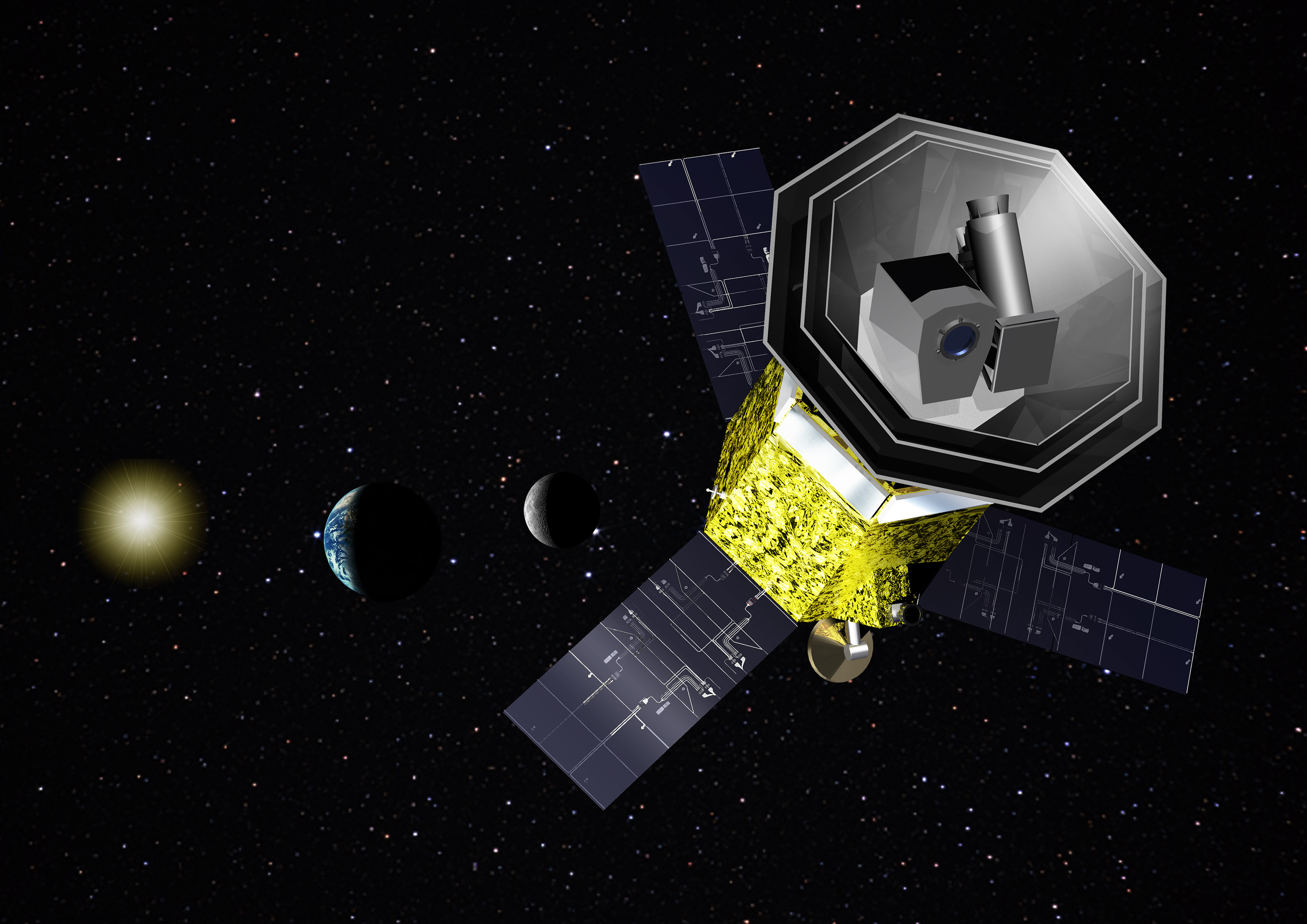
- Mission type: Space observation
- Operator: JAXA / ISAS
- Website: www.isas.jaxa.jp/en/missions/spacecraft/future/litebird.html
- Mission duration: Planned: 3 years

Spacecraft properties
- Manufacturer: Institute of Space and Astronautical Science
- Dry mass: Approx. 450 kg
- Power: < 500 W

Start of mission
- Launch date: 2036 (planned)
- Rocket: H3
- Launch site: Tanegashima LA-Y2
- Contractor: Mitsubishi Heavy Industries

Main telescope
- Diameter: LFT: 40 cm HFT: 20 cm
- Focal length: ~1,100 mm

Transponders
- Capacity: 10 Gb/day

Instruments
- Superconducting polarimeters
- Large-class Missions

LiteBIRD (Lite (Light) satellite for the studies of B-mode polarization and Inflation from cosmic background Radiation Detection) is a planned small space observatory that aims to detect the footprint of the primordial gravitational wave on the cosmic microwave background (CMB) in a form of polarization pattern called B-mode.

LiteBIRD and OKEANOS were the two finalists for Japan's second Large-Class Mission. In May 2019, LiteBIRD was selected by the Japanese space agency. LiteBIRD is planned to be launched in 2036 with an H3 launch vehicle for three years of observations at the Sun-Earth Lagrangian point L2.

== Overview ==
Cosmological inflation is the leading theory of the first instant of the universe, called the Big Bang theory. Inflation postulates that the universe underwent a period of rapid expansion an instant after its formation, and it provides a convincing explanation for cosmological observations. Inflation predicts that primordial gravitational waves were created during the inflationary era, about 10^{−38} second after the beginning of the universe. The primordial gravitational waves are expected to be imprinted in the CMB polarization map as special patterns, called the B-mode. Measurements of polarization of the CMB radiation are considered as the best probe to detect the primordial gravitational waves, that could bring a profound knowledge on how the Universe began, and may open a new era of testing theoretical predictions of quantum gravity, including those by the superstring theory.

The science goal of LiteBIRD is to measure the CMB polarization over the entire sky with the sensitivity of δr <0.001, which allows testing the major single-field slow-roll inflation models experimentally. The design concept is being studied by an international team of scientists from Japan, U.S., Canada and Europe.

== Telescopes ==
In order to separate CMB from the galactic emission, the measurements will cover 40 GHz to 400 GHz during a 3-year full sky survey using two telescopes on LiteBIRD. The Low Frequency Telescope (LFT) covers 40 GHz to 235 GHz, and the High Frequency Telescope (HFT) covers 280 GHz to 400 GHz. LFT has a 400 mm aperture Crossed-Dragone telescope, and HFT has a 200 mm aperture on-axis refractor with two silicon lenses. The baseline design considers an array of 2,622 superconducting polarimetric detectors. The detectors will be jointly developed by Italy, United Kingdom and the Netherlands. The entire optical system will be cooled down to approximately 5 K (−268.15 °C; −450.67 °F) to minimize the thermal emission, and the focal plane is cooled to 100 mK with a two-stage sub-Kelvin cooler.

== See also ==
- POLARBEAR
- BICEP and Keck Array
