= Miguel Hurtado =

Spanish software developer (born 1978)

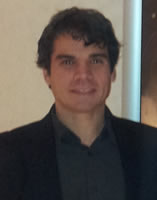
- Born: 22 April 1978 (age 48); Málaga
- Scientific career
- Fields: Astronomy
- Workplaces: La Sagra Observatory – La Sagra Sky Survey

Miguel Hurtado (born 22 April 1978 in Málaga, Spain) is a Spanish astronomer and a software developer at OAM's La Sagra Observatory, where he participated in the discovery of minor planets, comets, and supernovae.

Miguel Hurtado has listed the discovery of more than 2300 asteroids including 76 near-Earth objects such as 2012 DA14, as well as 5 comets and 19 supernovae. As of 2017, all numbered asteroids are credited by the Minor Planet Center to Mallorca Observatory, OAM. Jaime Nomen, his college and collaborator at the La Sagra Sky Survey (LSSS), was awarded the Shoemaker NEO Grant in 2010.

The main-belt asteroid 362911 Miguelhurtado, discovered at OAM–La Sagra Observatory in 2009, was named in his honor.

== Discoveries ==
=== Near-Earth asteroids ===
- 2013 PJ10
- (411611) 2011 QF_{14}
- (425450) 2010 EV_{45}
- (438908) 2009 XO
- (426071) 2012 CD_{29}
- (436654) 2011 RR_{12}

=== Comets ===
- P/2012 R2 (La Sagra)
- C/2012 B3 (La Sagra)
- P/2012 NJ (La Sagra)
- P/2012 S2 (La Sagra)
- C/2013 H1 (La Sagra)

=== Supernovae ===
- SN 2010ax
- SN 2010dt
- SN 2010gq
- SN 2010eu
- SN 2010gj
- SN 2010gs
- SN 2010hn
- SN 2010ij
- SN 2010ix
- SN 2010jf
- SN 2010jm
- SN 2010lo
- SN 2011ak
- SN 2011bm
- SN 2011bk
- SN 2011dz
- SN 2013ci
- SN 2013dv
- SN 2013dw

== See also ==
- List of minor planet discoverers § Mallorca
