= La Sagra Observatory =

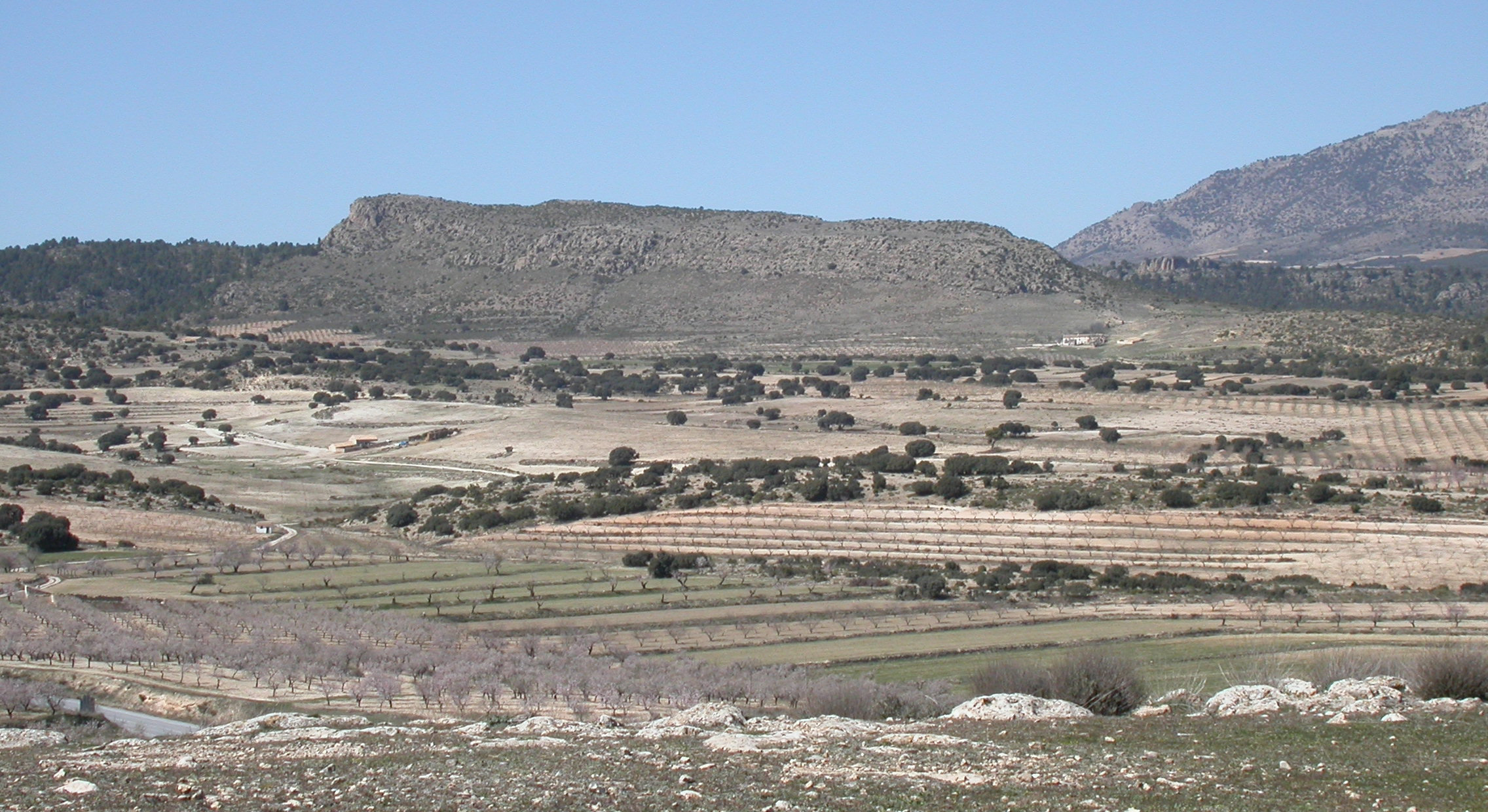
- Alternative names: Observatorio Astronómico de La Sagra
- Observatory code: J75
- Location: Puebla de Don Fadrique, Province of Granada, Andalusia, Spain
- Coordinates: 37°58′58″N 2°33′58″W
- Website: ols.iaa.csic.es
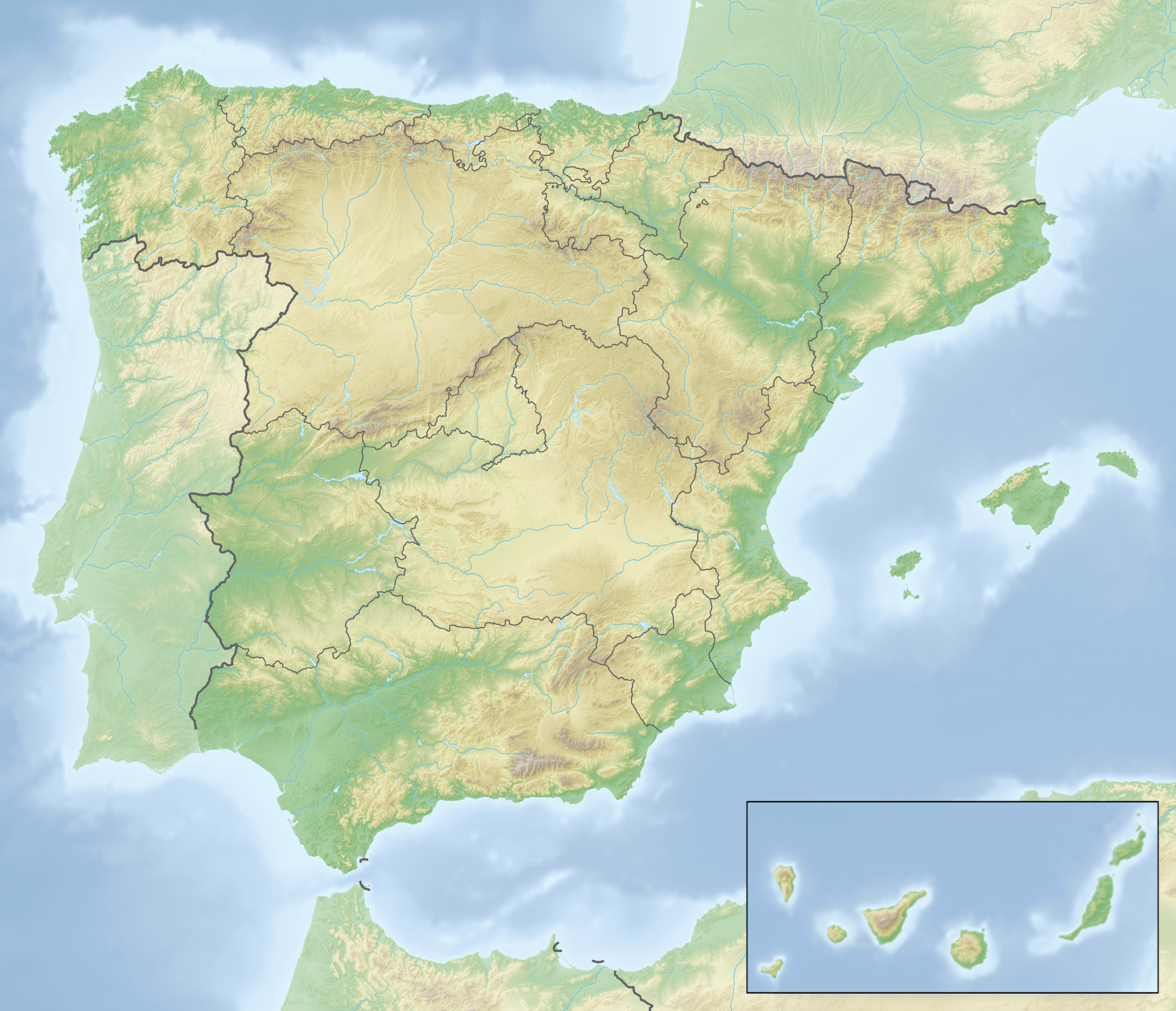
- Location of La Sagra Observatory

La Sagra Observatory (Spanish: Observatorio Astronómico de La Sagra; OLS; observatory code: L98) is an astronomical observatory located in the province of Granada, Spain. It uses four robotic telescopes both designed and built (hardware and software) by the scientists of the Observatorio Astronómico de Mallorca (OAM) who operate them remotely by telecontrol daily, discharging data from Mallorca using the Internet, to process them by means of algorithms designed "in house" which helped to detect asteroid 367943 Duende. among the other 1706 asteroids, with a 12th place in the ranking of asteroid discoveries. Its activities include, as part of its La Sagra Sky Survey, tracking small Solar System bodies, particularly near-Earth objects, and space debris.

== Duende ==
Among the asteroids discovered and tracked by Observatorio Astronómico de Mallorca thanks to its four remotely operated telescopes and to the clear skies of Sierra de la Sagra, on 15 February 2012, a team coordinated by Jaume Nomen, astronomer at OAM located the asteroid Duende, and calculated that the following year, more specifically on 15 February 2013, it would pass 27,700 km (17,200 mi) from Earth, the closest known distance an asteroid of that absolute magnitude has come to the planet, and well within the geosynchronous orbit, of the geosynchronous satellites at 35,786 km (22,236 mi).

== La Sagra Sky Survey ==
The La Sagra Sky Survey (LSSS) was an astronomical survey conducted at La Sagra Observatory. The numbered comets 233P/La Sagra, 279P/La Sagra and 324P/La Sagra were discovered by LSSS.

== See also ==
- Miguel Hurtado
