= List of minor planets: 426001–427000 =

The following is a partial list of minor planets, running from minor-planet number 426001 through 427000, inclusive. The primary data for this and other partial lists is based on JPL's "Small-Body Orbital Elements" and data available from the Minor Planet Center. Critical list information is also provided by the MPC, unless otherwise specified from Lowell Observatory. A detailed description of the table's columns and additional sources are given on the main page including a complete list of every page in this series, and a statistical break-up on the dynamical classification of minor planets.

Also see the summary list of all named bodies in numerical and alphabetical order, and the corresponding naming citations for the number range of this particular list. New namings may only be added to this list after official publication, as the preannouncement of names is condemned by the Working Group for Small Bodies Nomenclature of the International Astronomical Union.

Near-Earth obj.	MBA (inner)	MBA (outer)	Centaur
Mars-crosser	MBA (middle)	Jupiter trojan	Trans-Neptunian obj.
Unclassified

== 426001–426100 ==
Designation			Discovery			Properties		Ref
Permanent	Provisional	Named after	Date	Site	Discoverer(s)	Category	Diam.	Ref
426001	2011 JB_{12}	—	March 4, 2011	Mount Lemmon	Mount Lemmon Survey	·	1.6 km	MPC · JPL
426002	2011 JE_{13}	—	May 16, 2010	WISE	WISE	T_{j} (2.99)	3.5 km	MPC · JPL
426003	2011 JT_{20}	—	November 3, 2008	Mount Lemmon	Mount Lemmon Survey	·	1.8 km	MPC · JPL
426004	2011 JB_{31}	—	April 4, 2010	WISE	WISE	LIX	3.5 km	MPC · JPL
426005	2011 JE_{31}	—	May 12, 2011	Mount Lemmon	Mount Lemmon Survey	·	3.4 km	MPC · JPL
426006	2011 KS_{2}	—	November 18, 2008	Kitt Peak	Spacewatch	EOS	1.9 km	MPC · JPL
426007	2011 KZ_{6}	—	March 15, 2005	Catalina	CSS	·	3.1 km	MPC · JPL
426008	2011 KJ_{7}	—	April 13, 2011	Mount Lemmon	Mount Lemmon Survey	·	3.3 km	MPC · JPL
426009	2011 KV_{14}	—	May 23, 2006	Mount Lemmon	Mount Lemmon Survey	EOS	1.7 km	MPC · JPL
426010	2011 KN_{22}	—	May 26, 2006	Kitt Peak	Spacewatch	·	3.2 km	MPC · JPL
426011	2011 KF_{23}	—	October 20, 2008	Kitt Peak	Spacewatch	·	2.1 km	MPC · JPL
426012	2011 KN_{25}	—	January 17, 2005	Kitt Peak	Spacewatch	·	2.1 km	MPC · JPL
426013	2011 KQ_{28}	—	November 18, 2009	Mount Lemmon	Mount Lemmon Survey	·	1.8 km	MPC · JPL
426014	2011 KN_{31}	—	July 15, 2007	Siding Spring	SSS	·	4.0 km	MPC · JPL
426015	2011 KZ_{31}	—	January 23, 2006	Kitt Peak	Spacewatch	·	2.2 km	MPC · JPL
426016	2011 KL_{35}	—	May 19, 2010	WISE	WISE	·	2.4 km	MPC · JPL
426017	2011 KO_{42}	—	April 30, 2010	WISE	WISE	·	3.4 km	MPC · JPL
426018	2011 KT_{42}	—	April 5, 2011	Kitt Peak	Spacewatch	HYG	2.7 km	MPC · JPL
426019	2011 KC_{45}	—	May 26, 2010	WISE	WISE	·	5.0 km	MPC · JPL
426020	2011 LO	—	June 1, 2010	WISE	WISE	·	4.0 km	MPC · JPL
426021	2011 LO_{7}	—	March 11, 2005	Mount Lemmon	Mount Lemmon Survey	·	2.6 km	MPC · JPL
426022	2011 LP_{9}	—	February 8, 1999	Kitt Peak	Spacewatch	·	2.3 km	MPC · JPL
426023	2011 LK_{14}	—	October 16, 2007	Mount Lemmon	Mount Lemmon Survey	·	2.5 km	MPC · JPL
426024	2011 LC_{23}	—	March 4, 2005	Mount Lemmon	Mount Lemmon Survey	·	2.6 km	MPC · JPL
426025	2011 LL_{23}	—	March 3, 2006	Kitt Peak	Spacewatch	MRX	990 m	MPC · JPL
426026	2011 MH_{2}	—	May 22, 2010	Mount Lemmon	Mount Lemmon Survey	·	5.2 km	MPC · JPL
426027	2011 MJ_{5}	—	March 15, 2010	Catalina	CSS	·	4.0 km	MPC · JPL
426028	2011 OV_{3}	—	January 3, 2009	Mount Lemmon	Mount Lemmon Survey	·	2.5 km	MPC · JPL
426029	2011 PA_{2}	—	February 23, 2010	WISE	WISE	·	6.2 km	MPC · JPL
426030	2011 QM_{1}	—	February 27, 2009	Catalina	CSS	·	3.7 km	MPC · JPL
426031	2011 QL_{12}	—	September 27, 2009	Mount Lemmon	Mount Lemmon Survey	·	670 m	MPC · JPL
426032	2011 QT_{50}	—	October 12, 2007	Mount Lemmon	Mount Lemmon Survey	·	2.4 km	MPC · JPL
426033	2011 QF_{75}	—	March 14, 2004	Kitt Peak	Spacewatch	EOS	1.8 km	MPC · JPL
426034	2011 QO_{75}	—	December 29, 2008	Kitt Peak	Spacewatch	·	2.7 km	MPC · JPL
426035	2011 SS_{28}	—	March 3, 2009	Mount Lemmon	Mount Lemmon Survey	·	3.8 km	MPC · JPL
426036	2011 SN_{47}	—	October 4, 2006	Mount Lemmon	Mount Lemmon Survey	·	3.5 km	MPC · JPL
426037	2011 SO_{103}	—	February 19, 2010	Kitt Peak	Spacewatch	·	3.6 km	MPC · JPL
426038	2011 SP_{120}	—	November 20, 2006	Kitt Peak	Spacewatch	·	3.8 km	MPC · JPL
426039	2011 SX_{174}	—	November 20, 2004	Kitt Peak	Spacewatch	3:2	7.0 km	MPC · JPL
426040	2011 SQ_{189}	—	April 6, 2005	Kitt Peak	Spacewatch	H	410 m	MPC · JPL
426041	2011 UH	—	December 17, 2006	Mount Lemmon	Mount Lemmon Survey	·	3.8 km	MPC · JPL
426042	2011 UN_{21}	—	March 13, 2002	Socorro	LINEAR	H	520 m	MPC · JPL
426043	2011 UD_{104}	—	October 21, 2011	Kitt Peak	Spacewatch	H	450 m	MPC · JPL
426044	2011 UM_{137}	—	May 8, 2010	Mount Lemmon	Mount Lemmon Survey	H	650 m	MPC · JPL
426045	2011 UD_{261}	—	October 18, 2003	Palomar	NEAT	H	670 m	MPC · JPL
426046	2011 UM_{375}	—	October 7, 2005	Catalina	CSS	·	2.4 km	MPC · JPL
426047	2011 WV_{100}	—	December 1, 2005	Kitt Peak	Spacewatch	·	920 m	MPC · JPL
426048	2011 YK	—	May 16, 2010	Catalina	CSS	H	580 m	MPC · JPL
426049	2011 YG_{24}	—	January 12, 2000	Kitt Peak	Spacewatch	L4	9.5 km	MPC · JPL
426050	2012 AA_{14}	—	March 13, 2002	Kitt Peak	Spacewatch	·	630 m	MPC · JPL
426051	2012 AQ_{22}	—	December 25, 2011	Kitt Peak	Spacewatch	H	620 m	MPC · JPL
426052	2012 BB_{10}	—	December 11, 2004	Kitt Peak	Spacewatch	·	530 m	MPC · JPL
426053	2012 BA_{15}	—	January 4, 2012	Mount Lemmon	Mount Lemmon Survey	·	1.5 km	MPC · JPL
426054	2012 BW_{22}	—	March 16, 2004	Catalina	CSS	H	700 m	MPC · JPL
426055	2012 BA_{53}	—	January 13, 2005	Kitt Peak	Spacewatch	·	790 m	MPC · JPL
426056	2012 BM_{53}	—	January 15, 2005	Kitt Peak	Spacewatch	·	480 m	MPC · JPL
426057	2012 BH_{62}	—	August 30, 2005	Anderson Mesa	LONEOS	·	930 m	MPC · JPL
426058	2012 BV_{78}	—	October 16, 2007	Kitt Peak	Spacewatch	·	630 m	MPC · JPL
426059	2012 BS_{81}	—	May 3, 2005	Kitt Peak	Spacewatch	·	1.3 km	MPC · JPL
426060	2012 BT_{88}	—	December 31, 2007	Kitt Peak	Spacewatch	·	1.1 km	MPC · JPL
426061	2012 BY_{90}	—	March 11, 2005	Kitt Peak	Spacewatch	·	890 m	MPC · JPL
426062	2012 BC_{92}	—	February 7, 2002	Kitt Peak	Spacewatch	·	540 m	MPC · JPL
426063	2012 BC_{98}	—	October 10, 2010	Mount Lemmon	Mount Lemmon Survey	·	1.7 km	MPC · JPL
426064	2012 BL_{112}	—	February 27, 2009	Kitt Peak	Spacewatch	·	830 m	MPC · JPL
426065	2012 BM_{125}	—	March 29, 2009	Kitt Peak	Spacewatch	·	540 m	MPC · JPL
426066	2012 BR_{125}	—	January 21, 2012	Kitt Peak	Spacewatch	·	670 m	MPC · JPL
426067	2012 BL_{131}	—	March 28, 2009	Siding Spring	SSS	·	1.0 km	MPC · JPL
426068	2012 CC_{12}	—	January 19, 2005	Kitt Peak	Spacewatch	·	680 m	MPC · JPL
426069	2012 CC_{18}	—	August 31, 2005	Kitt Peak	Spacewatch	H	580 m	MPC · JPL
426070	2012 CJ_{25}	—	October 13, 2007	Kitt Peak	Spacewatch	·	520 m	MPC · JPL
426071	2012 CD_{29}	—	February 13, 2012	La Sagra	OAM	APO	370 m	MPC · JPL
426072	2012 CJ_{32}	—	February 2, 2012	Kitt Peak	Spacewatch	·	910 m	MPC · JPL
426073	2012 CL_{45}	—	January 30, 2012	Kitt Peak	Spacewatch	·	1.2 km	MPC · JPL
426074	2012 CX_{50}	—	March 6, 1999	Kitt Peak	Spacewatch	·	600 m	MPC · JPL
426075	2012 DG_{3}	—	October 1, 2010	Kitt Peak	Spacewatch	·	620 m	MPC · JPL
426076	2012 DF_{8}	—	September 17, 2010	Kitt Peak	Spacewatch	·	620 m	MPC · JPL
426077	2012 DY_{16}	—	January 22, 1998	Kitt Peak	Spacewatch	·	640 m	MPC · JPL
426078	2012 DB_{23}	—	November 12, 2007	Mount Lemmon	Mount Lemmon Survey	·	640 m	MPC · JPL
426079	2012 DR_{23}	—	January 18, 2012	Mount Lemmon	Mount Lemmon Survey	·	530 m	MPC · JPL
426080	2012 DR_{25}	—	February 21, 2012	Kitt Peak	Spacewatch	·	630 m	MPC · JPL
426081	2012 DA_{28}	—	October 10, 2007	Mount Lemmon	Mount Lemmon Survey	·	630 m	MPC · JPL
426082	2012 DG_{31}	—	February 24, 2012	Catalina	CSS	AMO	340 m	MPC · JPL
426083	2012 DE_{39}	—	November 14, 2007	Kitt Peak	Spacewatch	·	630 m	MPC · JPL
426084	2012 DO_{39}	—	May 27, 2009	Mount Lemmon	Mount Lemmon Survey	·	560 m	MPC · JPL
426085	2012 DR_{39}	—	February 23, 2012	Kitt Peak	Spacewatch	·	590 m	MPC · JPL
426086	2012 DM_{43}	—	September 17, 2010	Mount Lemmon	Mount Lemmon Survey	·	640 m	MPC · JPL
426087	2012 DY_{44}	—	February 25, 2012	Kitt Peak	Spacewatch	·	720 m	MPC · JPL
426088	2012 DF_{51}	—	April 4, 2008	Kitt Peak	Spacewatch	·	1.9 km	MPC · JPL
426089	2012 DQ_{52}	—	October 7, 2007	Kitt Peak	Spacewatch	·	780 m	MPC · JPL
426090	2012 DM_{66}	—	September 14, 2010	Kitt Peak	Spacewatch	·	720 m	MPC · JPL
426091	2012 DN_{67}	—	October 14, 2010	Mount Lemmon	Mount Lemmon Survey	·	940 m	MPC · JPL
426092	2012 DD_{80}	—	September 13, 2007	Mount Lemmon	Mount Lemmon Survey	·	940 m	MPC · JPL
426093	2012 DQ_{83}	—	March 4, 2005	Mount Lemmon	Mount Lemmon Survey	·	1 km	MPC · JPL
426094	2012 DB_{88}	—	December 12, 2004	Kitt Peak	Spacewatch	·	750 m	MPC · JPL
426095	2012 DE_{98}	—	April 1, 2005	Kitt Peak	Spacewatch	·	970 m	MPC · JPL
426096	2012 EZ_{3}	—	November 8, 2007	Kitt Peak	Spacewatch	·	730 m	MPC · JPL
426097	2012 EU_{4}	—	March 11, 2005	Mount Lemmon	Mount Lemmon Survey	·	660 m	MPC · JPL
426098	2012 EE_{15}	—	February 9, 2005	Kitt Peak	Spacewatch	·	950 m	MPC · JPL
426099	2012 EL_{17}	—	October 3, 2005	Catalina	CSS	·	1.8 km	MPC · JPL
426100	2012 FM_{11}	—	February 18, 2012	Catalina	CSS	·	1.3 km	MPC · JPL

== 426101–426200 ==
back to top

Designation			Discovery			Properties		Ref
Permanent	Provisional	Named after	Date	Site	Discoverer(s)	Category	Diam.	Ref
426101	2012 FL_{12}	—	June 19, 2006	Mount Lemmon	Mount Lemmon Survey	·	720 m	MPC · JPL
426102	2012 FV_{21}	—	May 28, 2009	Mount Lemmon	Mount Lemmon Survey	·	560 m	MPC · JPL
426103	2012 FC_{23}	—	February 28, 2005	Socorro	LINEAR	PHO	1.4 km	MPC · JPL
426104	2012 FW_{28}	—	November 2, 2007	Kitt Peak	Spacewatch	·	600 m	MPC · JPL
426105	2012 FC_{34}	—	November 14, 2007	Kitt Peak	Spacewatch	·	650 m	MPC · JPL
426106	2012 FD_{34}	—	March 26, 2009	Mount Lemmon	Mount Lemmon Survey	·	730 m	MPC · JPL
426107	2012 FT_{43}	—	October 27, 2005	Kitt Peak	Spacewatch	·	1.8 km	MPC · JPL
426108	2012 FH_{49}	—	March 4, 2005	Mount Lemmon	Mount Lemmon Survey	·	630 m	MPC · JPL
426109	2012 FL_{50}	—	September 3, 2010	Mount Lemmon	Mount Lemmon Survey	·	580 m	MPC · JPL
426110	2012 FU_{54}	—	March 15, 2012	Kitt Peak	Spacewatch	·	1.0 km	MPC · JPL
426111	2012 FK_{55}	—	November 4, 2005	Mount Lemmon	Mount Lemmon Survey	HOF	2.5 km	MPC · JPL
426112	2012 FN_{58}	—	March 21, 2012	Catalina	CSS	NYS	1.0 km	MPC · JPL
426113	2012 FF_{61}	—	February 21, 2012	Mount Lemmon	Mount Lemmon Survey	·	2.0 km	MPC · JPL
426114	2012 FH_{61}	—	March 10, 2005	Mount Lemmon	Mount Lemmon Survey	·	680 m	MPC · JPL
426115	2012 FZ_{61}	—	March 29, 2012	Mount Lemmon	Mount Lemmon Survey	·	770 m	MPC · JPL
426116	2012 FN_{67}	—	March 27, 2012	Kitt Peak	Spacewatch	·	1.5 km	MPC · JPL
426117	2012 FJ_{68}	—	August 28, 2005	Kitt Peak	Spacewatch	·	1.2 km	MPC · JPL
426118	2012 FQ_{68}	—	December 20, 2007	Kitt Peak	Spacewatch	·	650 m	MPC · JPL
426119	2012 FW_{70}	—	March 10, 2005	Mount Lemmon	Mount Lemmon Survey	·	950 m	MPC · JPL
426120	2012 GN_{3}	—	September 30, 2003	Kitt Peak	Spacewatch	·	730 m	MPC · JPL
426121	2012 GN_{7}	—	September 30, 2006	Mount Lemmon	Mount Lemmon Survey	·	750 m	MPC · JPL
426122	2012 GH_{10}	—	September 15, 2009	Kitt Peak	Spacewatch	·	1.9 km	MPC · JPL
426123	2012 GC_{11}	—	September 19, 2006	Kitt Peak	Spacewatch	V	470 m	MPC · JPL
426124	2012 GV_{14}	—	February 23, 1998	Kitt Peak	Spacewatch	·	2.2 km	MPC · JPL
426125	2012 GQ_{19}	—	September 22, 2009	Kitt Peak	Spacewatch	·	1.9 km	MPC · JPL
426126	2012 GJ_{20}	—	March 27, 2012	Catalina	CSS	·	2.5 km	MPC · JPL
426127	2012 GF_{23}	—	October 14, 2007	Mount Lemmon	Mount Lemmon Survey	·	790 m	MPC · JPL
426128	2012 GZ_{23}	—	November 3, 2007	Kitt Peak	Spacewatch	·	640 m	MPC · JPL
426129	2012 GR_{31}	—	March 12, 2002	Kitt Peak	Spacewatch	·	640 m	MPC · JPL
426130	2012 GW_{32}	—	August 15, 2009	Kitt Peak	Spacewatch	MAS	780 m	MPC · JPL
426131	2012 GZ_{39}	—	March 31, 2003	Kitt Peak	Spacewatch	·	1.7 km	MPC · JPL
426132	2012 GN_{40}	—	May 16, 2005	Catalina	CSS	PHO	920 m	MPC · JPL
426133	2012 HP_{17}	—	December 21, 2006	Kitt Peak	Spacewatch	BRG	1.9 km	MPC · JPL
426134	2012 HL_{21}	—	April 20, 2012	Mount Lemmon	Mount Lemmon Survey	AGN	1.2 km	MPC · JPL
426135	2012 HX_{22}	—	April 17, 2012	Kitt Peak	Spacewatch	·	1.5 km	MPC · JPL
426136	2012 HD_{23}	—	April 1, 2012	Mount Lemmon	Mount Lemmon Survey	EUN	1.4 km	MPC · JPL
426137	2012 HU_{25}	—	April 24, 2003	Kitt Peak	Spacewatch	·	2.3 km	MPC · JPL
426138	2012 HJ_{26}	—	January 30, 2008	Kitt Peak	Spacewatch	NYS	800 m	MPC · JPL
426139	2012 HU_{28}	—	December 30, 2007	Kitt Peak	Spacewatch	·	800 m	MPC · JPL
426140	2012 HJ_{29}	—	October 22, 2009	Mount Lemmon	Mount Lemmon Survey	·	2.5 km	MPC · JPL
426141	2012 HG_{30}	—	October 3, 2006	Mount Lemmon	Mount Lemmon Survey	·	1.4 km	MPC · JPL
426142	2012 HH_{30}	—	February 7, 2008	Kitt Peak	Spacewatch	·	1.0 km	MPC · JPL
426143	2012 HC_{32}	—	April 19, 2012	Catalina	CSS	·	4.0 km	MPC · JPL
426144	2012 HK_{33}	—	April 17, 2005	Kitt Peak	Spacewatch	PHO	1.1 km	MPC · JPL
426145	2012 HD_{37}	—	March 4, 2008	Mount Lemmon	Mount Lemmon Survey	·	1.0 km	MPC · JPL
426146	2012 HZ_{38}	—	April 29, 2012	Mount Lemmon	Mount Lemmon Survey	·	1.4 km	MPC · JPL
426147	2012 HA_{39}	—	October 6, 2008	Mount Lemmon	Mount Lemmon Survey	·	3.0 km	MPC · JPL
426148	2012 HT_{39}	—	April 16, 2012	Catalina	CSS	·	1.1 km	MPC · JPL
426149	2012 HQ_{40}	—	April 16, 2012	Kitt Peak	Spacewatch	·	1.0 km	MPC · JPL
426150	2012 HG_{45}	—	March 29, 2012	Kitt Peak	Spacewatch	·	2.1 km	MPC · JPL
426151	2012 HM_{46}	—	November 20, 2009	Kitt Peak	Spacewatch	·	1.8 km	MPC · JPL
426152	2012 HA_{52}	—	January 12, 2008	Mount Lemmon	Mount Lemmon Survey	·	2.0 km	MPC · JPL
426153	2012 HU_{53}	—	May 14, 2005	Mount Lemmon	Mount Lemmon Survey	·	990 m	MPC · JPL
426154	2012 HA_{54}	—	October 31, 2005	Kitt Peak	Spacewatch	·	1.6 km	MPC · JPL
426155	2012 HT_{56}	—	November 27, 2010	Mount Lemmon	Mount Lemmon Survey	·	910 m	MPC · JPL
426156	2012 HC_{58}	—	November 27, 2006	Mount Lemmon	Mount Lemmon Survey	·	1.8 km	MPC · JPL
426157	2012 HO_{59}	—	March 10, 2005	Anderson Mesa	LONEOS	·	820 m	MPC · JPL
426158	2012 HQ_{59}	—	November 16, 2009	Mount Lemmon	Mount Lemmon Survey	(5)	1.2 km	MPC · JPL
426159	2012 HX_{64}	—	June 9, 2005	Kitt Peak	Spacewatch	·	830 m	MPC · JPL
426160	2012 HK_{71}	—	October 23, 2006	Kitt Peak	Spacewatch	·	970 m	MPC · JPL
426161	2012 HZ_{72}	—	April 1, 2005	Kitt Peak	Spacewatch	V	610 m	MPC · JPL
426162	2012 HK_{73}	—	September 24, 2000	Socorro	LINEAR	·	1.4 km	MPC · JPL
426163	2012 HT_{74}	—	November 19, 2006	Kitt Peak	Spacewatch	·	1.2 km	MPC · JPL
426164	2012 HN_{77}	—	October 23, 2001	Kitt Peak	Spacewatch	MAR	1.1 km	MPC · JPL
426165	2012 HR_{77}	—	March 6, 2008	Mount Lemmon	Mount Lemmon Survey	·	730 m	MPC · JPL
426166	2012 HW_{77}	—	October 28, 2006	Kitt Peak	Spacewatch	·	1.0 km	MPC · JPL
426167	2012 JN	—	November 1, 2010	Mount Lemmon	Mount Lemmon Survey	·	1.9 km	MPC · JPL
426168	2012 JT_{1}	—	March 31, 2003	Kitt Peak	Spacewatch	·	1.5 km	MPC · JPL
426169	2012 JK_{2}	—	January 10, 2008	Mount Lemmon	Mount Lemmon Survey	·	1.1 km	MPC · JPL
426170	2012 JY_{2}	—	April 10, 2005	Mount Lemmon	Mount Lemmon Survey	·	720 m	MPC · JPL
426171	2012 JK_{3}	—	March 4, 2005	Kitt Peak	Spacewatch	·	750 m	MPC · JPL
426172	2012 JJ_{4}	—	November 13, 2010	Mount Lemmon	Mount Lemmon Survey	·	930 m	MPC · JPL
426173	2012 JV_{7}	—	January 20, 2008	Kitt Peak	Spacewatch	·	790 m	MPC · JPL
426174	2012 JG_{9}	—	February 12, 2004	Kitt Peak	Spacewatch	·	1.1 km	MPC · JPL
426175	2012 JQ_{10}	—	March 12, 2008	Mount Lemmon	Mount Lemmon Survey	·	1.0 km	MPC · JPL
426176	2012 JZ_{12}	—	February 23, 2011	Catalina	CSS	·	2.4 km	MPC · JPL
426177	2012 JB_{13}	—	October 21, 2009	Mount Lemmon	Mount Lemmon Survey	·	2.6 km	MPC · JPL
426178	2012 JT_{15}	—	January 28, 2011	Mount Lemmon	Mount Lemmon Survey	·	2.3 km	MPC · JPL
426179	2012 JK_{18}	—	May 8, 2008	Mount Lemmon	Mount Lemmon Survey	(5)	1.1 km	MPC · JPL
426180	2012 JX_{18}	—	February 27, 2008	Mount Lemmon	Mount Lemmon Survey	MAS	710 m	MPC · JPL
426181	2012 JE_{21}	—	January 27, 2007	Kitt Peak	Spacewatch	·	2.0 km	MPC · JPL
426182	2012 JQ_{23}	—	February 18, 2007	Anderson Mesa	LONEOS	MAR	1.5 km	MPC · JPL
426183	2012 JO_{25}	—	January 30, 2011	Mount Lemmon	Mount Lemmon Survey	MRX	1.1 km	MPC · JPL
426184	2012 JP_{27}	—	February 2, 2008	Kitt Peak	Spacewatch	NYS	820 m	MPC · JPL
426185	2012 JF_{34}	—	October 28, 2005	Kitt Peak	Spacewatch	·	1.2 km	MPC · JPL
426186	2012 JS_{38}	—	October 2, 1995	Kitt Peak	Spacewatch	·	2.2 km	MPC · JPL
426187	2012 JV_{41}	—	April 29, 2012	Mount Lemmon	Mount Lemmon Survey	GEF	1.1 km	MPC · JPL
426188	2012 JJ_{42}	—	October 11, 2004	Kitt Peak	Spacewatch	AEO	960 m	MPC · JPL
426189	2012 JP_{42}	—	November 23, 2006	Kitt Peak	Spacewatch	V	600 m	MPC · JPL
426190	2012 JB_{46}	—	November 21, 2006	Mount Lemmon	Mount Lemmon Survey	RAF	1.1 km	MPC · JPL
426191	2012 JQ_{48}	—	March 29, 2012	Kitt Peak	Spacewatch	·	860 m	MPC · JPL
426192	2012 JR_{50}	—	March 28, 2012	Kitt Peak	Spacewatch	·	1.2 km	MPC · JPL
426193	2012 JE_{58}	—	November 17, 2009	Mount Lemmon	Mount Lemmon Survey	·	1.7 km	MPC · JPL
426194	2012 JP_{63}	—	May 1, 2012	Mount Lemmon	Mount Lemmon Survey	·	620 m	MPC · JPL
426195	2012 JY_{66}	—	November 11, 2009	Kitt Peak	Spacewatch	MAR	1.0 km	MPC · JPL
426196	2012 KQ	—	March 29, 2012	Mount Lemmon	Mount Lemmon Survey	NYS	1 km	MPC · JPL
426197	2012 KV_{1}	—	March 29, 2012	Kitt Peak	Spacewatch	·	1.5 km	MPC · JPL
426198	2012 KK_{2}	—	February 10, 2007	Mount Lemmon	Mount Lemmon Survey	·	3.0 km	MPC · JPL
426199	2012 KS_{2}	—	October 31, 2005	Mount Lemmon	Mount Lemmon Survey	(1547)	1.6 km	MPC · JPL
426200	2012 KU_{2}	—	January 10, 2007	Mount Lemmon	Mount Lemmon Survey	·	1.3 km	MPC · JPL

== 426201–426300 ==
back to top

Designation			Discovery			Properties		Ref
Permanent	Provisional	Named after	Date	Site	Discoverer(s)	Category	Diam.	Ref
426201	2012 KN_{10}	—	September 27, 2009	Mount Lemmon	Mount Lemmon Survey	·	2.1 km	MPC · JPL
426202	2012 KB_{12}	—	November 3, 2010	Mount Lemmon	Mount Lemmon Survey	·	2.5 km	MPC · JPL
426203	2012 KD_{20}	—	May 19, 2005	Mount Lemmon	Mount Lemmon Survey	·	940 m	MPC · JPL
426204	2012 KM_{23}	—	March 10, 2011	Mount Lemmon	Mount Lemmon Survey	T_{j} (2.97)	3.8 km	MPC · JPL
426205	2012 KA_{25}	—	April 19, 2012	Mount Lemmon	Mount Lemmon Survey	(5)	1.3 km	MPC · JPL
426206	2012 KE_{33}	—	May 14, 2005	Mount Lemmon	Mount Lemmon Survey	·	700 m	MPC · JPL
426207	2012 KV_{33}	—	March 12, 2005	Socorro	LINEAR	·	740 m	MPC · JPL
426208	2012 KP_{35}	—	May 20, 2005	Mount Lemmon	Mount Lemmon Survey	·	780 m	MPC · JPL
426209	2012 KG_{39}	—	September 29, 2005	Kitt Peak	Spacewatch	·	1.1 km	MPC · JPL
426210	2012 KM_{40}	—	February 1, 2005	Kitt Peak	Spacewatch	·	690 m	MPC · JPL
426211	2012 KV_{45}	—	January 31, 2006	Mount Lemmon	Mount Lemmon Survey	·	2.3 km	MPC · JPL
426212	2012 KF_{46}	—	February 25, 2012	Mount Lemmon	Mount Lemmon Survey	·	2.1 km	MPC · JPL
426213	2012 KL_{46}	—	October 26, 2009	Mount Lemmon	Mount Lemmon Survey	·	5.5 km	MPC · JPL
426214	2012 KO_{46}	—	February 25, 2006	Mount Lemmon	Mount Lemmon Survey	·	3.2 km	MPC · JPL
426215	2012 KY_{46}	—	March 2, 2008	XuYi	PMO NEO Survey Program	·	1.4 km	MPC · JPL
426216	2012 KJ_{49}	—	May 21, 2012	Mount Lemmon	Mount Lemmon Survey	·	2.0 km	MPC · JPL
426217	2012 KM_{49}	—	May 21, 2012	Mount Lemmon	Mount Lemmon Survey	NEM	2.3 km	MPC · JPL
426218	2012 KL_{50}	—	May 31, 2008	Mount Lemmon	Mount Lemmon Survey	·	1.8 km	MPC · JPL
426219	2012 LL_{6}	—	March 25, 2007	Mount Lemmon	Mount Lemmon Survey	GEF	1.3 km	MPC · JPL
426220	2012 LT_{8}	—	January 13, 2005	Kitt Peak	Spacewatch	EOS	2.0 km	MPC · JPL
426221	2012 LQ_{12}	—	November 25, 2005	Kitt Peak	Spacewatch	·	1.8 km	MPC · JPL
426222	2012 LS_{15}	—	May 8, 2008	Mount Lemmon	Mount Lemmon Survey	·	1.1 km	MPC · JPL
426223	2012 LA_{18}	—	October 14, 2009	Mount Lemmon	Mount Lemmon Survey	WIT	1.0 km	MPC · JPL
426224	2012 LH_{24}	—	May 1, 2003	Kitt Peak	Spacewatch	·	1.9 km	MPC · JPL
426225	2012 LM_{24}	—	March 13, 2007	Kitt Peak	Spacewatch	·	1.9 km	MPC · JPL
426226	2012 LA_{25}	—	June 20, 2007	Kitt Peak	Spacewatch	·	4.6 km	MPC · JPL
426227	2012 MT_{1}	—	March 28, 2008	Kitt Peak	Spacewatch	·	1.1 km	MPC · JPL
426228	2012 MC_{5}	—	October 16, 2009	Mount Lemmon	Mount Lemmon Survey	EUN	1.2 km	MPC · JPL
426229	2012 MW_{8}	—	March 14, 2007	Catalina	CSS	EUN	1.6 km	MPC · JPL
426230	2012 MA_{9}	—	January 6, 2010	Kitt Peak	Spacewatch	·	3.5 km	MPC · JPL
426231	2012 OS_{1}	—	September 12, 2001	Socorro	LINEAR	LIX	3.2 km	MPC · JPL
426232	2012 OL_{2}	—	October 5, 2002	Palomar	NEAT	·	4.7 km	MPC · JPL
426233	2012 OT_{2}	—	May 17, 2012	Mount Lemmon	Mount Lemmon Survey	·	3.2 km	MPC · JPL
426234	2012 OZ_{2}	—	May 25, 2003	Kitt Peak	Spacewatch	·	1.8 km	MPC · JPL
426235	2012 OD_{3}	—	May 13, 2004	Kitt Peak	Spacewatch	NYS	1.1 km	MPC · JPL
426236	2012 PX_{3}	—	November 20, 2007	Mount Lemmon	Mount Lemmon Survey	·	3.0 km	MPC · JPL
426237	2012 PX_{4}	—	October 14, 2007	Catalina	CSS	·	3.7 km	MPC · JPL
426238	2012 PR_{9}	—	October 11, 2007	Mount Lemmon	Mount Lemmon Survey	VER	2.3 km	MPC · JPL
426239	2012 PD_{10}	—	June 27, 2010	WISE	WISE	·	4.5 km	MPC · JPL
426240	2012 PL_{14}	—	April 30, 2011	Kitt Peak	Spacewatch	·	2.3 km	MPC · JPL
426241	2012 PE_{16}	—	March 25, 2006	Kitt Peak	Spacewatch	·	2.6 km	MPC · JPL
426242	2012 PN_{16}	—	February 26, 2007	Mount Lemmon	Mount Lemmon Survey	·	1.5 km	MPC · JPL
426243	2012 PE_{17}	—	April 3, 2010	Kitt Peak	Spacewatch	·	3.7 km	MPC · JPL
426244	2012 PB_{18}	—	June 5, 2010	WISE	WISE	·	6.0 km	MPC · JPL
426245	2012 PG_{20}	—	March 11, 2005	Kitt Peak	Spacewatch	EOS	2.0 km	MPC · JPL
426246	2012 PA_{22}	—	May 28, 2012	Mount Lemmon	Mount Lemmon Survey	·	2.9 km	MPC · JPL
426247	2012 PS_{27}	—	May 11, 2007	Catalina	CSS	·	3.0 km	MPC · JPL
426248	2012 PJ_{30}	—	November 14, 2001	Kitt Peak	Spacewatch	·	1.6 km	MPC · JPL
426249	2012 PS_{33}	—	May 11, 2010	WISE	WISE	·	4.1 km	MPC · JPL
426250	2012 PT_{36}	—	July 22, 1995	Kitt Peak	Spacewatch	·	3.4 km	MPC · JPL
426251	2012 PT_{37}	—	September 20, 2001	Socorro	LINEAR	·	3.4 km	MPC · JPL
426252	2012 PQ_{38}	—	February 23, 1998	Kitt Peak	Spacewatch	·	1.3 km	MPC · JPL
426253	2012 PE_{44}	—	September 19, 2001	Socorro	LINEAR	·	3.5 km	MPC · JPL
426254	2012 QP	—	April 18, 2010	WISE	WISE	·	2.9 km	MPC · JPL
426255	2012 QU_{2}	—	April 20, 2004	Kitt Peak	Spacewatch	·	1.9 km	MPC · JPL
426256	2012 QT_{20}	—	March 19, 2010	Mount Lemmon	Mount Lemmon Survey	·	4.2 km	MPC · JPL
426257	2012 QB_{23}	—	February 22, 1998	Kitt Peak	Spacewatch	·	3.6 km	MPC · JPL
426258	2012 QB_{25}	—	March 18, 2004	Socorro	LINEAR	·	4.1 km	MPC · JPL
426259	2012 QG_{25}	—	February 14, 2010	Mount Lemmon	Mount Lemmon Survey	·	2.0 km	MPC · JPL
426260	2012 QG_{28}	—	August 24, 2012	Kitt Peak	Spacewatch	·	3.0 km	MPC · JPL
426261	2012 QS_{29}	—	September 28, 2008	Mount Lemmon	Mount Lemmon Survey	·	1.6 km	MPC · JPL
426262	2012 QO_{38}	—	April 5, 2005	Mount Lemmon	Mount Lemmon Survey	·	2.7 km	MPC · JPL
426263	2012 QW_{38}	—	November 1, 2008	Mount Lemmon	Mount Lemmon Survey	EOS	2.5 km	MPC · JPL
426264	2012 QA_{39}	—	September 19, 2003	Socorro	LINEAR	·	2.3 km	MPC · JPL
426265	2012 QZ_{41}	—	October 8, 2007	Catalina	CSS	·	3.0 km	MPC · JPL
426266	2012 QB_{43}	—	May 25, 2010	WISE	WISE	·	4.6 km	MPC · JPL
426267	2012 QQ_{51}	—	March 27, 2011	Mount Lemmon	Mount Lemmon Survey	·	1.6 km	MPC · JPL
426268	2012 RR_{5}	—	October 11, 2007	Kitt Peak	Spacewatch	·	2.3 km	MPC · JPL
426269	2012 RF_{27}	—	March 10, 2005	Mount Lemmon	Mount Lemmon Survey	·	2.8 km	MPC · JPL
426270	2012 RK_{32}	—	September 6, 2008	Catalina	CSS	·	1.3 km	MPC · JPL
426271	2012 RY_{37}	—	February 13, 2010	Kitt Peak	Spacewatch	·	3.6 km	MPC · JPL
426272	2012 RS_{40}	—	November 12, 2005	Kitt Peak	Spacewatch	·	2.8 km	MPC · JPL
426273	2012 SL_{4}	—	April 1, 2005	Kitt Peak	Spacewatch	·	2.6 km	MPC · JPL
426274	2012 SD_{8}	—	February 17, 2010	Kitt Peak	Spacewatch	·	3.9 km	MPC · JPL
426275	2012 SX_{17}	—	October 21, 2007	Kitt Peak	Spacewatch	EOS	2.1 km	MPC · JPL
426276	2012 SL_{23}	—	October 9, 2007	Kitt Peak	Spacewatch	·	1.8 km	MPC · JPL
426277	2012 SD_{31}	—	September 14, 2007	Kitt Peak	Spacewatch	·	2.2 km	MPC · JPL
426278	2012 SB_{34}	—	March 19, 2010	Kitt Peak	Spacewatch	·	2.7 km	MPC · JPL
426279	2012 SX_{52}	—	May 16, 2005	Mount Lemmon	Mount Lemmon Survey	VER	2.7 km	MPC · JPL
426280	2012 SL_{55}	—	March 16, 2004	Kitt Peak	Spacewatch	VER	2.5 km	MPC · JPL
426281	2012 SP_{61}	—	September 17, 2003	Kitt Peak	Spacewatch	·	2.3 km	MPC · JPL
426282	2012 TU_{23}	—	October 8, 2007	Catalina	CSS	·	2.5 km	MPC · JPL
426283	2012 TK_{25}	—	June 17, 2007	Kitt Peak	Spacewatch	ADE	2.2 km	MPC · JPL
426284	2012 TJ_{26}	—	February 15, 2010	Kitt Peak	Spacewatch	·	5.3 km	MPC · JPL
426285	2012 TW_{31}	—	September 22, 1995	Kitt Peak	Spacewatch	·	3.2 km	MPC · JPL
426286	2012 TL_{36}	—	September 13, 2007	Mount Lemmon	Mount Lemmon Survey	·	2.5 km	MPC · JPL
426287	2012 TF_{41}	—	July 21, 2006	Mount Lemmon	Mount Lemmon Survey	·	4.2 km	MPC · JPL
426288	2012 TA_{51}	—	September 19, 2001	Socorro	LINEAR	·	2.4 km	MPC · JPL
426289	2012 TE_{52}	—	September 24, 2012	Kitt Peak	Spacewatch	L5	7.3 km	MPC · JPL
426290	2012 TC_{58}	—	September 15, 2006	Kitt Peak	Spacewatch	·	3.5 km	MPC · JPL
426291	2012 TF_{70}	—	September 19, 2001	Socorro	LINEAR	THM	2.5 km	MPC · JPL
426292	2012 TA_{74}	—	April 14, 2008	Mount Lemmon	Mount Lemmon Survey	L5	9.5 km	MPC · JPL
426293	2012 TH_{82}	—	March 11, 2005	Mount Lemmon	Mount Lemmon Survey	·	3.3 km	MPC · JPL
426294	2012 TA_{84}	—	April 11, 2005	Kitt Peak	Spacewatch	TIR	2.7 km	MPC · JPL
426295	2012 TV_{90}	—	September 26, 1995	Kitt Peak	Spacewatch	·	2.9 km	MPC · JPL
426296	2012 TB_{94}	—	May 6, 2006	Mount Lemmon	Mount Lemmon Survey	·	2.4 km	MPC · JPL
426297	2012 TD_{108}	—	March 17, 2009	Kitt Peak	Spacewatch	CYB	3.9 km	MPC · JPL
426298	2012 TH_{119}	—	October 24, 2008	Kitt Peak	Spacewatch	·	2.2 km	MPC · JPL
426299	2012 TF_{128}	—	October 20, 2007	Mount Lemmon	Mount Lemmon Survey	·	3.8 km	MPC · JPL
426300	2012 TE_{131}	—	July 26, 2008	Siding Spring	SSS	·	1.5 km	MPC · JPL

== 426301–426400 ==
back to top

Designation			Discovery			Properties		Ref
Permanent	Provisional	Named after	Date	Site	Discoverer(s)	Category	Diam.	Ref
426301	2012 TM_{136}	—	September 30, 2000	Kitt Peak	Spacewatch	·	1.1 km	MPC · JPL
426302	2012 TG_{139}	—	January 16, 2009	Kitt Peak	Spacewatch	EOS	2.2 km	MPC · JPL
426303	2012 TG_{145}	—	September 13, 2007	Kitt Peak	Spacewatch	EOS	2.0 km	MPC · JPL
426304	2012 TP_{162}	—	March 21, 2010	Mount Lemmon	Mount Lemmon Survey	EOS	2.1 km	MPC · JPL
426305	2012 TO_{163}	—	November 18, 2007	Kitt Peak	Spacewatch	HYG	2.8 km	MPC · JPL
426306	2012 TB_{164}	—	September 28, 2006	Kitt Peak	Spacewatch	·	3.4 km	MPC · JPL
426307	2012 TP_{165}	—	April 10, 2005	Mount Lemmon	Mount Lemmon Survey	·	2.6 km	MPC · JPL
426308	2012 TE_{166}	—	October 12, 2007	Mount Lemmon	Mount Lemmon Survey	·	2.9 km	MPC · JPL
426309	2012 TA_{176}	—	April 14, 2004	Kitt Peak	Spacewatch	·	2.6 km	MPC · JPL
426310	2012 TX_{186}	—	December 20, 2007	Mount Lemmon	Mount Lemmon Survey	·	3.3 km	MPC · JPL
426311	2012 TT_{201}	—	September 16, 2012	Kitt Peak	Spacewatch	L5	8.3 km	MPC · JPL
426312	2012 TA_{215}	—	April 21, 2004	Kitt Peak	Spacewatch	·	1.0 km	MPC · JPL
426313	2012 TD_{224}	—	April 9, 2010	Mount Lemmon	Mount Lemmon Survey	·	3.6 km	MPC · JPL
426314	2012 TD_{243}	—	May 6, 2006	Mount Lemmon	Mount Lemmon Survey	AGN	1.3 km	MPC · JPL
426315	2012 TJ_{259}	—	March 8, 2005	Mount Lemmon	Mount Lemmon Survey	KOR	1.4 km	MPC · JPL
426316	2012 TY_{264}	—	February 14, 2009	Mount Lemmon	Mount Lemmon Survey	THM	3.0 km	MPC · JPL
426317	2012 TJ_{271}	—	April 12, 2005	Kitt Peak	Spacewatch	·	3.4 km	MPC · JPL
426318	2012 TC_{310}	—	December 21, 2008	Mount Lemmon	Mount Lemmon Survey	·	2.0 km	MPC · JPL
426319	2012 TM_{315}	—	December 14, 2001	Socorro	LINEAR	·	2.6 km	MPC · JPL
426320	2012 UM_{2}	—	March 11, 2005	Kitt Peak	Spacewatch	KOR	1.9 km	MPC · JPL
426321	2012 UF_{16}	—	November 8, 2008	Kitt Peak	Spacewatch	·	1.6 km	MPC · JPL
426322	2012 UY_{34}	—	April 14, 2004	Kitt Peak	Spacewatch	·	4.3 km	MPC · JPL
426323	2012 UG_{94}	—	November 2, 2007	Mount Lemmon	Mount Lemmon Survey	·	3.1 km	MPC · JPL
426324	2012 UR_{94}	—	May 11, 2007	Kitt Peak	Spacewatch	KON	3.8 km	MPC · JPL
426325	2012 UE_{128}	—	September 15, 2006	Kitt Peak	Spacewatch	·	2.1 km	MPC · JPL
426326	2012 US_{137}	—	March 14, 2007	Kitt Peak	Spacewatch	L5	8.3 km	MPC · JPL
426327	2012 UD_{139}	—	September 19, 2006	Anderson Mesa	LONEOS	·	3.3 km	MPC · JPL
426328	2012 UP_{139}	—	August 27, 2006	Kitt Peak	Spacewatch	·	4.9 km	MPC · JPL
426329	2012 UJ_{156}	—	October 8, 1999	Kitt Peak	Spacewatch	·	1.7 km	MPC · JPL
426330	2012 UG_{167}	—	April 30, 2006	Kitt Peak	Spacewatch	·	2.5 km	MPC · JPL
426331	2012 UA_{172}	—	February 25, 2006	Kitt Peak	Spacewatch	·	2.1 km	MPC · JPL
426332	2012 UK_{176}	—	September 19, 2006	Kitt Peak	Spacewatch	·	2.4 km	MPC · JPL
426333	2012 VG_{39}	—	February 13, 2010	WISE	WISE	·	3.9 km	MPC · JPL
426334	2012 VK_{45}	—	October 2, 2006	Catalina	CSS	·	3.3 km	MPC · JPL
426335	2012 VP_{57}	—	October 18, 2006	Kitt Peak	Spacewatch	·	3.1 km	MPC · JPL
426336	2012 VE_{78}	—	November 7, 2007	Catalina	CSS	·	3.1 km	MPC · JPL
426337	2012 VV_{100}	—	July 22, 2006	Mount Lemmon	Mount Lemmon Survey	·	4.1 km	MPC · JPL
426338	2012 WL_{1}	—	March 31, 2004	Kitt Peak	Spacewatch	·	3.4 km	MPC · JPL
426339	2012 WL_{12}	—	December 16, 2007	Mount Lemmon	Mount Lemmon Survey	·	3.1 km	MPC · JPL
426340	2013 EB_{19}	—	September 14, 2006	Catalina	CSS	H	560 m	MPC · JPL
426341	2013 FD_{16}	—	April 27, 2000	Kitt Peak	Spacewatch	·	670 m	MPC · JPL
426342	2013 GG_{12}	—	April 7, 2010	WISE	WISE	PHO	1.2 km	MPC · JPL
426343	2013 GT_{91}	—	July 4, 2010	Kitt Peak	Spacewatch	·	840 m	MPC · JPL
426344	2013 GZ_{94}	—	April 3, 2013	Mount Lemmon	Mount Lemmon Survey	·	850 m	MPC · JPL
426345	2013 HA_{15}	—	April 11, 2013	Catalina	CSS	H	710 m	MPC · JPL
426346	2013 KM_{2}	—	July 5, 1995	Kitt Peak	Spacewatch	PHO	1.2 km	MPC · JPL
426347	2013 KO_{2}	—	September 17, 2009	Catalina	CSS	EUN	1.3 km	MPC · JPL
426348	2013 KA_{4}	—	August 26, 2009	Catalina	CSS	·	2.3 km	MPC · JPL
426349	2013 KG_{15}	—	January 2, 2012	Mount Lemmon	Mount Lemmon Survey	·	810 m	MPC · JPL
426350	2013 LR_{5}	—	November 21, 2006	Mount Lemmon	Mount Lemmon Survey	H	470 m	MPC · JPL
426351	2013 LX_{19}	—	September 12, 2007	Catalina	CSS	·	570 m	MPC · JPL
426352	2013 LX_{23}	—	October 8, 2007	Anderson Mesa	LONEOS	·	900 m	MPC · JPL
426353	2013 LW_{31}	—	September 16, 2009	Catalina	CSS	·	1.6 km	MPC · JPL
426354	2013 LY_{32}	—	May 20, 2010	Mount Lemmon	Mount Lemmon Survey	H	640 m	MPC · JPL
426355	2013 MA_{4}	—	September 23, 2008	Catalina	CSS	·	1.8 km	MPC · JPL
426356	2013 MD_{5}	—	April 18, 2010	WISE	WISE	·	3.4 km	MPC · JPL
426357	2013 NW_{3}	—	November 25, 2005	Mount Lemmon	Mount Lemmon Survey	·	1.6 km	MPC · JPL
426358	2013 NW_{6}	—	November 16, 2009	Mount Lemmon	Mount Lemmon Survey	·	4.3 km	MPC · JPL
426359	2013 NS_{7}	—	May 31, 2006	Mount Lemmon	Mount Lemmon Survey	V	690 m	MPC · JPL
426360	2013 NS_{9}	—	November 26, 2003	Kitt Peak	Spacewatch	V	600 m	MPC · JPL
426361	2013 NA_{11}	—	July 11, 2004	Socorro	LINEAR	·	2.1 km	MPC · JPL
426362	2013 ND_{11}	—	October 19, 2003	Kitt Peak	Spacewatch	·	780 m	MPC · JPL
426363	2013 NM_{14}	—	August 28, 2006	Catalina	CSS	·	890 m	MPC · JPL
426364	2013 NK_{16}	—	September 19, 2003	Campo Imperatore	CINEOS	·	690 m	MPC · JPL
426365	2013 NV_{19}	—	November 21, 2006	Mount Lemmon	Mount Lemmon Survey	·	1.5 km	MPC · JPL
426366	2013 NQ_{21}	—	July 7, 2013	Siding Spring	SSS	·	2.9 km	MPC · JPL
426367	2013 NX_{22}	—	March 6, 2008	Mount Lemmon	Mount Lemmon Survey	·	1.2 km	MPC · JPL
426368	2013 ND_{23}	—	December 22, 2003	Kitt Peak	Spacewatch	·	1.4 km	MPC · JPL
426369	2013 OP_{4}	—	October 26, 2005	Kitt Peak	Spacewatch	·	1.6 km	MPC · JPL
426370	2013 OE_{5}	—	September 10, 2010	Mount Lemmon	Mount Lemmon Survey	·	670 m	MPC · JPL
426371	2013 ON_{8}	—	November 8, 2010	Mount Lemmon	Mount Lemmon Survey	·	650 m	MPC · JPL
426372	2013 OP_{8}	—	January 6, 2010	Mount Lemmon	Mount Lemmon Survey	·	5.2 km	MPC · JPL
426373	2013 OT_{9}	—	July 13, 1999	Socorro	LINEAR	·	1.1 km	MPC · JPL
426374	2013 PJ	—	February 23, 2012	Catalina	CSS	·	2.5 km	MPC · JPL
426375	2013 PH_{1}	—	October 27, 2006	Mount Lemmon	Mount Lemmon Survey	·	1.3 km	MPC · JPL
426376	2013 PS_{2}	—	June 15, 2013	Mount Lemmon	Mount Lemmon Survey	H	490 m	MPC · JPL
426377	2013 PU_{7}	—	September 23, 2009	Catalina	CSS	(194)	1.5 km	MPC · JPL
426378	2013 PJ_{9}	—	January 31, 2009	Mount Lemmon	Mount Lemmon Survey	·	590 m	MPC · JPL
426379	2013 PW_{15}	—	August 9, 2004	Socorro	LINEAR	·	1.7 km	MPC · JPL
426380	2013 PF_{16}	—	March 17, 2010	WISE	WISE	·	3.9 km	MPC · JPL
426381	2013 PG_{16}	—	October 14, 2010	Mount Lemmon	Mount Lemmon Survey	·	820 m	MPC · JPL
426382	2013 PM_{17}	—	September 17, 1998	Kitt Peak	Spacewatch	MAS	800 m	MPC · JPL
426383	2013 PC_{19}	—	July 28, 2009	Kitt Peak	Spacewatch	·	1.4 km	MPC · JPL
426384	2013 PH_{19}	—	August 2, 2000	Socorro	LINEAR	·	2.5 km	MPC · JPL
426385	2013 PF_{20}	—	August 9, 2013	Kitt Peak	Spacewatch	·	730 m	MPC · JPL
426386	2013 PC_{21}	—	October 6, 2004	Socorro	LINEAR	·	2.0 km	MPC · JPL
426387	2013 PR_{21}	—	September 17, 2003	Kitt Peak	Spacewatch	·	580 m	MPC · JPL
426388	2013 PG_{24}	—	March 20, 2007	Mount Lemmon	Mount Lemmon Survey	HOF	2.3 km	MPC · JPL
426389	2013 PK_{24}	—	March 10, 2008	Kitt Peak	Spacewatch	·	1.0 km	MPC · JPL
426390	2013 PV_{25}	—	December 3, 2010	Mount Lemmon	Mount Lemmon Survey	·	1.7 km	MPC · JPL
426391	2013 PL_{26}	—	November 18, 2009	Kitt Peak	Spacewatch	·	1.9 km	MPC · JPL
426392	2013 PW_{26}	—	December 6, 2010	Mount Lemmon	Mount Lemmon Survey	V	800 m	MPC · JPL
426393	2013 PA_{31}	—	August 26, 2000	Socorro	LINEAR	·	1.6 km	MPC · JPL
426394	2013 PJ_{32}	—	May 19, 2012	Mount Lemmon	Mount Lemmon Survey	·	1.7 km	MPC · JPL
426395	2013 PN_{32}	—	August 21, 2006	Kitt Peak	Spacewatch	V	590 m	MPC · JPL
426396	2013 PW_{32}	—	March 1, 2011	Mount Lemmon	Mount Lemmon Survey	·	3.1 km	MPC · JPL
426397	2013 PR_{34}	—	February 14, 2005	Kitt Peak	Spacewatch	V	520 m	MPC · JPL
426398	2013 PH_{40}	—	November 9, 2009	Kitt Peak	Spacewatch	·	1.5 km	MPC · JPL
426399	2013 PL_{41}	—	September 7, 2008	Mount Lemmon	Mount Lemmon Survey	·	1.4 km	MPC · JPL
426400	2013 PE_{49}	—	August 7, 2004	Campo Imperatore	CINEOS	·	1.6 km	MPC · JPL

== 426401–426500 ==
back to top

Designation			Discovery			Properties		Ref
Permanent	Provisional	Named after	Date	Site	Discoverer(s)	Category	Diam.	Ref
426401	2013 PX_{49}	—	September 18, 2010	Mount Lemmon	Mount Lemmon Survey	·	790 m	MPC · JPL
426402	2013 PC_{51}	—	April 8, 2008	Kitt Peak	Spacewatch	JUN	1.0 km	MPC · JPL
426403	2013 PR_{54}	—	May 3, 2009	Kitt Peak	Spacewatch	·	610 m	MPC · JPL
426404	2013 PF_{62}	—	September 22, 2009	Catalina	CSS	·	2.4 km	MPC · JPL
426405	2013 PA_{64}	—	August 29, 2006	Kitt Peak	Spacewatch	·	750 m	MPC · JPL
426406	2013 PB_{66}	—	November 8, 2009	Mount Lemmon	Mount Lemmon Survey	·	1.9 km	MPC · JPL
426407	2013 PL_{69}	—	March 3, 2008	Mount Lemmon	Mount Lemmon Survey	·	1.5 km	MPC · JPL
426408	2013 PO_{69}	—	December 14, 2010	Mount Lemmon	Mount Lemmon Survey	·	2.6 km	MPC · JPL
426409	2013 PH_{71}	—	June 24, 2009	Kitt Peak	Spacewatch	·	1.5 km	MPC · JPL
426410	2013 PS_{71}	—	October 11, 2005	Anderson Mesa	LONEOS	·	2.0 km	MPC · JPL
426411	2013 PC_{72}	—	May 15, 2005	Mount Lemmon	Mount Lemmon Survey	·	1.4 km	MPC · JPL
426412	2013 PP_{72}	—	November 27, 2009	Mount Lemmon	Mount Lemmon Survey	·	1.7 km	MPC · JPL
426413	2013 QL_{2}	—	September 16, 2010	Kitt Peak	Spacewatch	·	650 m	MPC · JPL
426414	2013 QS_{3}	—	August 28, 2006	Kitt Peak	Spacewatch	·	720 m	MPC · JPL
426415	2013 QX_{3}	—	December 6, 2010	Mount Lemmon	Mount Lemmon Survey	·	1.3 km	MPC · JPL
426416	2013 QY_{3}	—	July 28, 2009	Kitt Peak	Spacewatch	·	810 m	MPC · JPL
426417	2013 QB_{9}	—	September 16, 1998	Kitt Peak	Spacewatch	KOR	1.5 km	MPC · JPL
426418	2013 QG_{9}	—	November 2, 2006	Mount Lemmon	Mount Lemmon Survey	V	630 m	MPC · JPL
426419	2013 QY_{13}	—	April 10, 2003	Kitt Peak	Spacewatch	·	1.7 km	MPC · JPL
426420	2013 QO_{14}	—	February 21, 2007	Mount Lemmon	Mount Lemmon Survey	·	1.1 km	MPC · JPL
426421	2013 QP_{14}	—	April 2, 2005	Mount Lemmon	Mount Lemmon Survey	·	670 m	MPC · JPL
426422	2013 QW_{14}	—	November 25, 2009	Kitt Peak	Spacewatch	·	3.6 km	MPC · JPL
426423	2013 QU_{15}	—	June 1, 2009	Mount Lemmon	Mount Lemmon Survey	·	1.4 km	MPC · JPL
426424	2013 QG_{16}	—	September 19, 2003	Kitt Peak	Spacewatch	·	730 m	MPC · JPL
426425	2013 QR_{16}	—	June 7, 2008	Siding Spring	SSS	·	2.6 km	MPC · JPL
426426	2013 QC_{19}	—	February 16, 2007	Bergisch Gladbach	W. Bickel	WIT	970 m	MPC · JPL
426427	2013 QV_{23}	—	October 26, 2009	Mount Lemmon	Mount Lemmon Survey	KOR	1.4 km	MPC · JPL
426428	2013 QV_{26}	—	March 15, 2012	Kitt Peak	Spacewatch	PHO	1.0 km	MPC · JPL
426429	2013 QT_{29}	—	January 30, 2006	Kitt Peak	Spacewatch	·	1.5 km	MPC · JPL
426430	2013 QA_{30}	—	November 7, 2010	Mount Lemmon	Mount Lemmon Survey	NYS	1.5 km	MPC · JPL
426431	2013 QD_{32}	—	January 31, 2006	Kitt Peak	Spacewatch	·	1.9 km	MPC · JPL
426432	2013 QP_{32}	—	September 18, 2009	Catalina	CSS	·	1.8 km	MPC · JPL
426433	2013 QS_{34}	—	November 13, 2010	Mount Lemmon	Mount Lemmon Survey	·	1.9 km	MPC · JPL
426434	2013 QH_{35}	—	March 14, 2011	Mount Lemmon	Mount Lemmon Survey	·	2.3 km	MPC · JPL
426435	2013 QV_{35}	—	November 11, 2009	Kitt Peak	Spacewatch	·	1.7 km	MPC · JPL
426436	2013 QN_{36}	—	September 10, 2004	Kitt Peak	Spacewatch	·	1.8 km	MPC · JPL
426437	2013 QK_{39}	—	August 25, 2004	Kitt Peak	Spacewatch	·	1.6 km	MPC · JPL
426438	2013 QM_{39}	—	November 19, 2006	Kitt Peak	Spacewatch	·	1.1 km	MPC · JPL
426439	2013 QV_{39}	—	September 29, 2005	Catalina	CSS	·	2.1 km	MPC · JPL
426440	2013 QF_{40}	—	September 3, 2008	Kitt Peak	Spacewatch	·	1.5 km	MPC · JPL
426441	2013 QN_{43}	—	February 26, 2008	Kitt Peak	Spacewatch	·	820 m	MPC · JPL
426442	2013 QG_{46}	—	October 24, 2009	Kitt Peak	Spacewatch	·	2.5 km	MPC · JPL
426443	2013 QK_{46}	—	April 9, 2010	WISE	WISE	·	5.0 km	MPC · JPL
426444	2013 QT_{48}	—	March 25, 2008	Kitt Peak	Spacewatch	·	820 m	MPC · JPL
426445	2013 QV_{54}	—	January 13, 2005	Kitt Peak	Spacewatch	·	2.9 km	MPC · JPL
426446	2013 QR_{56}	—	May 12, 2012	Mount Lemmon	Mount Lemmon Survey	·	2.5 km	MPC · JPL
426447	2013 QF_{57}	—	September 18, 2006	Kitt Peak	Spacewatch	·	1.2 km	MPC · JPL
426448	2013 QK_{57}	—	October 2, 2006	Mount Lemmon	Mount Lemmon Survey	·	960 m	MPC · JPL
426449	2013 QE_{59}	—	March 4, 2011	Mount Lemmon	Mount Lemmon Survey	·	1.7 km	MPC · JPL
426450	2013 QX_{59}	—	April 1, 1995	Kitt Peak	Spacewatch	·	880 m	MPC · JPL
426451	2013 QR_{61}	—	August 27, 2009	Catalina	CSS	·	1.1 km	MPC · JPL
426452	2013 QS_{63}	—	December 27, 2006	Mount Lemmon	Mount Lemmon Survey	·	1.0 km	MPC · JPL
426453	2013 QW_{64}	—	October 26, 2005	Kitt Peak	Spacewatch	·	1.3 km	MPC · JPL
426454	2013 QZ_{64}	—	November 16, 1999	Kitt Peak	Spacewatch	·	940 m	MPC · JPL
426455	2013 QH_{66}	—	November 22, 2006	Catalina	CSS	·	1.3 km	MPC · JPL
426456	2013 QE_{68}	—	September 14, 2009	Catalina	CSS	·	1.9 km	MPC · JPL
426457	2013 QR_{70}	—	October 17, 2009	Catalina	CSS	·	1.8 km	MPC · JPL
426458	2013 QE_{72}	—	August 28, 2006	Anderson Mesa	LONEOS	V	760 m	MPC · JPL
426459	2013 QM_{72}	—	November 10, 2009	Kitt Peak	Spacewatch	·	1.7 km	MPC · JPL
426460	2013 QC_{73}	—	January 30, 2008	Kitt Peak	Spacewatch	·	740 m	MPC · JPL
426461	2013 QS_{73}	—	January 17, 2005	Kitt Peak	Spacewatch	·	650 m	MPC · JPL
426462	2013 QU_{73}	—	April 19, 2012	Mount Lemmon	Mount Lemmon Survey	MAR	1.1 km	MPC · JPL
426463	2013 QG_{75}	—	January 9, 2006	Kitt Peak	Spacewatch	·	2.3 km	MPC · JPL
426464	2013 QW_{77}	—	November 9, 2009	Kitt Peak	Spacewatch	·	2.2 km	MPC · JPL
426465	2013 QO_{82}	—	January 28, 2011	Mount Lemmon	Mount Lemmon Survey	·	2.0 km	MPC · JPL
426466	2013 QW_{82}	—	August 5, 2005	Siding Spring	SSS	·	2.1 km	MPC · JPL
426467	2013 QJ_{83}	—	October 2, 2000	Socorro	LINEAR	EUN	1.3 km	MPC · JPL
426468	2013 QO_{83}	—	May 25, 2006	Kitt Peak	Spacewatch	·	830 m	MPC · JPL
426469	2013 QO_{84}	—	September 29, 2009	Mount Lemmon	Mount Lemmon Survey	JUN	1.1 km	MPC · JPL
426470	2013 QP_{84}	—	March 27, 2008	Mount Lemmon	Mount Lemmon Survey	·	1.6 km	MPC · JPL
426471	2013 QA_{93}	—	September 21, 2009	Kitt Peak	Spacewatch	·	1.5 km	MPC · JPL
426472	2013 QB_{93}	—	March 13, 2008	Kitt Peak	Spacewatch	·	1.5 km	MPC · JPL
426473	2013 QS_{93}	—	May 8, 2006	Mount Lemmon	Mount Lemmon Survey	·	550 m	MPC · JPL
426474	2013 RK	—	October 30, 2009	Mount Lemmon	Mount Lemmon Survey	·	1.5 km	MPC · JPL
426475	2013 RW	—	October 26, 2009	Kitt Peak	Spacewatch	MIS	2.3 km	MPC · JPL
426476	2013 RV_{2}	—	September 7, 2008	Mount Lemmon	Mount Lemmon Survey	·	2.8 km	MPC · JPL
426477	2013 RH_{5}	—	October 24, 2009	Kitt Peak	Spacewatch	·	1.2 km	MPC · JPL
426478	2013 RW_{6}	—	November 30, 2005	Kitt Peak	Spacewatch	·	1.7 km	MPC · JPL
426479	2013 RE_{7}	—	October 21, 2007	Mount Lemmon	Mount Lemmon Survey	·	700 m	MPC · JPL
426480	2013 RG_{16}	—	January 30, 2006	Kitt Peak	Spacewatch	·	1.9 km	MPC · JPL
426481	2013 RY_{16}	—	October 30, 1999	Socorro	LINEAR	·	1.5 km	MPC · JPL
426482	2013 RH_{17}	—	December 6, 2005	Kitt Peak	Spacewatch	·	1.3 km	MPC · JPL
426483	2013 RK_{17}	—	October 27, 2005	Catalina	CSS	·	1.3 km	MPC · JPL
426484	2013 RW_{17}	—	January 17, 2007	Kitt Peak	Spacewatch	·	1.5 km	MPC · JPL
426485	2013 RU_{18}	—	April 16, 2005	Kitt Peak	Spacewatch	NYS	1.3 km	MPC · JPL
426486	2013 RB_{20}	—	December 6, 1996	Kitt Peak	Spacewatch	·	1.8 km	MPC · JPL
426487	2013 RA_{22}	—	November 15, 1995	Kitt Peak	Spacewatch	·	2.4 km	MPC · JPL
426488	2013 RB_{23}	—	March 2, 2006	Kitt Peak	Spacewatch	·	2.0 km	MPC · JPL
426489	2013 RW_{23}	—	August 21, 2008	Kitt Peak	Spacewatch	·	1.5 km	MPC · JPL
426490	2013 RB_{24}	—	September 25, 2008	Kitt Peak	Spacewatch	·	2.7 km	MPC · JPL
426491	2013 RH_{25}	—	April 11, 2005	Mount Lemmon	Mount Lemmon Survey	·	940 m	MPC · JPL
426492	2013 RM_{25}	—	September 19, 2007	Mount Lemmon	Mount Lemmon Survey	·	3.0 km	MPC · JPL
426493	2013 RG_{29}	—	March 2, 2011	Kitt Peak	Spacewatch	·	1.6 km	MPC · JPL
426494	2013 RN_{31}	—	August 25, 2004	Kitt Peak	Spacewatch	·	2.3 km	MPC · JPL
426495	2013 RY_{31}	—	November 17, 2009	Mount Lemmon	Mount Lemmon Survey	AGN	1.1 km	MPC · JPL
426496	2013 RS_{32}	—	July 30, 2009	Catalina	CSS	·	1.6 km	MPC · JPL
426497	2013 RJ_{33}	—	October 3, 2006	Mount Lemmon	Mount Lemmon Survey	·	1.1 km	MPC · JPL
426498	2013 RK_{33}	—	June 16, 2005	Kitt Peak	Spacewatch	MAS	840 m	MPC · JPL
426499	2013 RB_{34}	—	February 7, 2002	Kitt Peak	Spacewatch	·	860 m	MPC · JPL
426500	2013 RE_{35}	—	October 12, 1999	Socorro	LINEAR	·	2.8 km	MPC · JPL

== 426501–426600 ==
back to top

Designation			Discovery			Properties		Ref
Permanent	Provisional	Named after	Date	Site	Discoverer(s)	Category	Diam.	Ref
426501	2013 RJ_{35}	—	April 1, 2008	Kitt Peak	Spacewatch	·	1.7 km	MPC · JPL
426502	2013 RS_{35}	—	October 27, 2008	Mount Lemmon	Mount Lemmon Survey	·	3.6 km	MPC · JPL
426503	2013 RU_{35}	—	November 19, 2004	Catalina	CSS	·	2.4 km	MPC · JPL
426504	2013 RO_{37}	—	March 10, 2011	Kitt Peak	Spacewatch	·	2.4 km	MPC · JPL
426505	2013 RP_{37}	—	October 10, 2005	Kitt Peak	Spacewatch	·	1.6 km	MPC · JPL
426506	2013 RT_{37}	—	September 22, 2008	Mount Lemmon	Mount Lemmon Survey	·	2.3 km	MPC · JPL
426507	2013 RX_{38}	—	October 4, 2007	Mount Lemmon	Mount Lemmon Survey	·	3.0 km	MPC · JPL
426508	2013 RE_{39}	—	October 30, 2008	Kitt Peak	Spacewatch	THM	2.2 km	MPC · JPL
426509	2013 RS_{39}	—	March 1, 2011	Mount Lemmon	Mount Lemmon Survey	·	1.9 km	MPC · JPL
426510	2013 RH_{41}	—	February 8, 2008	Kitt Peak	Spacewatch	NYS	1.1 km	MPC · JPL
426511	2013 RR_{41}	—	October 23, 2009	Mount Lemmon	Mount Lemmon Survey	·	1.7 km	MPC · JPL
426512	2013 RV_{41}	—	March 27, 2009	Mount Lemmon	Mount Lemmon Survey	·	800 m	MPC · JPL
426513	2013 RZ_{43}	—	March 27, 2010	WISE	WISE	·	3.8 km	MPC · JPL
426514	2013 RU_{44}	—	September 29, 2009	Mount Lemmon	Mount Lemmon Survey	·	1.4 km	MPC · JPL
426515	2013 RW_{44}	—	September 6, 2003	Campo Imperatore	CINEOS	TEL	2.0 km	MPC · JPL
426516	2013 RK_{46}	—	October 6, 1999	Socorro	LINEAR	·	2.4 km	MPC · JPL
426517	2013 RL_{46}	—	September 26, 2008	Kitt Peak	Spacewatch	·	1.9 km	MPC · JPL
426518	2013 RM_{46}	—	August 31, 2005	Kitt Peak	Spacewatch	·	950 m	MPC · JPL
426519	2013 RN_{46}	—	October 26, 2009	Mount Lemmon	Mount Lemmon Survey	·	1.6 km	MPC · JPL
426520	2013 RK_{47}	—	December 25, 2010	Mount Lemmon	Mount Lemmon Survey	·	1.2 km	MPC · JPL
426521	2013 RQ_{48}	—	January 28, 2004	Kitt Peak	Spacewatch	·	1.1 km	MPC · JPL
426522	2013 RG_{49}	—	January 28, 2011	Mount Lemmon	Mount Lemmon Survey	·	1.4 km	MPC · JPL
426523	2013 RO_{49}	—	October 1, 2005	Catalina	CSS	·	1.0 km	MPC · JPL
426524 Rainerhannig	2013 RH_{52}	Rainerhannig	October 26, 2009	Mount Lemmon	Mount Lemmon Survey	·	2.0 km	MPC · JPL
426525	2013 RT_{52}	—	August 9, 2013	Kitt Peak	Spacewatch	·	1.8 km	MPC · JPL
426526	2013 RX_{53}	—	September 30, 2006	Kitt Peak	Spacewatch	·	920 m	MPC · JPL
426527	2013 RO_{56}	—	December 9, 2001	Socorro	LINEAR	·	1.9 km	MPC · JPL
426528	2013 RZ_{56}	—	April 12, 2010	WISE	WISE	·	3.1 km	MPC · JPL
426529	2013 RX_{58}	—	March 11, 2005	Mount Lemmon	Mount Lemmon Survey	VER	2.7 km	MPC · JPL
426530	2013 RY_{60}	—	August 13, 2007	Socorro	LINEAR	·	3.9 km	MPC · JPL
426531	2013 RU_{63}	—	October 28, 1995	Kitt Peak	Spacewatch	AGN	1.1 km	MPC · JPL
426532	2013 RY_{64}	—	September 9, 2008	Catalina	CSS	·	2.9 km	MPC · JPL
426533	2013 RS_{66}	—	September 29, 2005	Kitt Peak	Spacewatch	·	940 m	MPC · JPL
426534	2013 RV_{67}	—	October 2, 2000	Anderson Mesa	LONEOS	·	690 m	MPC · JPL
426535	2013 RT_{70}	—	November 20, 2003	Socorro	LINEAR	·	810 m	MPC · JPL
426536	2013 RW_{70}	—	February 25, 2007	Kitt Peak	Spacewatch	·	1.4 km	MPC · JPL
426537	2013 RM_{71}	—	December 27, 2005	Kitt Peak	Spacewatch	·	1.8 km	MPC · JPL
426538	2013 RC_{77}	—	October 30, 2005	Mount Lemmon	Mount Lemmon Survey	·	990 m	MPC · JPL
426539	2013 RL_{79}	—	September 15, 2004	Kitt Peak	Spacewatch	·	2.6 km	MPC · JPL
426540	2013 RV_{79}	—	October 11, 2004	Kitt Peak	Spacewatch	(18466)	2.4 km	MPC · JPL
426541	2013 RX_{81}	—	March 23, 2012	Mount Lemmon	Mount Lemmon Survey	MAS	710 m	MPC · JPL
426542	2013 RZ_{81}	—	March 14, 2007	Mount Lemmon	Mount Lemmon Survey	RAF	660 m	MPC · JPL
426543	2013 RH_{82}	—	March 3, 2005	Kitt Peak	Spacewatch	·	2.5 km	MPC · JPL
426544	2013 RZ_{83}	—	September 10, 2007	Kitt Peak	Spacewatch	·	2.6 km	MPC · JPL
426545	2013 RL_{84}	—	November 25, 2005	Mount Lemmon	Mount Lemmon Survey	·	2.0 km	MPC · JPL
426546	2013 RN_{84}	—	October 17, 2003	Kitt Peak	Spacewatch	·	1.9 km	MPC · JPL
426547	2013 RS_{84}	—	February 7, 2011	Mount Lemmon	Mount Lemmon Survey	(5)	1.5 km	MPC · JPL
426548	2013 RT_{84}	—	November 9, 2004	Catalina	CSS	GEF	1.3 km	MPC · JPL
426549	2013 RW_{84}	—	March 16, 2007	Kitt Peak	Spacewatch	WIT	1.1 km	MPC · JPL
426550	2013 RC_{87}	—	September 5, 2013	Kitt Peak	Spacewatch	·	3.9 km	MPC · JPL
426551	2013 RE_{87}	—	March 14, 2007	Mount Lemmon	Mount Lemmon Survey	·	1.6 km	MPC · JPL
426552	2013 RH_{87}	—	March 12, 2007	Catalina	CSS	·	2.1 km	MPC · JPL
426553	2013 RY_{87}	—	April 1, 2011	Mount Lemmon	Mount Lemmon Survey	·	2.0 km	MPC · JPL
426554	2013 RR_{88}	—	January 31, 2006	Kitt Peak	Spacewatch	·	1.9 km	MPC · JPL
426555	2013 RU_{88}	—	April 3, 2009	Mount Lemmon	Mount Lemmon Survey	·	740 m	MPC · JPL
426556	2013 RR_{89}	—	January 8, 2006	Mount Lemmon	Mount Lemmon Survey	AGN	1.4 km	MPC · JPL
426557	2013 RV_{89}	—	July 24, 2000	Kitt Peak	Spacewatch	·	1.4 km	MPC · JPL
426558	2013 RV_{91}	—	May 13, 2008	Siding Spring	SSS	·	1.9 km	MPC · JPL
426559	2013 RU_{92}	—	October 15, 1995	Kitt Peak	Spacewatch	·	1.7 km	MPC · JPL
426560	2013 RD_{93}	—	July 29, 2008	Kitt Peak	Spacewatch	·	1.7 km	MPC · JPL
426561	2013 RV_{93}	—	September 16, 2003	Kitt Peak	Spacewatch	KOR	1.4 km	MPC · JPL
426562	2013 RL_{94}	—	December 28, 2003	Kitt Peak	Spacewatch	·	2.7 km	MPC · JPL
426563	2013 RD_{97}	—	September 14, 2009	Catalina	CSS	·	1.4 km	MPC · JPL
426564	2013 RF_{97}	—	November 4, 2004	Catalina	CSS	·	2.3 km	MPC · JPL
426565	2013 RJ_{97}	—	March 8, 2005	Kitt Peak	Spacewatch	·	800 m	MPC · JPL
426566	2013 RL_{97}	—	March 13, 2011	Kitt Peak	Spacewatch	·	2.0 km	MPC · JPL
426567	2013 RU_{97}	—	August 5, 2003	Kitt Peak	Spacewatch	EOS	2.0 km	MPC · JPL
426568	2013 SG	—	December 26, 2006	Kitt Peak	Spacewatch	ADE	2.2 km	MPC · JPL
426569	2013 SL_{8}	—	September 17, 2006	Catalina	CSS	V	750 m	MPC · JPL
426570	2013 SK_{11}	—	March 16, 2007	Mount Lemmon	Mount Lemmon Survey	·	1.7 km	MPC · JPL
426571	2013 SA_{14}	—	September 15, 2009	Kitt Peak	Spacewatch	(5)	1.2 km	MPC · JPL
426572	2013 SA_{15}	—	September 18, 2009	Kitt Peak	Spacewatch	(5)	1.1 km	MPC · JPL
426573	2013 SD_{16}	—	May 2, 2006	Mount Lemmon	Mount Lemmon Survey	·	2.8 km	MPC · JPL
426574	2013 SF_{17}	—	September 20, 2009	Kitt Peak	Spacewatch	MAR	1.1 km	MPC · JPL
426575	2013 SS_{17}	—	October 26, 2009	Mount Lemmon	Mount Lemmon Survey	·	3.2 km	MPC · JPL
426576	2013 SA_{19}	—	March 20, 2007	Mount Lemmon	Mount Lemmon Survey	·	2.4 km	MPC · JPL
426577	2013 SL_{22}	—	April 15, 2007	Kitt Peak	Spacewatch	·	2.6 km	MPC · JPL
426578	2013 SO_{23}	—	September 8, 2004	Socorro	LINEAR	·	1.5 km	MPC · JPL
426579	2013 SX_{23}	—	October 1, 2009	Mount Lemmon	Mount Lemmon Survey	·	2.8 km	MPC · JPL
426580	2013 SC_{24}	—	April 2, 2006	Kitt Peak	Spacewatch	·	2.1 km	MPC · JPL
426581	2013 SH_{26}	—	February 4, 2006	Kitt Peak	Spacewatch	GEF	1.5 km	MPC · JPL
426582	2013 SV_{26}	—	September 19, 2009	Kitt Peak	Spacewatch	·	1.2 km	MPC · JPL
426583	2013 SV_{27}	—	December 20, 2009	Kitt Peak	Spacewatch	·	2.7 km	MPC · JPL
426584	2013 SA_{28}	—	February 22, 2004	Kitt Peak	Spacewatch	·	3.1 km	MPC · JPL
426585	2013 SS_{28}	—	March 5, 2008	Kitt Peak	Spacewatch	V	630 m	MPC · JPL
426586	2013 SU_{28}	—	February 14, 2010	Kitt Peak	Spacewatch	EOS	2.3 km	MPC · JPL
426587	2013 SV_{28}	—	September 18, 2007	Anderson Mesa	LONEOS	·	4.0 km	MPC · JPL
426588	2013 SD_{29}	—	December 4, 2007	Kitt Peak	Spacewatch	·	960 m	MPC · JPL
426589	2013 SR_{29}	—	November 19, 2008	Kitt Peak	Spacewatch	·	4.0 km	MPC · JPL
426590	2013 SB_{30}	—	March 20, 2007	Kitt Peak	Spacewatch	·	1.9 km	MPC · JPL
426591	2013 SC_{31}	—	February 22, 2012	Kitt Peak	Spacewatch	·	1.8 km	MPC · JPL
426592	2013 SS_{31}	—	March 26, 2006	Kitt Peak	Spacewatch	·	700 m	MPC · JPL
426593	2013 SP_{33}	—	March 26, 2004	Kitt Peak	Spacewatch	·	1.4 km	MPC · JPL
426594	2013 SS_{33}	—	February 6, 2006	Kitt Peak	Spacewatch	·	2.1 km	MPC · JPL
426595	2013 SG_{34}	—	September 15, 2004	Kitt Peak	Spacewatch	·	3.5 km	MPC · JPL
426596	2013 SQ_{34}	—	March 2, 2011	Mount Lemmon	Mount Lemmon Survey	·	2.7 km	MPC · JPL
426597	2013 SJ_{36}	—	February 2, 2008	Kitt Peak	Spacewatch	CLA	1.4 km	MPC · JPL
426598	2013 SO_{36}	—	March 13, 1997	Kitt Peak	Spacewatch	·	1.0 km	MPC · JPL
426599	2013 SW_{37}	—	January 26, 2006	Mount Lemmon	Mount Lemmon Survey	·	1.9 km	MPC · JPL
426600	2013 SK_{38}	—	November 20, 2009	Mount Lemmon	Mount Lemmon Survey	·	1.8 km	MPC · JPL

== 426601–426700 ==
back to top

Designation			Discovery			Properties		Ref
Permanent	Provisional	Named after	Date	Site	Discoverer(s)	Category	Diam.	Ref
426601	2013 SN_{38}	—	October 1, 2005	Kitt Peak	Spacewatch	·	1.1 km	MPC · JPL
426602	2013 SV_{38}	—	February 25, 2011	Kitt Peak	Spacewatch	·	2.6 km	MPC · JPL
426603	2013 SA_{39}	—	November 20, 2008	Kitt Peak	Spacewatch	·	2.6 km	MPC · JPL
426604	2013 SL_{40}	—	July 24, 2000	Kitt Peak	Spacewatch	·	1.9 km	MPC · JPL
426605	2013 SW_{40}	—	September 23, 2004	Kitt Peak	Spacewatch	·	1.7 km	MPC · JPL
426606	2013 SF_{41}	—	February 19, 2004	Socorro	LINEAR	T_{j} (2.98)	3.4 km	MPC · JPL
426607	2013 SD_{43}	—	October 17, 1995	Kitt Peak	Spacewatch	·	2.2 km	MPC · JPL
426608	2013 SS_{43}	—	July 18, 2009	Siding Spring	SSS	PHO	1.3 km	MPC · JPL
426609	2013 SE_{44}	—	September 12, 2007	Kitt Peak	Spacewatch	·	3.0 km	MPC · JPL
426610	2013 SF_{44}	—	November 9, 2009	Catalina	CSS	·	1.5 km	MPC · JPL
426611	2013 SQ_{46}	—	November 9, 2007	Mount Lemmon	Mount Lemmon Survey	·	660 m	MPC · JPL
426612	2013 SY_{46}	—	December 7, 2005	Kitt Peak	Spacewatch	(12739)	1.7 km	MPC · JPL
426613	2013 SR_{49}	—	October 15, 2004	Mount Lemmon	Mount Lemmon Survey	·	2.6 km	MPC · JPL
426614	2013 SU_{50}	—	October 4, 2002	Campo Imperatore	CINEOS	·	2.4 km	MPC · JPL
426615	2013 SZ_{52}	—	May 11, 1996	Kitt Peak	Spacewatch	·	820 m	MPC · JPL
426616	2013 SH_{53}	—	August 30, 2005	Kitt Peak	Spacewatch	T_{j} (2.97) · 3:2	4.7 km	MPC · JPL
426617	2013 SV_{54}	—	March 4, 2005	Mount Lemmon	Mount Lemmon Survey	·	2.5 km	MPC · JPL
426618	2013 SG_{55}	—	November 17, 2009	Kitt Peak	Spacewatch	·	2.6 km	MPC · JPL
426619	2013 SL_{55}	—	January 28, 2004	Kitt Peak	Spacewatch	THM	2.4 km	MPC · JPL
426620	2013 SE_{57}	—	March 11, 2008	Kitt Peak	Spacewatch	·	1.5 km	MPC · JPL
426621	2013 SP_{58}	—	March 16, 2005	Catalina	CSS	·	1.2 km	MPC · JPL
426622	2013 SW_{58}	—	October 23, 2009	Kitt Peak	Spacewatch	·	1.5 km	MPC · JPL
426623	2013 SV_{59}	—	January 27, 2011	Kitt Peak	Spacewatch	·	2.0 km	MPC · JPL
426624	2013 SA_{60}	—	February 25, 2011	Mount Lemmon	Mount Lemmon Survey	·	1.5 km	MPC · JPL
426625	2013 SJ_{60}	—	September 19, 2003	Socorro	LINEAR	·	870 m	MPC · JPL
426626	2013 SR_{60}	—	September 24, 2000	Socorro	LINEAR	·	750 m	MPC · JPL
426627	2013 SW_{61}	—	February 25, 2006	Mount Lemmon	Mount Lemmon Survey	KOR	1.7 km	MPC · JPL
426628	2013 SM_{62}	—	October 21, 2008	Kitt Peak	Spacewatch	·	2.8 km	MPC · JPL
426629	2013 SX_{62}	—	April 20, 2009	Kitt Peak	Spacewatch	·	660 m	MPC · JPL
426630	2013 SU_{63}	—	February 27, 2008	Mount Lemmon	Mount Lemmon Survey	·	1.2 km	MPC · JPL
426631	2013 SC_{64}	—	August 28, 2006	Catalina	CSS	·	830 m	MPC · JPL
426632	2013 SR_{64}	—	September 17, 2009	Mount Lemmon	Mount Lemmon Survey	·	1.4 km	MPC · JPL
426633	2013 SO_{66}	—	July 5, 2005	Siding Spring	SSS	·	1.7 km	MPC · JPL
426634	2013 SZ_{66}	—	August 29, 2006	Kitt Peak	Spacewatch	·	770 m	MPC · JPL
426635	2013 SM_{67}	—	January 19, 2008	Mount Lemmon	Mount Lemmon Survey	·	610 m	MPC · JPL
426636	2013 ST_{67}	—	November 25, 2005	Catalina	CSS	(5)	1.3 km	MPC · JPL
426637	2013 SG_{68}	—	March 26, 2007	Kitt Peak	Spacewatch	·	2.0 km	MPC · JPL
426638	2013 SJ_{70}	—	November 1, 2005	Kitt Peak	Spacewatch	·	900 m	MPC · JPL
426639	2013 SE_{71}	—	September 24, 2000	Socorro	LINEAR	·	1.5 km	MPC · JPL
426640	2013 SW_{71}	—	March 28, 2011	Mount Lemmon	Mount Lemmon Survey	·	2.3 km	MPC · JPL
426641	2013 SA_{72}	—	January 20, 2008	Kitt Peak	Spacewatch	·	1.1 km	MPC · JPL
426642	2013 SG_{72}	—	February 24, 2006	Kitt Peak	Spacewatch	·	2.0 km	MPC · JPL
426643	2013 SZ_{72}	—	November 17, 2009	Catalina	CSS	EUN	1.4 km	MPC · JPL
426644	2013 SE_{75}	—	September 28, 2006	Kitt Peak	Spacewatch	·	740 m	MPC · JPL
426645	2013 SJ_{75}	—	March 10, 2007	Kitt Peak	Spacewatch	(5)	1.1 km	MPC · JPL
426646	2013 SX_{75}	—	August 16, 2002	Kitt Peak	Spacewatch	·	3.3 km	MPC · JPL
426647	2013 SB_{76}	—	September 29, 1995	Kitt Peak	Spacewatch	MRX	730 m	MPC · JPL
426648	2013 SV_{78}	—	February 2, 2006	Mount Lemmon	Mount Lemmon Survey	·	1.7 km	MPC · JPL
426649	2013 SD_{79}	—	January 14, 2008	Kitt Peak	Spacewatch	·	910 m	MPC · JPL
426650	2013 SR_{79}	—	October 15, 2009	Catalina	CSS	·	1.7 km	MPC · JPL
426651	2013 SO_{80}	—	August 15, 2009	Kitt Peak	Spacewatch	·	1.5 km	MPC · JPL
426652	2013 SC_{81}	—	October 13, 1998	Kitt Peak	Spacewatch	MAS	790 m	MPC · JPL
426653	2013 SA_{82}	—	June 27, 2006	Siding Spring	SSS	PHO	1.4 km	MPC · JPL
426654	2013 SB_{84}	—	September 5, 2007	Catalina	CSS	(1118)	4.8 km	MPC · JPL
426655	2013 SD_{84}	—	October 23, 2004	Kitt Peak	Spacewatch	·	2.0 km	MPC · JPL
426656	2013 SB_{86}	—	December 30, 2008	Catalina	CSS	TIR	3.1 km	MPC · JPL
426657	2013 SL_{86}	—	March 4, 2006	Mount Lemmon	Mount Lemmon Survey	·	2.4 km	MPC · JPL
426658	2013 TW_{1}	—	November 17, 2000	Kitt Peak	Spacewatch	·	2.2 km	MPC · JPL
426659	2013 TA_{2}	—	December 4, 2003	Socorro	LINEAR	·	1.1 km	MPC · JPL
426660	2013 TP_{2}	—	December 3, 2010	Mount Lemmon	Mount Lemmon Survey	·	880 m	MPC · JPL
426661	2013 TW_{2}	—	February 21, 2007	Kitt Peak	Spacewatch	(17392)	1.5 km	MPC · JPL
426662	2013 TZ_{2}	—	November 19, 2009	Catalina	CSS	·	1.9 km	MPC · JPL
426663	2013 TR_{3}	—	August 3, 2008	Siding Spring	SSS	·	3.1 km	MPC · JPL
426664	2013 TS_{3}	—	November 20, 2009	Mount Lemmon	Mount Lemmon Survey	·	2.5 km	MPC · JPL
426665	2013 TF_{7}	—	November 4, 2004	Kitt Peak	Spacewatch	·	2.3 km	MPC · JPL
426666	2013 TO_{7}	—	October 17, 2009	Catalina	CSS	·	3.2 km	MPC · JPL
426667	2013 TU_{8}	—	August 28, 2006	Kitt Peak	Spacewatch	·	680 m	MPC · JPL
426668	2013 TV_{8}	—	November 11, 2006	Catalina	CSS	·	1.6 km	MPC · JPL
426669	2013 TC_{9}	—	April 2, 2006	Kitt Peak	Spacewatch	·	2.3 km	MPC · JPL
426670	2013 TR_{13}	—	January 30, 2006	Kitt Peak	Spacewatch	HOF	2.4 km	MPC · JPL
426671	2013 TX_{13}	—	April 18, 2002	Kitt Peak	Spacewatch	·	740 m	MPC · JPL
426672	2013 TZ_{13}	—	November 17, 2009	Mount Lemmon	Mount Lemmon Survey	·	1.5 km	MPC · JPL
426673	2013 TH_{14}	—	July 28, 2007	Mauna Kea	P. A. Wiegert, N. I. Hasan	·	2.0 km	MPC · JPL
426674	2013 TV_{14}	—	September 10, 2007	Catalina	CSS	·	3.4 km	MPC · JPL
426675	2013 TD_{15}	—	July 2, 2005	Kitt Peak	Spacewatch	·	920 m	MPC · JPL
426676	2013 TX_{17}	—	October 9, 2007	Kitt Peak	Spacewatch	·	2.9 km	MPC · JPL
426677	2013 TS_{18}	—	January 11, 2010	Kitt Peak	Spacewatch	·	2.4 km	MPC · JPL
426678	2013 TB_{19}	—	November 25, 2006	Kitt Peak	Spacewatch	·	1.4 km	MPC · JPL
426679	2013 TM_{19}	—	March 16, 2007	Kitt Peak	Spacewatch	·	2.0 km	MPC · JPL
426680	2013 TS_{19}	—	October 31, 1999	Kitt Peak	Spacewatch	·	1.9 km	MPC · JPL
426681	2013 TL_{20}	—	March 1, 2005	Kitt Peak	Spacewatch	THM	3.0 km	MPC · JPL
426682	2013 TF_{21}	—	October 20, 2003	Kitt Peak	Spacewatch	·	850 m	MPC · JPL
426683	2013 TO_{21}	—	September 23, 2008	Kitt Peak	Spacewatch	·	1.6 km	MPC · JPL
426684	2013 TQ_{21}	—	November 6, 2008	Kitt Peak	Spacewatch	·	2.8 km	MPC · JPL
426685	2013 TA_{22}	—	December 3, 2005	Kitt Peak	Spacewatch	·	1.3 km	MPC · JPL
426686	2013 TB_{22}	—	October 6, 2004	Kitt Peak	Spacewatch	·	1.6 km	MPC · JPL
426687	2013 TZ_{22}	—	January 8, 2006	Kitt Peak	Spacewatch	AST	1.8 km	MPC · JPL
426688	2013 TQ_{23}	—	February 17, 2010	Kitt Peak	Spacewatch	THM	2.2 km	MPC · JPL
426689	2013 TC_{26}	—	March 9, 2005	Kitt Peak	Spacewatch	·	2.8 km	MPC · JPL
426690	2013 TM_{26}	—	February 27, 2007	Kitt Peak	Spacewatch	·	1.5 km	MPC · JPL
426691	2013 TU_{26}	—	October 7, 2004	Kitt Peak	Spacewatch	·	1.6 km	MPC · JPL
426692	2013 TC_{27}	—	March 27, 1995	Kitt Peak	Spacewatch	·	690 m	MPC · JPL
426693	2013 TT_{27}	—	May 13, 1996	Kitt Peak	Spacewatch	EOS	1.6 km	MPC · JPL
426694	2013 TG_{28}	—	August 23, 2008	Kitt Peak	Spacewatch	KOR	1.5 km	MPC · JPL
426695	2013 TR_{28}	—	February 27, 2006	Kitt Peak	Spacewatch	·	2.3 km	MPC · JPL
426696	2013 TW_{28}	—	July 4, 2005	Kitt Peak	Spacewatch	V	680 m	MPC · JPL
426697	2013 TP_{29}	—	September 16, 2003	Kitt Peak	Spacewatch	AGN	1.5 km	MPC · JPL
426698	2013 TX_{30}	—	October 18, 2003	Kitt Peak	Spacewatch	·	770 m	MPC · JPL
426699	2013 TY_{30}	—	January 14, 2008	Kitt Peak	Spacewatch	·	780 m	MPC · JPL
426700	2013 TQ_{31}	—	March 9, 2005	Mount Lemmon	Mount Lemmon Survey	·	3.0 km	MPC · JPL

== 426701–426800 ==
back to top

Designation			Discovery			Properties		Ref
Permanent	Provisional	Named after	Date	Site	Discoverer(s)	Category	Diam.	Ref
426701	2013 TS_{31}	—	November 16, 1998	Kitt Peak	Spacewatch	·	1.4 km	MPC · JPL
426702	2013 TD_{32}	—	March 2, 2009	Kitt Peak	Spacewatch	·	820 m	MPC · JPL
426703	2013 TM_{32}	—	October 9, 1999	Kitt Peak	Spacewatch	·	2.3 km	MPC · JPL
426704	2013 TN_{32}	—	September 18, 2003	Kitt Peak	Spacewatch	·	1.9 km	MPC · JPL
426705	2013 TR_{33}	—	September 5, 2010	Mount Lemmon	Mount Lemmon Survey	·	790 m	MPC · JPL
426706	2013 TN_{34}	—	April 25, 2000	Kitt Peak	Spacewatch	PHO	1.1 km	MPC · JPL
426707	2013 TS_{34}	—	January 8, 2010	WISE	WISE	·	2.8 km	MPC · JPL
426708	2013 TQ_{36}	—	January 10, 2006	Mount Lemmon	Mount Lemmon Survey	·	1.7 km	MPC · JPL
426709	2013 TN_{37}	—	February 21, 2007	Kitt Peak	Spacewatch	KON	2.5 km	MPC · JPL
426710	2013 TH_{39}	—	October 9, 2004	Kitt Peak	Spacewatch	·	2.0 km	MPC · JPL
426711	2013 TX_{39}	—	September 18, 2009	Kitt Peak	Spacewatch	·	1.3 km	MPC · JPL
426712	2013 TJ_{40}	—	October 13, 2004	Kitt Peak	Spacewatch	·	2.0 km	MPC · JPL
426713	2013 TE_{41}	—	March 21, 2010	WISE	WISE	HOF	3.7 km	MPC · JPL
426714	2013 TO_{42}	—	September 6, 2008	Mount Lemmon	Mount Lemmon Survey	DOR	2.7 km	MPC · JPL
426715	2013 TQ_{43}	—	September 13, 1998	Kitt Peak	Spacewatch	·	1.1 km	MPC · JPL
426716	2013 TF_{45}	—	October 19, 2003	Kitt Peak	Spacewatch	·	790 m	MPC · JPL
426717	2013 TT_{45}	—	February 12, 2008	Kitt Peak	Spacewatch	NYS	1.2 km	MPC · JPL
426718	2013 TP_{46}	—	October 2, 2008	Kitt Peak	Spacewatch	·	1.3 km	MPC · JPL
426719	2013 TC_{47}	—	March 11, 2007	Mount Lemmon	Mount Lemmon Survey	·	1.4 km	MPC · JPL
426720	2013 TJ_{47}	—	December 11, 2004	Kitt Peak	Spacewatch	·	1.9 km	MPC · JPL
426721	2013 TP_{49}	—	September 28, 2008	Mount Lemmon	Mount Lemmon Survey	·	2.9 km	MPC · JPL
426722	2013 TZ_{50}	—	October 1, 2000	Socorro	LINEAR	·	1.7 km	MPC · JPL
426723	2013 TM_{51}	—	October 3, 2013	Mount Lemmon	Mount Lemmon Survey	L5	8.5 km	MPC · JPL
426724	2013 TX_{51}	—	September 9, 2008	Mount Lemmon	Mount Lemmon Survey	·	1.5 km	MPC · JPL
426725	2013 TM_{52}	—	August 23, 2008	Siding Spring	SSS	DOR	2.6 km	MPC · JPL
426726	2013 TQ_{52}	—	March 14, 2007	Mount Lemmon	Mount Lemmon Survey	EUN	1.5 km	MPC · JPL
426727	2013 TU_{52}	—	June 12, 2012	Kitt Peak	Spacewatch	VER	3.5 km	MPC · JPL
426728	2013 TW_{52}	—	September 16, 2004	Anderson Mesa	LONEOS	·	1.7 km	MPC · JPL
426729	2013 TH_{53}	—	March 10, 2007	Kitt Peak	Spacewatch	·	2.7 km	MPC · JPL
426730	2013 TS_{57}	—	October 30, 2008	Kitt Peak	Spacewatch	·	2.4 km	MPC · JPL
426731	2013 TY_{58}	—	September 12, 2007	Mount Lemmon	Mount Lemmon Survey	·	2.6 km	MPC · JPL
426732	2013 TP_{60}	—	January 16, 2004	Anderson Mesa	LONEOS	·	3.2 km	MPC · JPL
426733	2013 TV_{63}	—	December 4, 2005	Kitt Peak	Spacewatch	·	1.3 km	MPC · JPL
426734	2013 TF_{67}	—	December 29, 2005	Socorro	LINEAR	·	2.0 km	MPC · JPL
426735	2013 TE_{72}	—	October 7, 2004	Kitt Peak	Spacewatch	·	2.0 km	MPC · JPL
426736	2013 TZ_{72}	—	November 18, 2006	Kitt Peak	Spacewatch	·	1.2 km	MPC · JPL
426737	2013 TY_{75}	—	March 30, 2011	Mount Lemmon	Mount Lemmon Survey	AGN	1.5 km	MPC · JPL
426738	2013 TW_{77}	—	October 30, 2007	Mount Lemmon	Mount Lemmon Survey	CYB	3.8 km	MPC · JPL
426739	2013 TQ_{78}	—	October 15, 2007	Mount Lemmon	Mount Lemmon Survey	·	2.8 km	MPC · JPL
426740	2013 TG_{79}	—	November 6, 2010	Mount Lemmon	Mount Lemmon Survey	·	640 m	MPC · JPL
426741	2013 TJ_{80}	—	December 25, 2005	Kitt Peak	Spacewatch	(11882)	1.5 km	MPC · JPL
426742	2013 TJ_{83}	—	November 2, 2010	Kitt Peak	Spacewatch	·	690 m	MPC · JPL
426743	2013 TW_{83}	—	November 26, 2005	Kitt Peak	Spacewatch	·	1.7 km	MPC · JPL
426744	2013 TA_{84}	—	February 1, 2006	Mount Lemmon	Mount Lemmon Survey	·	2.1 km	MPC · JPL
426745	2013 TD_{84}	—	January 31, 2006	Kitt Peak	Spacewatch	·	1.7 km	MPC · JPL
426746	2013 TZ_{88}	—	March 10, 2005	Mount Lemmon	Mount Lemmon Survey	·	2.6 km	MPC · JPL
426747	2013 TL_{89}	—	October 10, 2004	Kitt Peak	Spacewatch	·	2.0 km	MPC · JPL
426748	2013 TW_{89}	—	January 23, 2006	Kitt Peak	Spacewatch	·	2.3 km	MPC · JPL
426749	2013 TN_{90}	—	November 9, 2007	Kitt Peak	Spacewatch	·	750 m	MPC · JPL
426750	2013 TB_{92}	—	September 15, 2013	Mount Lemmon	Mount Lemmon Survey	THM	2.1 km	MPC · JPL
426751	2013 TC_{92}	—	October 16, 2009	Catalina	CSS	·	2.3 km	MPC · JPL
426752	2013 TE_{92}	—	October 5, 2004	Kitt Peak	Spacewatch	·	1.5 km	MPC · JPL
426753	2013 TN_{92}	—	September 15, 2004	Kitt Peak	Spacewatch	·	2.1 km	MPC · JPL
426754	2013 TE_{93}	—	March 29, 2011	Kitt Peak	Spacewatch	·	2.3 km	MPC · JPL
426755	2013 TA_{94}	—	September 12, 2007	Mount Lemmon	Mount Lemmon Survey	·	2.9 km	MPC · JPL
426756	2013 TC_{94}	—	December 16, 2009	Mount Lemmon	Mount Lemmon Survey	·	2.3 km	MPC · JPL
426757	2013 TF_{94}	—	May 8, 2005	Mount Lemmon	Mount Lemmon Survey	·	3.9 km	MPC · JPL
426758	2013 TP_{94}	—	January 27, 2007	Kitt Peak	Spacewatch	·	1.6 km	MPC · JPL
426759	2013 TU_{98}	—	February 9, 2010	Kitt Peak	Spacewatch	·	2.6 km	MPC · JPL
426760	2013 TP_{99}	—	September 8, 2000	Kitt Peak	Spacewatch	·	810 m	MPC · JPL
426761	2013 TQ_{99}	—	March 29, 2004	Kitt Peak	Spacewatch	·	3.4 km	MPC · JPL
426762	2013 TR_{99}	—	March 16, 2010	Mount Lemmon	Mount Lemmon Survey	CYB	3.8 km	MPC · JPL
426763	2013 TZ_{99}	—	February 13, 2010	Catalina	CSS	·	2.3 km	MPC · JPL
426764	2013 TB_{100}	—	September 19, 2007	Kitt Peak	Spacewatch	·	3.3 km	MPC · JPL
426765	2013 TC_{101}	—	February 26, 2012	Kitt Peak	Spacewatch	·	730 m	MPC · JPL
426766	2013 TM_{102}	—	September 30, 2005	Mount Lemmon	Mount Lemmon Survey	·	1.1 km	MPC · JPL
426767	2013 TG_{104}	—	August 21, 2008	Kitt Peak	Spacewatch	·	1.8 km	MPC · JPL
426768	2013 TP_{104}	—	September 3, 2008	Kitt Peak	Spacewatch	·	2.5 km	MPC · JPL
426769	2013 TS_{104}	—	October 15, 2007	Mount Lemmon	Mount Lemmon Survey	·	3.0 km	MPC · JPL
426770	2013 TO_{105}	—	November 9, 2009	Kitt Peak	Spacewatch	EUN	1.2 km	MPC · JPL
426771	2013 TE_{107}	—	November 1, 2005	Mount Lemmon	Mount Lemmon Survey	·	1.1 km	MPC · JPL
426772	2013 TS_{107}	—	September 7, 2008	Mount Lemmon	Mount Lemmon Survey	HOF	2.7 km	MPC · JPL
426773	2013 TW_{107}	—	September 7, 2008	Mount Lemmon	Mount Lemmon Survey	·	1.9 km	MPC · JPL
426774	2013 TA_{108}	—	September 30, 2003	Kitt Peak	Spacewatch	KOR	1.6 km	MPC · JPL
426775	2013 TF_{112}	—	October 14, 2004	Kitt Peak	Spacewatch	·	2.3 km	MPC · JPL
426776	2013 TG_{112}	—	September 23, 1998	Kitt Peak	Spacewatch	·	1.5 km	MPC · JPL
426777	2013 TH_{112}	—	September 30, 2008	Mount Lemmon	Mount Lemmon Survey	·	4.6 km	MPC · JPL
426778	2013 TL_{113}	—	October 26, 2005	Kitt Peak	Spacewatch	·	1.5 km	MPC · JPL
426779	2013 TG_{114}	—	October 20, 1995	Kitt Peak	Spacewatch	·	1.9 km	MPC · JPL
426780	2013 TW_{114}	—	April 11, 2012	Mount Lemmon	Mount Lemmon Survey	·	1.7 km	MPC · JPL
426781	2013 TG_{115}	—	April 17, 2005	Kitt Peak	Spacewatch	·	2.9 km	MPC · JPL
426782	2013 TP_{116}	—	February 7, 2006	Kitt Peak	Spacewatch	NEM	2.6 km	MPC · JPL
426783	2013 TL_{120}	—	September 18, 2006	Catalina	CSS	·	700 m	MPC · JPL
426784	2013 TR_{120}	—	August 27, 2001	Kitt Peak	Spacewatch	·	2.3 km	MPC · JPL
426785	2013 TZ_{123}	—	September 22, 2004	Kitt Peak	Spacewatch	MRX	990 m	MPC · JPL
426786	2013 TC_{125}	—	September 8, 1999	Kitt Peak	Spacewatch	SYL · CYB	3.8 km	MPC · JPL
426787	2013 TY_{127}	—	April 29, 2010	WISE	WISE	·	3.7 km	MPC · JPL
426788	2013 TQ_{128}	—	April 26, 2006	Kitt Peak	Spacewatch	·	3.3 km	MPC · JPL
426789	2013 TR_{128}	—	February 2, 2005	Kitt Peak	Spacewatch	·	1.9 km	MPC · JPL
426790	2013 TA_{130}	—	September 12, 2001	Socorro	LINEAR	·	3.4 km	MPC · JPL
426791	2013 TF_{130}	—	October 12, 2007	Mount Lemmon	Mount Lemmon Survey	·	4.1 km	MPC · JPL
426792	2013 TQ_{131}	—	September 30, 1997	Kitt Peak	Spacewatch	·	3.0 km	MPC · JPL
426793	2013 TR_{131}	—	October 28, 2005	Catalina	CSS	·	1.1 km	MPC · JPL
426794	2013 TT_{131}	—	March 6, 2008	Mount Lemmon	Mount Lemmon Survey	·	1.3 km	MPC · JPL
426795	2013 TG_{133}	—	March 14, 2010	Mount Lemmon	Mount Lemmon Survey	·	3.0 km	MPC · JPL
426796	2013 TK_{133}	—	September 18, 2007	Catalina	CSS	·	4.0 km	MPC · JPL
426797	2013 TM_{133}	—	November 20, 2009	Mount Lemmon	Mount Lemmon Survey	·	2.2 km	MPC · JPL
426798	2013 TX_{133}	—	November 6, 2008	Mount Lemmon	Mount Lemmon Survey	·	2.3 km	MPC · JPL
426799	2013 TD_{134}	—	March 30, 2000	Kitt Peak	Spacewatch	·	2.8 km	MPC · JPL
426800	2013 TH_{134}	—	May 4, 2010	WISE	WISE	·	2.0 km	MPC · JPL

== 426801–426900 ==
back to top

Designation			Discovery			Properties		Ref
Permanent	Provisional	Named after	Date	Site	Discoverer(s)	Category	Diam.	Ref
426801	2013 TA_{135}	—	December 9, 2006	Kitt Peak	Spacewatch	·	1.1 km	MPC · JPL
426802	2013 TJ_{136}	—	September 11, 2007	Kitt Peak	Spacewatch	·	2.9 km	MPC · JPL
426803	2013 TO_{136}	—	September 10, 2008	Siding Spring	SSS	·	3.3 km	MPC · JPL
426804	2013 TP_{136}	—	December 24, 1998	Kitt Peak	Spacewatch	·	2.2 km	MPC · JPL
426805	2013 TD_{137}	—	November 1, 2008	Mount Lemmon	Mount Lemmon Survey	HYG	2.9 km	MPC · JPL
426806	2013 TO_{137}	—	September 11, 2007	Mount Lemmon	Mount Lemmon Survey	·	2.7 km	MPC · JPL
426807	2013 TT_{137}	—	March 26, 2010	WISE	WISE	HOF	2.9 km	MPC · JPL
426808	2013 TK_{138}	—	March 1, 2011	Mount Lemmon	Mount Lemmon Survey	AGN	1.1 km	MPC · JPL
426809	2013 TP_{138}	—	November 19, 2000	Kitt Peak	Spacewatch	·	2.8 km	MPC · JPL
426810	2013 TD_{139}	—	February 23, 2007	Kitt Peak	Spacewatch	·	1.4 km	MPC · JPL
426811	2013 TH_{140}	—	April 15, 2007	Kitt Peak	Spacewatch	·	1.9 km	MPC · JPL
426812	2013 TR_{140}	—	September 14, 2007	Kitt Peak	Spacewatch	·	2.9 km	MPC · JPL
426813	2013 TZ_{140}	—	September 19, 2008	Kitt Peak	Spacewatch	KOR	1.5 km	MPC · JPL
426814	2013 TF_{141}	—	October 7, 2005	Kitt Peak	Spacewatch	·	1.2 km	MPC · JPL
426815	2013 TW_{141}	—	March 31, 2009	Kitt Peak	Spacewatch	·	720 m	MPC · JPL
426816	2013 TO_{144}	—	October 7, 2005	Mount Lemmon	Mount Lemmon Survey	·	2.0 km	MPC · JPL
426817	2013 TT_{145}	—	September 24, 2000	Socorro	LINEAR	·	890 m	MPC · JPL
426818	2013 TU_{145}	—	August 22, 2004	Siding Spring	SSS	·	1.4 km	MPC · JPL
426819	2013 TU_{156}	—	September 11, 2007	Mount Lemmon	Mount Lemmon Survey	·	2.5 km	MPC · JPL
426820	2013 UU_{5}	—	December 10, 2004	Socorro	LINEAR	·	3.1 km	MPC · JPL
426821	2013 UJ_{6}	—	October 24, 2009	Kitt Peak	Spacewatch	·	1.6 km	MPC · JPL
426822	2013 UT_{6}	—	August 18, 2007	XuYi	PMO NEO Survey Program	·	3.9 km	MPC · JPL
426823	2013 UD_{7}	—	November 28, 2005	Kitt Peak	Spacewatch	·	1.7 km	MPC · JPL
426824	2013 UQ_{7}	—	March 25, 2007	Mount Lemmon	Mount Lemmon Survey	·	2.4 km	MPC · JPL
426825	2013 UY_{7}	—	August 24, 2007	Kitt Peak	Spacewatch	·	2.9 km	MPC · JPL
426826	2013 UH_{8}	—	November 3, 2005	Mount Lemmon	Mount Lemmon Survey	·	1.7 km	MPC · JPL
426827	2013 UG_{14}	—	August 26, 2000	Socorro	LINEAR	·	1.6 km	MPC · JPL
426828	2013 UQ_{14}	—	January 9, 2006	Kitt Peak	Spacewatch	·	1.8 km	MPC · JPL
426829	2013 VZ	—	October 29, 2003	Kitt Peak	Spacewatch	·	910 m	MPC · JPL
426830	2013 VD_{1}	—	June 23, 2010	WISE	WISE	·	3.0 km	MPC · JPL
426831	2013 VP_{2}	—	October 24, 2009	Catalina	CSS	·	1.7 km	MPC · JPL
426832	2013 VV_{2}	—	October 7, 2007	Catalina	CSS	·	4.0 km	MPC · JPL
426833	2013 VX_{2}	—	October 8, 2007	Catalina	CSS	·	3.8 km	MPC · JPL
426834	2013 VG_{3}	—	June 11, 2010	WISE	WISE	·	3.4 km	MPC · JPL
426835	2013 VM_{3}	—	November 21, 2008	Kitt Peak	Spacewatch	·	2.9 km	MPC · JPL
426836	2013 VD_{7}	—	February 13, 2010	Kitt Peak	Spacewatch	EOS	2.2 km	MPC · JPL
426837	2013 VL_{7}	—	September 10, 2007	Mount Lemmon	Mount Lemmon Survey	EOS	2.2 km	MPC · JPL
426838	2013 VQ_{7}	—	November 10, 2004	Kitt Peak	Spacewatch	HOF	2.7 km	MPC · JPL
426839	2013 VC_{8}	—	March 10, 2005	Anderson Mesa	LONEOS	EOS	2.1 km	MPC · JPL
426840	2013 VM_{8}	—	August 24, 2007	Kitt Peak	Spacewatch	·	2.2 km	MPC · JPL
426841	2013 VV_{9}	—	April 2, 2006	Mount Lemmon	Mount Lemmon Survey	·	2.8 km	MPC · JPL
426842	2013 VJ_{10}	—	May 13, 2008	Mount Lemmon	Mount Lemmon Survey	·	1.2 km	MPC · JPL
426843	2013 VP_{10}	—	October 26, 2009	Kitt Peak	Spacewatch	·	1.3 km	MPC · JPL
426844	2013 VV_{11}	—	November 10, 2001	Socorro	LINEAR	·	1.3 km	MPC · JPL
426845	2013 VH_{14}	—	October 11, 2007	Mount Lemmon	Mount Lemmon Survey	·	3.9 km	MPC · JPL
426846	2013 VG_{15}	—	July 30, 2008	Mount Lemmon	Mount Lemmon Survey	·	1.6 km	MPC · JPL
426847	2013 VF_{16}	—	December 11, 2009	Mount Lemmon	Mount Lemmon Survey	RAF	1.1 km	MPC · JPL
426848	2013 VF_{19}	—	February 12, 2004	Kitt Peak	Spacewatch	·	2.6 km	MPC · JPL
426849	2013 VR_{20}	—	April 7, 2011	Kitt Peak	Spacewatch	·	3.0 km	MPC · JPL
426850	2013 VB_{21}	—	August 4, 2008	Siding Spring	SSS	·	2.4 km	MPC · JPL
426851	2013 VQ_{22}	—	September 13, 2007	Kitt Peak	Spacewatch	·	3.4 km	MPC · JPL
426852	2013 VX_{22}	—	December 1, 2003	Socorro	LINEAR	·	2.3 km	MPC · JPL
426853	2013 VB_{23}	—	October 24, 2008	Kitt Peak	Spacewatch	·	2.5 km	MPC · JPL
426854	2013 WJ_{1}	—	October 26, 2008	Mount Lemmon	Mount Lemmon Survey	·	2.0 km	MPC · JPL
426855	2013 WL_{1}	—	December 21, 2003	Kitt Peak	Spacewatch	·	4.3 km	MPC · JPL
426856	2013 WV_{2}	—	September 13, 2007	Catalina	CSS	·	3.4 km	MPC · JPL
426857	2013 WH_{3}	—	September 3, 2007	Mount Lemmon	Mount Lemmon Survey	·	3.1 km	MPC · JPL
426858	2013 WJ_{4}	—	November 8, 1996	Kitt Peak	Spacewatch	·	2.8 km	MPC · JPL
426859	2013 WP_{4}	—	May 4, 2005	Mount Lemmon	Mount Lemmon Survey	·	4.1 km	MPC · JPL
426860	2013 WX_{4}	—	November 6, 1999	Socorro	LINEAR	·	3.2 km	MPC · JPL
426861	2013 WG_{5}	—	September 10, 2007	Kitt Peak	Spacewatch	·	2.9 km	MPC · JPL
426862	2013 WJ_{5}	—	June 8, 2011	Mount Lemmon	Mount Lemmon Survey	EOS	2.4 km	MPC · JPL
426863	2013 WZ_{5}	—	February 2, 2009	Mount Lemmon	Mount Lemmon Survey	VER	3.0 km	MPC · JPL
426864	2013 WK_{6}	—	December 12, 2004	Kitt Peak	Spacewatch	·	2.8 km	MPC · JPL
426865	2013 WA_{7}	—	November 2, 2008	Mount Lemmon	Mount Lemmon Survey	·	3.3 km	MPC · JPL
426866	2013 WC_{7}	—	December 26, 2005	Kitt Peak	Spacewatch	·	1.5 km	MPC · JPL
426867	2013 WU_{8}	—	October 16, 2007	Mount Lemmon	Mount Lemmon Survey	·	4.3 km	MPC · JPL
426868	2013 WL_{15}	—	December 25, 2005	Mount Lemmon	Mount Lemmon Survey	·	1.4 km	MPC · JPL
426869	2013 WQ_{19}	—	May 9, 2005	Kitt Peak	Spacewatch	·	3.8 km	MPC · JPL
426870	2013 WJ_{21}	—	December 31, 2008	Mount Lemmon	Mount Lemmon Survey	EOS	2.3 km	MPC · JPL
426871	2013 WQ_{21}	—	January 14, 2011	Mount Lemmon	Mount Lemmon Survey	·	2.6 km	MPC · JPL
426872	2013 WK_{27}	—	June 14, 2007	Kitt Peak	Spacewatch	·	3.7 km	MPC · JPL
426873	2013 WH_{28}	—	December 11, 2004	Campo Imperatore	CINEOS	·	2.2 km	MPC · JPL
426874	2013 WS_{29}	—	October 21, 1995	Kitt Peak	Spacewatch	·	1.7 km	MPC · JPL
426875	2013 WJ_{34}	—	October 5, 2004	Kitt Peak	Spacewatch	·	1.4 km	MPC · JPL
426876	2013 WS_{35}	—	December 27, 2006	Mount Lemmon	Mount Lemmon Survey	·	1.7 km	MPC · JPL
426877	2013 WB_{37}	—	December 21, 2008	Mount Lemmon	Mount Lemmon Survey	·	3.0 km	MPC · JPL
426878	2013 WR_{37}	—	January 5, 2003	Socorro	LINEAR	·	3.6 km	MPC · JPL
426879	2013 WP_{39}	—	September 22, 2006	Catalina	CSS	(45637) · CYB	4.0 km	MPC · JPL
426880	2013 WG_{42}	—	September 7, 2008	Mount Lemmon	Mount Lemmon Survey	·	1.9 km	MPC · JPL
426881	2013 WW_{46}	—	April 18, 2005	Kitt Peak	Spacewatch	·	3.8 km	MPC · JPL
426882	2013 WR_{47}	—	January 26, 2006	Kitt Peak	Spacewatch	AGN	1.6 km	MPC · JPL
426883	2013 WL_{48}	—	September 14, 1998	Socorro	LINEAR	·	1.6 km	MPC · JPL
426884	2013 WT_{49}	—	February 17, 2010	Mount Lemmon	Mount Lemmon Survey	EOS	2.2 km	MPC · JPL
426885	2013 WD_{50}	—	June 29, 2008	Siding Spring	SSS	·	1.8 km	MPC · JPL
426886	2013 WZ_{50}	—	February 22, 2004	Kitt Peak	Spacewatch	·	2.9 km	MPC · JPL
426887	2013 WA_{51}	—	September 19, 2001	Socorro	LINEAR	·	3.6 km	MPC · JPL
426888	2013 WZ_{52}	—	September 3, 2007	Catalina	CSS	·	3.5 km	MPC · JPL
426889	2013 WG_{53}	—	December 31, 2008	Kitt Peak	Spacewatch	·	3.3 km	MPC · JPL
426890	2013 WS_{56}	—	December 13, 1999	Kitt Peak	Spacewatch	·	2.9 km	MPC · JPL
426891	2013 WX_{56}	—	March 19, 2010	Mount Lemmon	Mount Lemmon Survey	·	3.8 km	MPC · JPL
426892	2013 WL_{57}	—	August 5, 2008	Siding Spring	SSS	·	2.3 km	MPC · JPL
426893	2013 WX_{57}	—	December 8, 1999	Kitt Peak	Spacewatch	·	2.4 km	MPC · JPL
426894	2013 WR_{58}	—	November 21, 2009	Mount Lemmon	Mount Lemmon Survey	WIT	1 km	MPC · JPL
426895	2013 WT_{58}	—	March 18, 2010	WISE	WISE	·	2.1 km	MPC · JPL
426896	2013 WU_{58}	—	January 22, 2006	Mount Lemmon	Mount Lemmon Survey	·	1.7 km	MPC · JPL
426897	2013 WT_{59}	—	January 6, 2010	Mount Lemmon	Mount Lemmon Survey	·	2.2 km	MPC · JPL
426898	2013 WC_{62}	—	November 1, 2013	Kitt Peak	Spacewatch	·	2.6 km	MPC · JPL
426899	2013 WJ_{62}	—	November 2, 2007	Catalina	CSS	·	3.4 km	MPC · JPL
426900	2013 WZ_{66}	—	December 26, 2005	Mount Lemmon	Mount Lemmon Survey	·	2.3 km	MPC · JPL

== 426901–427000 ==
back to top

Designation			Discovery			Properties		Ref
Permanent	Provisional	Named after	Date	Site	Discoverer(s)	Category	Diam.	Ref
426901	2013 WV_{69}	—	March 10, 2005	Kitt Peak	Spacewatch	·	2.5 km	MPC · JPL
426902	2013 WX_{70}	—	September 12, 2007	Catalina	CSS	·	2.5 km	MPC · JPL
426903	2013 WZ_{72}	—	September 20, 2009	Kitt Peak	Spacewatch	·	1.4 km	MPC · JPL
426904	2013 WH_{74}	—	January 20, 2009	Kitt Peak	Spacewatch	·	2.5 km	MPC · JPL
426905	2013 WM_{74}	—	December 1, 1996	Kitt Peak	Spacewatch	·	3.3 km	MPC · JPL
426906	2013 WK_{75}	—	February 13, 2010	Mount Lemmon	Mount Lemmon Survey	·	1.9 km	MPC · JPL
426907	2013 WZ_{75}	—	October 9, 2002	Kitt Peak	Spacewatch	·	2.0 km	MPC · JPL
426908	2013 WZ_{76}	—	September 2, 2008	Kitt Peak	Spacewatch	EOS	2.5 km	MPC · JPL
426909	2013 WM_{78}	—	March 31, 2005	Anderson Mesa	LONEOS	·	970 m	MPC · JPL
426910	2013 WY_{80}	—	January 2, 2009	Kitt Peak	Spacewatch	·	2.4 km	MPC · JPL
426911	2013 WA_{81}	—	October 20, 2006	Mount Lemmon	Mount Lemmon Survey	(2076)	1.0 km	MPC · JPL
426912	2013 WA_{83}	—	November 19, 2008	Kitt Peak	Spacewatch	TEL	1.5 km	MPC · JPL
426913	2013 WM_{84}	—	April 30, 2006	Kitt Peak	Spacewatch	·	2.4 km	MPC · JPL
426914	2013 WK_{85}	—	May 3, 2005	Kitt Peak	Spacewatch	·	4.2 km	MPC · JPL
426915	2013 WO_{86}	—	December 1, 2008	Mount Lemmon	Mount Lemmon Survey	EOS	2.0 km	MPC · JPL
426916	2013 WT_{91}	—	May 2, 2006	Mount Lemmon	Mount Lemmon Survey	KOR	1.4 km	MPC · JPL
426917	2013 WH_{94}	—	October 12, 2007	Mount Lemmon	Mount Lemmon Survey	·	2.9 km	MPC · JPL
426918	2013 WF_{97}	—	March 24, 2006	Kitt Peak	Spacewatch	·	1.3 km	MPC · JPL
426919	2013 WH_{97}	—	December 5, 2002	Socorro	LINEAR	·	2.9 km	MPC · JPL
426920	2013 WZ_{98}	—	December 13, 2004	Kitt Peak	Spacewatch	HOF	2.7 km	MPC · JPL
426921	2013 WP_{99}	—	September 11, 2007	Mount Lemmon	Mount Lemmon Survey	·	2.8 km	MPC · JPL
426922	2013 WY_{102}	—	September 29, 2008	Kitt Peak	Spacewatch	·	2.5 km	MPC · JPL
426923	2013 WL_{107}	—	November 9, 2009	Mount Lemmon	Mount Lemmon Survey	·	2.0 km	MPC · JPL
426924	2013 WM_{107}	—	December 1, 2005	Mount Lemmon	Mount Lemmon Survey	·	1.8 km	MPC · JPL
426925	2013 WG_{109}	—	September 25, 2007	Mount Lemmon	Mount Lemmon Survey	·	3.4 km	MPC · JPL
426926	2013 XG_{1}	—	December 5, 2005	Kitt Peak	Spacewatch	·	1.6 km	MPC · JPL
426927	2013 XR_{1}	—	November 27, 2009	Mount Lemmon	Mount Lemmon Survey	·	3.7 km	MPC · JPL
426928	2013 XB_{9}	—	April 25, 2010	WISE	WISE	·	2.3 km	MPC · JPL
426929	2013 XF_{9}	—	April 1, 2005	Kitt Peak	Spacewatch	·	2.7 km	MPC · JPL
426930	2013 XT_{10}	—	February 2, 2006	Kitt Peak	Spacewatch	WIT	1.1 km	MPC · JPL
426931	2013 XE_{11}	—	December 5, 2002	Kitt Peak	Spacewatch	·	4.5 km	MPC · JPL
426932	2013 XL_{11}	—	November 4, 2002	Kitt Peak	Spacewatch	·	3.0 km	MPC · JPL
426933	2013 XF_{12}	—	September 23, 2008	Mount Lemmon	Mount Lemmon Survey	MRX	1.1 km	MPC · JPL
426934	2013 XW_{13}	—	October 8, 2007	Catalina	CSS	EOS	2.1 km	MPC · JPL
426935	2013 XH_{15}	—	March 25, 2007	Mount Lemmon	Mount Lemmon Survey	ADE	3.2 km	MPC · JPL
426936	2013 XS_{18}	—	December 6, 2005	Kitt Peak	Spacewatch	·	1.4 km	MPC · JPL
426937	2013 XT_{24}	—	June 5, 1999	Kitt Peak	Spacewatch	·	1.7 km	MPC · JPL
426938	2013 YL	—	March 6, 2003	Socorro	LINEAR	T_{j} (2.98)	4.6 km	MPC · JPL
426939	2013 YW_{3}	—	March 17, 2005	Campo Imperatore	CINEOS	·	2.8 km	MPC · JPL
426940	2013 YG_{5}	—	December 31, 2008	Mount Lemmon	Mount Lemmon Survey	·	4.5 km	MPC · JPL
426941	2013 YA_{6}	—	November 24, 2003	Kitt Peak	Spacewatch	AGN	1.6 km	MPC · JPL
426942	2013 YF_{8}	—	March 16, 2004	Siding Spring	SSS	·	3.7 km	MPC · JPL
426943	2013 YS_{16}	—	June 5, 2005	Kitt Peak	Spacewatch	·	3.8 km	MPC · JPL
426944	2013 YA_{18}	—	February 4, 2009	Mount Lemmon	Mount Lemmon Survey	·	3.1 km	MPC · JPL
426945	2013 YJ_{19}	—	March 11, 2007	Kitt Peak	Spacewatch	·	1.5 km	MPC · JPL
426946	2013 YN_{20}	—	October 3, 1999	Socorro	LINEAR	·	2.7 km	MPC · JPL
426947	2013 YB_{22}	—	February 25, 2011	Kitt Peak	Spacewatch	·	2.2 km	MPC · JPL
426948	2013 YG_{22}	—	December 7, 1996	Kitt Peak	Spacewatch	VER	2.6 km	MPC · JPL
426949	2013 YY_{23}	—	December 2, 2008	Kitt Peak	Spacewatch	·	2.9 km	MPC · JPL
426950	2013 YR_{24}	—	December 15, 2009	Mount Lemmon	Mount Lemmon Survey	·	1.8 km	MPC · JPL
426951	2013 YD_{25}	—	May 8, 2005	Mount Lemmon	Mount Lemmon Survey	HYG	3.5 km	MPC · JPL
426952	2013 YT_{25}	—	June 26, 2010	WISE	WISE	·	2.1 km	MPC · JPL
426953	2013 YF_{26}	—	September 14, 2007	Mount Lemmon	Mount Lemmon Survey	·	3.1 km	MPC · JPL
426954	2013 YH_{26}	—	October 17, 2007	Mount Lemmon	Mount Lemmon Survey	·	3.4 km	MPC · JPL
426955	2013 YL_{26}	—	October 30, 2007	Kitt Peak	Spacewatch	·	3.3 km	MPC · JPL
426956	2013 YC_{27}	—	October 6, 2008	Mount Lemmon	Mount Lemmon Survey	·	1.8 km	MPC · JPL
426957	2013 YB_{28}	—	November 23, 2008	Kitt Peak	Spacewatch	·	3.2 km	MPC · JPL
426958	2013 YB_{37}	—	November 8, 2007	Mount Lemmon	Mount Lemmon Survey	ELF	3.3 km	MPC · JPL
426959	2013 YB_{45}	—	March 10, 2005	Catalina	CSS	·	3.4 km	MPC · JPL
426960	2013 YL_{52}	—	September 30, 1995	Kitt Peak	Spacewatch	·	1.6 km	MPC · JPL
426961	2013 YJ_{56}	—	August 29, 2006	Kitt Peak	Spacewatch	·	2.9 km	MPC · JPL
426962	2013 YL_{57}	—	September 16, 2012	Kitt Peak	Spacewatch	·	2.6 km	MPC · JPL
426963	2013 YY_{59}	—	December 29, 2008	Kitt Peak	Spacewatch	·	2.1 km	MPC · JPL
426964	2013 YD_{60}	—	September 15, 2006	Kitt Peak	Spacewatch	·	2.9 km	MPC · JPL
426965	2013 YS_{70}	—	December 2, 2008	Mount Lemmon	Mount Lemmon Survey	·	2.6 km	MPC · JPL
426966	2013 YV_{71}	—	August 22, 2004	Siding Spring	SSS	·	1.4 km	MPC · JPL
426967	2013 YB_{82}	—	January 2, 2009	Kitt Peak	Spacewatch	·	1.8 km	MPC · JPL
426968	2013 YW_{103}	—	September 26, 1998	Socorro	LINEAR	NYS	1.5 km	MPC · JPL
426969	2013 YM_{112}	—	February 21, 2009	Catalina	CSS	·	4.2 km	MPC · JPL
426970	2013 YL_{114}	—	January 20, 2009	Kitt Peak	Spacewatch	KOR	1.6 km	MPC · JPL
426971	2013 YA_{119}	—	November 9, 2007	Catalina	CSS	·	3.1 km	MPC · JPL
426972	2013 YO_{124}	—	January 11, 2008	Kitt Peak	Spacewatch	·	3.2 km	MPC · JPL
426973	2013 YP_{125}	—	September 27, 2006	Kitt Peak	Spacewatch	·	2.5 km	MPC · JPL
426974	2013 YH_{133}	—	June 23, 2010	WISE	WISE	NAE	2.8 km	MPC · JPL
426975	2013 YF_{138}	—	October 8, 2007	Mount Lemmon	Mount Lemmon Survey	EOS	1.8 km	MPC · JPL
426976	2013 YK_{141}	—	June 27, 2005	Kitt Peak	Spacewatch	·	4.1 km	MPC · JPL
426977	2013 YX_{143}	—	April 12, 2004	Kitt Peak	Spacewatch	THM	2.2 km	MPC · JPL
426978	2014 AO_{7}	—	August 29, 2006	Kitt Peak	Spacewatch	·	2.6 km	MPC · JPL
426979	2014 AU_{11}	—	September 18, 2003	Socorro	LINEAR	·	2.6 km	MPC · JPL
426980	2014 AH_{37}	—	June 19, 2006	Mount Lemmon	Mount Lemmon Survey	·	2.9 km	MPC · JPL
426981	2014 AO_{37}	—	December 19, 2007	Mount Lemmon	Mount Lemmon Survey	·	4.8 km	MPC · JPL
426982	2014 AX_{48}	—	February 13, 2009	Kitt Peak	Spacewatch	·	3.6 km	MPC · JPL
426983	2014 AU_{54}	—	May 11, 2005	Kitt Peak	Spacewatch	·	3.1 km	MPC · JPL
426984	2014 BB_{11}	—	August 21, 2006	Kitt Peak	Spacewatch	·	2.0 km	MPC · JPL
426985	2014 BO_{16}	—	November 19, 2007	Kitt Peak	Spacewatch	CYB	4.1 km	MPC · JPL
426986	2014 BV_{17}	—	February 12, 2004	Kitt Peak	Spacewatch	·	2.5 km	MPC · JPL
426987	2014 BE_{22}	—	April 19, 2004	Kitt Peak	Spacewatch	VER	3.7 km	MPC · JPL
426988	2014 BA_{44}	—	December 31, 2008	Mount Lemmon	Mount Lemmon Survey	TEL	1.6 km	MPC · JPL
426989	2014 BL_{55}	—	November 26, 2003	Kitt Peak	Spacewatch	·	2.1 km	MPC · JPL
426990	2014 DS_{7}	—	April 11, 2010	Mount Lemmon	Mount Lemmon Survey	EOS	2.2 km	MPC · JPL
426991	2014 DT_{29}	—	February 20, 2009	Kitt Peak	Spacewatch	·	3.1 km	MPC · JPL
426992	2014 DQ_{67}	—	April 24, 2003	Kitt Peak	Spacewatch	L4 · ERY	8.1 km	MPC · JPL
426993	2014 DX_{123}	—	March 9, 2002	Kitt Peak	Spacewatch	L4	8.2 km	MPC · JPL
426994	2014 HS_{131}	—	March 8, 2009	Mount Lemmon	Mount Lemmon Survey	EOS	2.5 km	MPC · JPL
426995	2014 OO_{298}	—	December 31, 2007	Mount Lemmon	Mount Lemmon Survey	NYS	1.1 km	MPC · JPL
426996	2014 PB_{68}	—	November 20, 2001	Socorro	LINEAR	·	2.4 km	MPC · JPL
426997	2014 QD_{30}	—	August 26, 2009	Catalina	CSS	·	1.8 km	MPC · JPL
426998	2014 QA_{167}	—	March 25, 2007	Mount Lemmon	Mount Lemmon Survey	EOS	2.2 km	MPC · JPL
426999	2014 QR_{330}	—	May 14, 2008	Mount Lemmon	Mount Lemmon Survey	·	2.1 km	MPC · JPL
427000	2014 QN_{368}	—	December 13, 2006	Catalina	CSS	·	1.4 km	MPC · JPL

back to top

== Meaning of names ==
As minor planet discoveries are confirmed, they are given a permanent number by the IAU's Minor Planet Center (MPC), and the discoverers can then submit names for them, following the IAU's naming conventions. The list below concerns those minor planets in the specified number-range that have received names, and explains the meanings of those names.

Official naming citations of newly named small Solar System bodies are approved and published in a bulletin by IAU's Working Group for Small Bodies Nomenclature (WGSBN). Before May 2021, citations were published in MPC's Minor Planet Circulars for many decades. Recent citations can also be found on the JPL Small-Body Database (SBDB). Until his death in 2016, German astronomer Lutz D. Schmadel compiled these citations into the Dictionary of Minor Planet Names (DMP) and regularly updated the collection.

Based on Paul Herget's The Names of the Minor Planets, Schmadel also researched the unclear origin of numerous asteroids, most of which had been named prior to World War II. This article incorporates text from this source, which is in the public domain: SBDB New namings may only be added to this list below after official publication as the preannouncement of names is condemned. The WGSBN publishes a comprehensive guideline for the naming rules of non-cometary small Solar System bodies.

Named minor planet	Provisional	This minor planet was named for...	Ref · Catalog
426524 Rainerhannig	2013 RH_{52}	Rainer Hannig, German Egyptologist.	IAU · 426524
