= List of minor planets: 837001–838000 =

The following is a partial list of minor planets, running from minor-planet number 837001 through 838000, inclusive. The primary data for this and other partial lists is based on JPL's "Small-Body Orbital Elements" and data available from the Minor Planet Center. Critical list information is also provided by the MPC, unless otherwise specified from Lowell Observatory. A detailed description of the table's columns and additional sources are given on the main page including a complete list of every page in this series, and a statistical break-up on the dynamical classification of minor planets.

Also see the summary list of all named bodies in numerical and alphabetical order, and the corresponding naming citations for the number range of this particular list. New namings may only be added to this list after official publication, as the preannouncement of names is condemned by the Working Group for Small Bodies Nomenclature of the International Astronomical Union.

Near-Earth obj.	MBA (inner)	MBA (outer)	Centaur
Mars-crosser	MBA (middle)	Jupiter trojan	Trans-Neptunian obj.
Unclassified

== 837001–837100 ==
Designation			Discovery			Properties		Ref
Permanent	Provisional	Named after	Date	Site	Discoverer(s)	Category	Diam.	Ref
837001	2012 XF_{130}	—	December 5, 2012	Mount Lemmon	Mount Lemmon Survey	·	800 m	MPC · JPL
837002	2012 XR_{131}	—	December 12, 2012	Mount Lemmon	Mount Lemmon Survey	·	1.3 km	MPC · JPL
837003	2012 XD_{136}	—	December 3, 1997	Chichibu	N. Satō	·	3.4 km	MPC · JPL
837004	2012 XL_{136}	—	August 17, 2001	Palomar Mountain	NEAT	H	620 m	MPC · JPL
837005	2012 XE_{137}	—	December 4, 2012	Mount Lemmon	Mount Lemmon Survey	·	590 m	MPC · JPL
837006	2012 XS_{141}	—	December 3, 2012	Mount Lemmon	Mount Lemmon Survey	·	1.4 km	MPC · JPL
837007	2012 XM_{143}	—	November 7, 2012	Kitt Peak	Spacewatch	AEO	820 m	MPC · JPL
837008	2012 XW_{148}	—	December 4, 2012	Mount Lemmon	Mount Lemmon Survey	·	1.1 km	MPC · JPL
837009	2012 XM_{150}	—	December 7, 2012	Haleakala	Pan-STARRS 1	·	1.2 km	MPC · JPL
837010	2012 XY_{152}	—	December 3, 2012	Mount Lemmon	Mount Lemmon Survey	·	720 m	MPC · JPL
837011	2012 XB_{160}	—	December 11, 2012	Mount Lemmon	Mount Lemmon Survey	·	2.2 km	MPC · JPL
837012	2012 XG_{160}	—	December 4, 2012	Mount Lemmon	Mount Lemmon Survey	·	720 m	MPC · JPL
837013	2012 XF_{161}	—	July 23, 2010	WISE	WISE	·	2.8 km	MPC · JPL
837014	2012 XK_{162}	—	December 5, 2012	Mount Lemmon	Mount Lemmon Survey	(1547)	1.4 km	MPC · JPL
837015	2012 XP_{163}	—	December 11, 2012	Mount Lemmon	Mount Lemmon Survey	·	1.1 km	MPC · JPL
837016	2012 XF_{164}	—	December 13, 2012	Mount Lemmon	Mount Lemmon Survey	EUN	930 m	MPC · JPL
837017	2012 XT_{164}	—	December 3, 2012	Mount Lemmon	Mount Lemmon Survey	·	1.4 km	MPC · JPL
837018	2012 XW_{164}	—	December 9, 2012	Mount Lemmon	Mount Lemmon Survey	H	430 m	MPC · JPL
837019	2012 XH_{165}	—	December 9, 2012	Mount Lemmon	Mount Lemmon Survey	·	1.6 km	MPC · JPL
837020	2012 XP_{165}	—	August 3, 2017	Haleakala	Pan-STARRS 1	·	1.9 km	MPC · JPL
837021	2012 XC_{166}	—	November 25, 2016	Mount Lemmon	Mount Lemmon Survey	·	760 m	MPC · JPL
837022	2012 XY_{169}	—	December 4, 2012	Mount Lemmon	Mount Lemmon Survey	·	800 m	MPC · JPL
837023	2012 XA_{170}	—	September 18, 2001	Sacramento Peak	SDSS	·	1.7 km	MPC · JPL
837024	2012 XL_{173}	—	December 7, 2012	Kitt Peak	Spacewatch	(5)	960 m	MPC · JPL
837025	2012 XE_{174}	—	December 3, 2012	Mount Lemmon	Mount Lemmon Survey	·	670 m	MPC · JPL
837026	2012 XD_{177}	—	December 8, 2012	Mount Lemmon	Mount Lemmon Survey	·	700 m	MPC · JPL
837027	2012 XW_{178}	—	December 9, 2012	Mount Lemmon	Mount Lemmon Survey	HOF	1.6 km	MPC · JPL
837028	2012 YT_{1}	—	December 16, 2012	Oukaïmeden	C. Rinner	·	1.2 km	MPC · JPL
837029	2012 YM_{2}	—	August 2, 2011	La Sagra	OAM	·	2.4 km	MPC · JPL
837030	2012 YA_{5}	—	December 22, 2012	Haleakala	Pan-STARRS 1	·	940 m	MPC · JPL
837031	2012 YE_{5}	—	December 22, 2012	Haleakala	Pan-STARRS 1	·	1.3 km	MPC · JPL
837032	2012 YW_{7}	—	December 31, 2012	Haleakala	Pan-STARRS 1	·	440 m	MPC · JPL
837033	2012 YA_{12}	—	December 16, 2012	ESA OGS	ESA OGS	·	1.3 km	MPC · JPL
837034	2012 YD_{13}	—	August 11, 2016	Haleakala	Pan-STARRS 1	·	2.5 km	MPC · JPL
837035	2012 YF_{13}	—	December 22, 2012	Haleakala	Pan-STARRS 1	·	1.4 km	MPC · JPL
837036	2012 YS_{17}	—	December 22, 2012	Haleakala	Pan-STARRS 1	·	580 m	MPC · JPL
837037	2012 YH_{18}	—	December 23, 2012	Haleakala	Pan-STARRS 1	·	520 m	MPC · JPL
837038	2012 YW_{22}	—	December 21, 2012	Mount Lemmon	Mount Lemmon Survey	EOS	1.6 km	MPC · JPL
837039	2013 AH	—	March 20, 1999	Sacramento Peak	SDSS	·	1.3 km	MPC · JPL
837040	2013 AQ	—	January 1, 2013	Haleakala	Pan-STARRS 1	H	390 m	MPC · JPL
837041	2013 AC_{1}	—	December 25, 2012	Nogales	M. Schwartz, P. R. Holvorcem	·	2.4 km	MPC · JPL
837042	2013 AX_{3}	—	January 3, 2013	Haleakala	Pan-STARRS 1	·	430 m	MPC · JPL
837043	2013 AG_{9}	—	January 3, 2013	Haleakala	Pan-STARRS 1	PHO	1.9 km	MPC · JPL
837044	2013 AK_{9}	—	February 2, 2006	Kitt Peak	Spacewatch	·	830 m	MPC · JPL
837045	2013 AP_{10}	—	December 23, 2012	Haleakala	Pan-STARRS 1	·	1.2 km	MPC · JPL
837046	2013 AA_{16}	—	January 12, 2010	WISE	WISE	L4	10 km	MPC · JPL
837047	2013 AO_{17}	—	May 20, 2010	WISE	WISE	·	3.1 km	MPC · JPL
837048	2013 AE_{25}	—	January 5, 2013	Kitt Peak	Spacewatch	·	1.3 km	MPC · JPL
837049	2013 AS_{31}	—	January 7, 2013	Haleakala	Pan-STARRS 1	·	890 m	MPC · JPL
837050	2013 AG_{34}	—	January 4, 2013	Mount Lemmon	Mount Lemmon Survey	·	840 m	MPC · JPL
837051	2013 AB_{42}	—	January 5, 2013	Kitt Peak	Spacewatch	·	1.5 km	MPC · JPL
837052	2013 AU_{43}	—	August 21, 2001	Haleakala	NEAT	H	570 m	MPC · JPL
837053	2013 AV_{53}	—	December 13, 2012	Mount Lemmon	Mount Lemmon Survey	·	770 m	MPC · JPL
837054	2013 AY_{55}	—	December 8, 2012	Kitt Peak	Spacewatch	·	530 m	MPC · JPL
837055	2013 AT_{69}	—	October 2, 1996	La Silla	E. W. Elst	·	1.7 km	MPC · JPL
837056	2013 AN_{71}	—	October 22, 2006	Siding Spring	SSS	T_{j} (2.98)	3.0 km	MPC · JPL
837057	2013 AC_{76}	—	January 14, 2013	Catalina	CSS	·	1.2 km	MPC · JPL
837058	2013 AP_{76}	—	January 27, 1996	Siding Spring	G. J. Garradd	PHO	1.7 km	MPC · JPL
837059	2013 AF_{82}	—	December 23, 2012	Haleakala	Pan-STARRS 1	·	940 m	MPC · JPL
837060	2013 AZ_{86}	—	July 26, 1998	La Silla	E. W. Elst	·	1.8 km	MPC · JPL
837061	2013 AZ_{92}	—	January 8, 2002	Sacramento Peak	SDSS	·	1.7 km	MPC · JPL
837062	2013 AG_{95}	—	December 8, 2012	Kitt Peak	Spacewatch	·	760 m	MPC · JPL
837063	2013 AH_{99}	—	January 7, 2013	Kitt Peak	Spacewatch	H	380 m	MPC · JPL
837064	2013 AY_{112}	—	March 21, 1999	Sacramento Peak	SDSS	·	1.1 km	MPC · JPL
837065	2013 AX_{114}	—	November 7, 2007	Kitt Peak	Spacewatch	·	1.3 km	MPC · JPL
837066	2013 AK_{125}	—	January 5, 2013	Kitt Peak	Spacewatch	H	400 m	MPC · JPL
837067	2013 AL_{147}	—	January 4, 2013	Cerro Tololo	D. E. Trilling, R. L. Allen	·	1.2 km	MPC · JPL
837068	2013 AK_{154}	—	January 4, 2013	Cerro Tololo	D. E. Trilling, R. L. Allen	·	1.3 km	MPC · JPL
837069	2013 AE_{155}	—	October 23, 2011	Mount Lemmon	Mount Lemmon Survey	·	1.7 km	MPC · JPL
837070	2013 AS_{157}	—	January 4, 2013	Cerro Tololo	D. E. Trilling, R. L. Allen	EOS	1.2 km	MPC · JPL
837071	2013 AJ_{160}	—	October 29, 2002	Sacramento Peak	SDSS	·	1.9 km	MPC · JPL
837072	2013 AR_{161}	—	September 24, 2011	Haleakala	Pan-STARRS 1	·	2.0 km	MPC · JPL
837073	2013 AW_{164}	—	January 11, 2002	Cerro Tololo	Deep Lens Survey	L4	4.5 km	MPC · JPL
837074	2013 AZ_{164}	—	January 20, 2013	Mount Lemmon	Mount Lemmon Survey	·	880 m	MPC · JPL
837075	2013 AX_{168}	—	October 10, 2002	Sacramento Peak	SDSS	·	1.3 km	MPC · JPL
837076	2013 AC_{176}	—	September 12, 2007	Mount Lemmon	Mount Lemmon Survey	EUN	660 m	MPC · JPL
837077	2013 AV_{176}	—	January 5, 2013	Cerro Tololo	D. E. Trilling, R. L. Allen	TIR	2.0 km	MPC · JPL
837078	2013 AX_{177}	—	January 5, 2013	Cerro Tololo	D. E. Trilling, R. L. Allen	·	1.1 km	MPC · JPL
837079	2013 AK_{182}	—	January 5, 2013	Cerro Tololo	D. E. Trilling, R. L. Allen	MAR	680 m	MPC · JPL
837080	2013 AE_{186}	—	January 5, 2013	Kitt Peak	Spacewatch	THM	1.7 km	MPC · JPL
837081	2013 AM_{189}	—	September 19, 2003	Kitt Peak	Spacewatch	·	920 m	MPC · JPL
837082	2013 AN_{189}	—	September 25, 2016	Haleakala	Pan-STARRS 1	·	1.6 km	MPC · JPL
837083	2013 AR_{190}	—	January 5, 2013	Mount Lemmon	Mount Lemmon Survey	JUN	810 m	MPC · JPL
837084	2013 AV_{190}	—	January 5, 2013	Kitt Peak	Spacewatch	·	540 m	MPC · JPL
837085	2013 AZ_{190}	—	January 3, 2013	Haleakala	Pan-STARRS 1	·	2.1 km	MPC · JPL
837086	2013 AC_{194}	—	January 10, 2013	Haleakala	Pan-STARRS 1	·	1.2 km	MPC · JPL
837087	2013 AG_{196}	—	January 6, 2013	Mount Lemmon	Mount Lemmon Survey	·	580 m	MPC · JPL
837088	2013 AF_{197}	—	August 8, 2005	Cerro Tololo	Deep Ecliptic Survey	·	1.7 km	MPC · JPL
837089	2013 AS_{197}	—	January 5, 2013	Mount Lemmon	Mount Lemmon Survey	EUN	940 m	MPC · JPL
837090	2013 AB_{200}	—	January 4, 2013	Kitt Peak	Spacewatch	·	1.9 km	MPC · JPL
837091	2013 AH_{200}	—	January 10, 2013	Haleakala	Pan-STARRS 1	·	700 m	MPC · JPL
837092	2013 AL_{200}	—	January 10, 2013	Haleakala	Pan-STARRS 1	·	1.3 km	MPC · JPL
837093	2013 AG_{206}	—	January 10, 2013	Haleakala	Pan-STARRS 1	·	2.1 km	MPC · JPL
837094	2013 AZ_{208}	—	January 10, 2013	Haleakala	Pan-STARRS 1	·	1.8 km	MPC · JPL
837095	2013 AH_{211}	—	January 10, 2013	Haleakala	Pan-STARRS 1	EOS	1.2 km	MPC · JPL
837096	2013 AN_{223}	—	January 10, 2013	Haleakala	Pan-STARRS 1	·	1.5 km	MPC · JPL
837097	2013 BD_{3}	—	January 4, 2013	Kitt Peak	Spacewatch	·	1.2 km	MPC · JPL
837098	2013 BH_{4}	—	January 16, 2013	Mount Lemmon	Mount Lemmon Survey	·	1.4 km	MPC · JPL
837099	2013 BF_{10}	—	October 29, 2002	Sacramento Peak	SDSS	·	1.5 km	MPC · JPL
837100	2013 BS_{22}	—	January 10, 2013	Haleakala	Pan-STARRS 1	·	1.2 km	MPC · JPL

== 837101–837200 ==
back to top

Designation			Discovery			Properties		Ref
Permanent	Provisional	Named after	Date	Site	Discoverer(s)	Category	Diam.	Ref
837101	2013 BA_{25}	—	January 12, 1996	Mount Ontake	Sato, I.	·	640 m	MPC · JPL
837102	2013 BC_{25}	—	January 3, 2013	Mount Lemmon	Mount Lemmon Survey	·	1.5 km	MPC · JPL
837103	2013 BP_{26}	—	October 17, 2010	Mount Lemmon	Mount Lemmon Survey	L4	7.9 km	MPC · JPL
837104	2013 BR_{57}	—	October 13, 1999	Sacramento Peak	SDSS	·	680 m	MPC · JPL
837105	2013 BJ_{58}	—	May 4, 2000	Sacramento Peak	SDSS	·	2.0 km	MPC · JPL
837106	2013 BM_{58}	—	September 9, 2008	Mount Lemmon	Mount Lemmon Survey	·	480 m	MPC · JPL
837107	2013 BJ_{62}	—	October 18, 1998	La Silla	E. W. Elst	·	810 m	MPC · JPL
837108	2013 BR_{68}	—	December 9, 2012	Mount Lemmon	Mount Lemmon Survey	·	1.9 km	MPC · JPL
837109	2013 BG_{70}	—	January 22, 2013	Haleakala	Pan-STARRS 1	·	920 m	MPC · JPL
837110	2013 BK_{71}	—	December 4, 2007	Kitt Peak	Spacewatch	·	1.7 km	MPC · JPL
837111	2013 BY_{74}	—	November 13, 2007	Mount Lemmon	Mount Lemmon Survey	·	1.5 km	MPC · JPL
837112	2013 BT_{77}	—	January 5, 2013	Kitt Peak	Spacewatch	·	1.0 km	MPC · JPL
837113	2013 BC_{80}	—	January 31, 2013	Mount Lemmon	Mount Lemmon Survey	·	540 m	MPC · JPL
837114	2013 BQ_{85}	—	June 15, 2010	WISE	WISE	·	3.8 km	MPC · JPL
837115	2013 BN_{86}	—	January 18, 2013	Haleakala	Pan-STARRS 1	·	750 m	MPC · JPL
837116	2013 BS_{86}	—	April 8, 2010	WISE	WISE	·	3.2 km	MPC · JPL
837117	2013 BY_{86}	—	May 29, 2010	WISE	WISE	·	1.2 km	MPC · JPL
837118	2013 BB_{87}	—	October 6, 2002	Socorro	LINEAR	·	1.6 km	MPC · JPL
837119	2013 BQ_{88}	—	March 18, 2018	Haleakala	Pan-STARRS 1	·	1.0 km	MPC · JPL
837120	2013 BS_{88}	—	May 6, 2014	Haleakala	Pan-STARRS 1	·	1.1 km	MPC · JPL
837121	2013 BU_{93}	—	January 16, 2013	Haleakala	Pan-STARRS 1	·	1.3 km	MPC · JPL
837122	2013 BH_{94}	—	January 17, 2013	Haleakala	Pan-STARRS 1	GEF	960 m	MPC · JPL
837123	2013 BX_{95}	—	January 17, 2013	Haleakala	Pan-STARRS 1	·	1.2 km	MPC · JPL
837124	2013 BY_{96}	—	January 16, 2013	Haleakala	Pan-STARRS 1	KOR	990 m	MPC · JPL
837125	2013 BD_{99}	—	January 18, 2013	Mount Lemmon	Mount Lemmon Survey	·	780 m	MPC · JPL
837126	2013 BO_{102}	—	January 17, 2013	Haleakala	Pan-STARRS 1	·	1.4 km	MPC · JPL
837127	2013 CT_{3}	—	January 10, 2013	Haleakala	Pan-STARRS 1	·	1.3 km	MPC · JPL
837128	2013 CO_{4}	—	January 10, 2013	Kitt Peak	Spacewatch	·	1.5 km	MPC · JPL
837129	2013 CR_{11}	—	February 1, 2013	Kitt Peak	Spacewatch	·	520 m	MPC · JPL
837130	2013 CB_{12}	—	January 22, 2013	Kitt Peak	Spacewatch	·	1.9 km	MPC · JPL
837131	2013 CJ_{22}	—	January 6, 2013	Kitt Peak	Spacewatch	H	390 m	MPC · JPL
837132	2013 CR_{22}	—	December 26, 2005	Kitt Peak	Spacewatch	·	630 m	MPC · JPL
837133	2013 CR_{32}	—	January 14, 2013	Mount Lemmon	Mount Lemmon Survey	·	530 m	MPC · JPL
837134	2013 CQ_{35}	—	February 5, 2013	Catalina	CSS	APO	390 m	MPC · JPL
837135	2013 CW_{38}	—	January 17, 2013	Mount Lemmon	Mount Lemmon Survey	BAR	1.1 km	MPC · JPL
837136	2013 CX_{38}	—	February 8, 2013	Haleakala	Pan-STARRS 1	H	410 m	MPC · JPL
837137	2013 CP_{39}	—	February 1, 2013	Kitt Peak	Spacewatch	·	1.4 km	MPC · JPL
837138	2013 CC_{43}	—	October 14, 2001	Sacramento Peak	SDSS	KOR	1.3 km	MPC · JPL
837139	2013 CF_{56}	—	February 8, 2013	Haleakala	Pan-STARRS 1	·	1.1 km	MPC · JPL
837140	2013 CU_{56}	—	August 2, 2011	Haleakala	Pan-STARRS 1	H	500 m	MPC · JPL
837141	2013 CL_{58}	—	February 1, 1995	Kitt Peak	Spacewatch	·	1.2 km	MPC · JPL
837142	2013 CU_{61}	—	October 5, 2002	Sacramento Peak	SDSS	·	1.9 km	MPC · JPL
837143	2013 CA_{65}	—	March 2, 2000	Kitt Peak	Spacewatch	·	500 m	MPC · JPL
837144	2013 CD_{65}	—	March 5, 2002	Sacramento Peak	SDSS	L4	9.5 km	MPC · JPL
837145	2013 CV_{65}	—	February 8, 2013	Haleakala	Pan-STARRS 1	·	1.7 km	MPC · JPL
837146	2013 CQ_{69}	—	May 4, 2000	Sacramento Peak	SDSS	·	1.4 km	MPC · JPL
837147	2013 CQ_{71}	—	October 31, 2008	Mount Lemmon	Mount Lemmon Survey	·	760 m	MPC · JPL
837148	2013 CE_{72}	—	February 19, 2010	WISE	WISE	·	630 m	MPC · JPL
837149	2013 CJ_{78}	—	February 8, 2013	Haleakala	Pan-STARRS 1	·	700 m	MPC · JPL
837150	2013 CQ_{82}	—	February 9, 2013	Haleakala	Pan-STARRS 1	H	450 m	MPC · JPL
837151	2013 CZ_{85}	—	September 3, 2000	Sacramento Peak	SDSS	·	890 m	MPC · JPL
837152	2013 CG_{88}	—	February 11, 2013	Mayhill-ISON	L. Elenin	H	430 m	MPC · JPL
837153	2013 CP_{89}	—	October 10, 2007	Mount Lemmon	Mount Lemmon Survey	·	1.2 km	MPC · JPL
837154	2013 CJ_{94}	—	March 11, 2010	WISE	WISE	·	1.2 km	MPC · JPL
837155	2013 CD_{97}	—	May 26, 2010	WISE	WISE	·	3.2 km	MPC · JPL
837156	2013 CC_{113}	—	February 9, 2013	XuYi	PMO NEO Survey Program	PHO	720 m	MPC · JPL
837157	2013 CE_{128}	—	February 14, 2013	Nogales	M. Schwartz, P. R. Holvorcem	·	990 m	MPC · JPL
837158	2013 CO_{129}	—	February 14, 2013	Haleakala	Pan-STARRS 1	·	1.2 km	MPC · JPL
837159	2013 CS_{131}	—	February 28, 2009	Kitt Peak	Spacewatch	·	980 m	MPC · JPL
837160	2013 CQ_{142}	—	January 14, 2013	ESA OGS	ESA OGS	DOR	1.8 km	MPC · JPL
837161	2013 CZ_{154}	—	February 14, 2013	Haleakala	Pan-STARRS 1	·	1.3 km	MPC · JPL
837162	2013 CW_{160}	—	February 14, 2013	Haleakala	Pan-STARRS 1	·	510 m	MPC · JPL
837163	2013 CJ_{161}	—	September 12, 2004	Mauna Kea	P. A. Wiegert, S. Popa	·	1.9 km	MPC · JPL
837164	2013 CA_{171}	—	February 15, 2013	Haleakala	Pan-STARRS 1	·	830 m	MPC · JPL
837165	2013 CZ_{182}	—	February 5, 2013	Mount Lemmon	Mount Lemmon Survey	HNS	900 m	MPC · JPL
837166	2013 CX_{194}	—	June 19, 2010	WISE	WISE	·	4.0 km	MPC · JPL
837167	2013 CA_{195}	—	March 20, 1999	Sacramento Peak	SDSS	KOR	1.5 km	MPC · JPL
837168	2013 CO_{204}	—	February 9, 2013	Haleakala	Pan-STARRS 1	·	1.8 km	MPC · JPL
837169	2013 CF_{206}	—	January 5, 2013	Mount Lemmon	Mount Lemmon Survey	·	1.9 km	MPC · JPL
837170	2013 CR_{206}	—	September 13, 2007	Kitt Peak	Spacewatch	·	1.0 km	MPC · JPL
837171	2013 CB_{207}	—	February 8, 2013	Haleakala	Pan-STARRS 1	·	530 m	MPC · JPL
837172	2013 CN_{207}	—	February 12, 2013	Westfield	International Astronomical Search Collaboration	·	2.2 km	MPC · JPL
837173	2013 CU_{207}	—	February 5, 2013	Kitt Peak	Spacewatch	H	430 m	MPC · JPL
837174	2013 CC_{211}	—	September 26, 2000	Sacramento Peak	SDSS	EOS	2.0 km	MPC · JPL
837175	2013 CF_{212}	—	February 5, 2013	Kitt Peak	Spacewatch	·	1.4 km	MPC · JPL
837176	2013 CC_{214}	—	January 30, 2006	Kitt Peak	Spacewatch	·	540 m	MPC · JPL
837177	2013 CS_{223}	—	January 13, 2010	WISE	WISE	L4	7.9 km	MPC · JPL
837178	2013 CB_{230}	—	May 2, 2014	Kitt Peak	Spacewatch	·	1.1 km	MPC · JPL
837179	2013 CQ_{230}	—	July 6, 2014	Haleakala	Pan-STARRS 1	·	2.1 km	MPC · JPL
837180	2013 CJ_{231}	—	February 5, 2013	Oukaïmeden	C. Rinner	·	1.4 km	MPC · JPL
837181	2013 CG_{233}	—	September 18, 2003	Kitt Peak	Spacewatch	·	760 m	MPC · JPL
837182	2013 CF_{234}	—	February 8, 2008	Kitt Peak	Spacewatch	·	1.4 km	MPC · JPL
837183	2013 CW_{234}	—	March 5, 2002	Sacramento Peak	SDSS	·	1.9 km	MPC · JPL
837184	2013 CA_{235}	—	February 10, 2013	Haleakala	Pan-STARRS 1	·	970 m	MPC · JPL
837185	2013 CC_{236}	—	February 14, 2013	Haleakala	Pan-STARRS 1	·	1.4 km	MPC · JPL
837186	2013 CK_{236}	—	July 12, 2010	WISE	WISE	·	3.4 km	MPC · JPL
837187	2013 CR_{237}	—	May 8, 2010	WISE	WISE	·	970 m	MPC · JPL
837188	2013 CC_{244}	—	February 3, 2013	Haleakala	Pan-STARRS 1	·	1.2 km	MPC · JPL
837189	2013 CW_{246}	—	February 14, 2013	Haleakala	Pan-STARRS 1	·	530 m	MPC · JPL
837190	2013 CM_{247}	—	February 15, 2013	Haleakala	Pan-STARRS 1	·	1.5 km	MPC · JPL
837191	2013 CV_{248}	—	March 1, 2008	Kitt Peak	Spacewatch	·	1.4 km	MPC · JPL
837192	2013 CX_{248}	—	February 14, 2013	Kitt Peak	Spacewatch	·	1.3 km	MPC · JPL
837193	2013 CK_{253}	—	March 26, 2008	Mount Lemmon	Mount Lemmon Survey	THM	1.6 km	MPC · JPL
837194	2013 CQ_{258}	—	February 13, 2013	Nogales	M. Schwartz, P. R. Holvorcem	·	1.3 km	MPC · JPL
837195	2013 CP_{265}	—	February 3, 2013	Haleakala	Pan-STARRS 1	·	1.5 km	MPC · JPL
837196	2013 CY_{265}	—	February 3, 2013	Haleakala	Pan-STARRS 1	·	1.3 km	MPC · JPL
837197	2013 CB_{266}	—	February 13, 2013	Haleakala	Pan-STARRS 1	EOS	1.3 km	MPC · JPL
837198	2013 CV_{268}	—	February 3, 2013	Haleakala	Pan-STARRS 1	L4	6.0 km	MPC · JPL
837199	2013 CF_{269}	—	February 14, 2013	Haleakala	Pan-STARRS 1	·	1.9 km	MPC · JPL
837200	2013 DJ_{10}	—	January 19, 2013	Kitt Peak	Spacewatch	·	1.3 km	MPC · JPL

== 837201–837300 ==
back to top

Designation			Discovery			Properties		Ref
Permanent	Provisional	Named after	Date	Site	Discoverer(s)	Category	Diam.	Ref
837201	2013 DN_{11}	—	February 17, 2013	Mount Lemmon	Mount Lemmon Survey	·	960 m	MPC · JPL
837202	2013 DP_{13}	—	June 22, 2010	WISE	WISE	DOR	2.1 km	MPC · JPL
837203	2013 DA_{24}	—	February 17, 2013	Mount Lemmon	Mount Lemmon Survey	·	1.5 km	MPC · JPL
837204	2013 DK_{24}	—	February 17, 2013	Mount Lemmon	Mount Lemmon Survey	L4	5.7 km	MPC · JPL
837205	2013 EH	—	March 2, 2013	Haleakala	Pan-STARRS 1	H	490 m	MPC · JPL
837206	2013 EV_{2}	—	February 9, 2013	Haleakala	Pan-STARRS 1	·	730 m	MPC · JPL
837207	2013 ET_{3}	—	March 21, 1999	Sacramento Peak	SDSS	BRA	1.5 km	MPC · JPL
837208	2013 EL_{8}	—	December 30, 2005	Kitt Peak	Spacewatch	·	500 m	MPC · JPL
837209	2013 EH_{15}	—	April 18, 2010	WISE	WISE	·	2.7 km	MPC · JPL
837210	2013 ER_{22}	—	March 5, 2013	Mount Lemmon	Mount Lemmon Survey	·	950 m	MPC · JPL
837211	2013 EU_{22}	—	May 7, 2010	WISE	WISE	·	910 m	MPC · JPL
837212	2013 EB_{24}	—	February 17, 2013	Mount Lemmon	Mount Lemmon Survey	EOS	1.3 km	MPC · JPL
837213	2013 EG_{32}	—	March 8, 2013	Haleakala	Pan-STARRS 1	·	2.8 km	MPC · JPL
837214	2013 EN_{33}	—	January 22, 2006	Socorro	LINEAR	·	410 m	MPC · JPL
837215	2013 EX_{41}	—	November 11, 2001	Sacramento Peak	SDSS	BRA	1.1 km	MPC · JPL
837216	2013 EF_{43}	—	March 6, 2013	Haleakala	Pan-STARRS 1	·	1.7 km	MPC · JPL
837217	2013 EP_{57}	—	March 10, 2005	Mount Lemmon	Mount Lemmon Survey	·	660 m	MPC · JPL
837218	2013 EW_{57}	—	May 15, 2009	Kitt Peak	Spacewatch	·	1.3 km	MPC · JPL
837219	2013 EU_{64}	—	March 8, 2013	Haleakala	Pan-STARRS 1	·	840 m	MPC · JPL
837220	2013 EW_{65}	—	March 4, 2013	Haleakala	Pan-STARRS 1	·	1.4 km	MPC · JPL
837221	2013 EO_{73}	—	March 7, 2013	Mount Lemmon	Mount Lemmon Survey	·	1.5 km	MPC · JPL
837222	2013 ET_{73}	—	March 7, 2013	Mount Lemmon	Mount Lemmon Survey	·	1.1 km	MPC · JPL
837223	2013 EX_{78}	—	March 8, 2013	Haleakala	Pan-STARRS 1	·	1.5 km	MPC · JPL
837224	2013 EA_{85}	—	March 8, 2013	Haleakala	Pan-STARRS 1	EOS	1.4 km	MPC · JPL
837225	2013 EF_{86}	—	October 14, 2001	Sacramento Peak	SDSS	·	1.9 km	MPC · JPL
837226	2013 ED_{92}	—	March 9, 2003	Palomar	NEAT	PHO	800 m	MPC · JPL
837227	2013 EU_{98}	—	March 8, 2013	Haleakala	Pan-STARRS 1	URS	2.3 km	MPC · JPL
837228	2013 EE_{101}	—	March 8, 2013	Haleakala	Pan-STARRS 1	H	350 m	MPC · JPL
837229	2013 EN_{107}	—	March 13, 2013	Mount Lemmon	Mount Lemmon Survey	TIR	1.5 km	MPC · JPL
837230	2013 EB_{110}	—	March 5, 2002	Sacramento Peak	SDSS	V	690 m	MPC · JPL
837231	2013 EF_{112}	—	March 13, 2013	Palomar	Palomar Transient Factory	·	480 m	MPC · JPL
837232	2013 EO_{117}	—	July 7, 2010	WISE	WISE	·	490 m	MPC · JPL
837233	2013 ES_{121}	—	March 8, 2013	Haleakala	Pan-STARRS 1	·	1.2 km	MPC · JPL
837234	2013 EJ_{141}	—	March 13, 2013	Kitt Peak	Research and Education Collaborative Occultation Network	·	770 m	MPC · JPL
837235	2013 EJ_{143}	—	February 8, 2013	Haleakala	Pan-STARRS 1	V	440 m	MPC · JPL
837236	2013 EP_{146}	—	February 14, 2013	Haleakala	Pan-STARRS 1	·	860 m	MPC · JPL
837237	2013 EC_{155}	—	March 14, 2013	Kitt Peak	Spacewatch	·	2.1 km	MPC · JPL
837238	2013 EU_{155}	—	September 21, 2009	Mount Lemmon	Mount Lemmon Survey	·	2.0 km	MPC · JPL
837239	2013 EY_{159}	—	March 4, 2013	Haleakala	Pan-STARRS 1	H	470 m	MPC · JPL
837240	2013 EA_{160}	—	March 6, 2013	Haleakala	Pan-STARRS 1	·	1.0 km	MPC · JPL
837241	2013 EB_{160}	—	May 25, 2010	WISE	WISE	·	2.1 km	MPC · JPL
837242	2013 EM_{161}	—	March 6, 2013	Haleakala	Pan-STARRS 1	·	1.8 km	MPC · JPL
837243	2013 EK_{162}	—	May 11, 2010	WISE	WISE	·	560 m	MPC · JPL
837244	2013 EY_{163}	—	March 4, 2013	Haleakala	Pan-STARRS 1	·	1.6 km	MPC · JPL
837245	2013 EO_{164}	—	March 4, 2013	Haleakala	Pan-STARRS 1	·	1.9 km	MPC · JPL
837246	2013 EV_{164}	—	March 13, 2013	Mount Lemmon	Mount Lemmon Survey	THM	1.5 km	MPC · JPL
837247	2013 EG_{166}	—	March 8, 2013	Haleakala	Pan-STARRS 1	·	1.7 km	MPC · JPL
837248	2013 EF_{170}	—	March 5, 2013	Mount Lemmon	Mount Lemmon Survey	·	500 m	MPC · JPL
837249	2013 EA_{171}	—	March 6, 2013	Haleakala	Pan-STARRS 1	·	1.4 km	MPC · JPL
837250	2013 EX_{175}	—	March 5, 2013	Haleakala	Pan-STARRS 1	·	1.7 km	MPC · JPL
837251	2013 EY_{182}	—	March 5, 2013	Mount Lemmon	Mount Lemmon Survey	·	450 m	MPC · JPL
837252	2013 FT_{7}	—	March 5, 2013	Mount Lemmon	Mount Lemmon Survey	·	2.0 km	MPC · JPL
837253	2013 FW_{13}	—	March 23, 2013	Catalina	CSS	APO · PHA	160 m	MPC · JPL
837254	2013 FN_{22}	—	April 30, 2005	Kitt Peak	Spacewatch	·	880 m	MPC · JPL
837255	2013 FK_{23}	—	March 31, 2013	Mount Lemmon	Mount Lemmon Survey	T_{j} (2.99)	2.2 km	MPC · JPL
837256	2013 FQ_{23}	—	September 19, 1998	Sacramento Peak	SDSS	·	2.9 km	MPC · JPL
837257	2013 FP_{29}	—	March 18, 2013	Mount Lemmon	Mount Lemmon Survey	PHO	750 m	MPC · JPL
837258	2013 FH_{31}	—	March 18, 2013	Kitt Peak	Spacewatch	·	480 m	MPC · JPL
837259	2013 FH_{33}	—	March 16, 2013	Kitt Peak	Spacewatch	TIR	2.0 km	MPC · JPL
837260	2013 FO_{35}	—	March 19, 2013	Haleakala	Pan-STARRS 1	·	1.5 km	MPC · JPL
837261	2013 FO_{37}	—	March 19, 2013	Haleakala	Pan-STARRS 1	·	1.8 km	MPC · JPL
837262	2013 FV_{39}	—	March 18, 2013	Mount Lemmon	Mount Lemmon Survey	EOS	1.3 km	MPC · JPL
837263	2013 FG_{43}	—	March 19, 2013	Haleakala	Pan-STARRS 1	·	1.4 km	MPC · JPL
837264	2013 GR_{5}	—	March 11, 2013	Kitt Peak	Spacewatch	·	2.0 km	MPC · JPL
837265	2013 GC_{7}	—	April 3, 2013	Palomar	Palomar Transient Factory	H	460 m	MPC · JPL
837266	2013 GF_{9}	—	September 2, 2010	Mount Lemmon	Mount Lemmon Survey	·	1.1 km	MPC · JPL
837267	2013 GK_{10}	—	March 11, 2005	Kitt Peak	Spacewatch	3:2	4.4 km	MPC · JPL
837268	2013 GA_{13}	—	March 5, 2013	Haleakala	Pan-STARRS 1	·	3.3 km	MPC · JPL
837269	2013 GO_{16}	—	April 4, 2013	Haleakala	Pan-STARRS 1	·	1.5 km	MPC · JPL
837270	2013 GU_{17}	—	September 21, 2003	Kitt Peak	Spacewatch	H	470 m	MPC · JPL
837271	2013 GV_{24}	—	April 3, 2013	Mount Lemmon	Mount Lemmon Survey	·	1.2 km	MPC · JPL
837272	2013 GE_{33}	—	April 7, 2013	Mount Lemmon	Mount Lemmon Survey	·	1.7 km	MPC · JPL
837273	2013 GN_{44}	—	April 8, 2013	Mount Lemmon	Mount Lemmon Survey	EOS	1.4 km	MPC · JPL
837274	2013 GU_{44}	—	June 1, 1998	La Silla	E. W. Elst	NYS	1.4 km	MPC · JPL
837275	2013 GN_{45}	—	April 5, 2013	Palomar	Palomar Transient Factory	TIR	2.2 km	MPC · JPL
837276	2013 GC_{47}	—	March 8, 2013	Haleakala	Pan-STARRS 1	·	670 m	MPC · JPL
837277	2013 GG_{51}	—	October 5, 2002	Sacramento Peak	SDSS	·	1.9 km	MPC · JPL
837278	2013 GA_{54}	—	April 10, 2013	Haleakala	Pan-STARRS 1	·	570 m	MPC · JPL
837279	2013 GL_{70}	—	April 8, 2013	Kitt Peak	Spacewatch	T_{j} (2.97) · EUP	2.1 km	MPC · JPL
837280	2013 GR_{70}	—	March 21, 1999	Sacramento Peak	SDSS	·	620 m	MPC · JPL
837281	2013 GL_{78}	—	April 12, 2013	Mount Lemmon	Mount Lemmon Survey	·	1.5 km	MPC · JPL
837282	2013 GA_{81}	—	April 28, 2000	Kitt Peak	Spacewatch	·	1.2 km	MPC · JPL
837283	2013 GS_{86}	—	April 14, 2013	Mount Lemmon	Mount Lemmon Survey	EOS	1.4 km	MPC · JPL
837284	2013 GR_{104}	—	March 5, 2013	Kitt Peak	Spacewatch	·	1.8 km	MPC · JPL
837285	2013 GW_{107}	—	February 18, 2013	Mount Lemmon	Mount Lemmon Survey	PHO	720 m	MPC · JPL
837286	2013 GN_{113}	—	May 4, 2000	Sacramento Peak	SDSS	·	1.6 km	MPC · JPL
837287	2013 GK_{114}	—	March 3, 1992	La Silla	UESAC	(5)	1.6 km	MPC · JPL
837288	2013 GY_{116}	—	November 17, 2011	Mount Lemmon	Mount Lemmon Survey	PHO	930 m	MPC · JPL
837289	2013 GV_{119}	—	April 7, 2013	Mount Lemmon	Mount Lemmon Survey	·	1.9 km	MPC · JPL
837290	2013 GA_{121}	—	April 8, 2013	Mount Lemmon	Mount Lemmon Survey	THM	1.7 km	MPC · JPL
837291	2013 GY_{126}	—	August 15, 2014	Haleakala	Pan-STARRS 1	·	2.0 km	MPC · JPL
837292	2013 GF_{127}	—	April 13, 2013	Haleakala	Pan-STARRS 1	·	1.8 km	MPC · JPL
837293	2013 GN_{128}	—	March 6, 2013	Haleakala	Pan-STARRS 1	JUN	820 m	MPC · JPL
837294	2013 GW_{133}	—	March 11, 2013	Elena Remote	Oreshko, A.	·	1.9 km	MPC · JPL
837295	2013 GV_{138}	—	April 13, 2013	Haleakala	Pan-STARRS 1	·	1.2 km	MPC · JPL
837296	2013 GZ_{142}	—	April 13, 2013	Haleakala	Pan-STARRS 1	·	1.7 km	MPC · JPL
837297	2013 GD_{143}	—	April 14, 2013	Palomar	Palomar Transient Factory	·	2.2 km	MPC · JPL
837298	2013 GX_{143}	—	April 7, 2013	Kitt Peak	Spacewatch	EUN	1.1 km	MPC · JPL
837299	2013 GK_{145}	—	April 10, 2013	Mount Lemmon	Mount Lemmon Survey	·	2.1 km	MPC · JPL
837300	2013 GS_{146}	—	April 15, 2013	Haleakala	Pan-STARRS 1	·	2.4 km	MPC · JPL

== 837301–837400 ==
back to top

Designation			Discovery			Properties		Ref
Permanent	Provisional	Named after	Date	Site	Discoverer(s)	Category	Diam.	Ref
837301	2013 GF_{148}	—	April 15, 2013	Haleakala	Pan-STARRS 1	·	970 m	MPC · JPL
837302	2013 GJ_{148}	—	June 24, 2014	Haleakala	Pan-STARRS 1	·	1.6 km	MPC · JPL
837303	2013 GM_{148}	—	April 12, 2013	Haleakala	Pan-STARRS 1	·	610 m	MPC · JPL
837304	2013 GP_{148}	—	April 15, 2010	WISE	WISE	·	1.5 km	MPC · JPL
837305	2013 GW_{148}	—	April 15, 2013	Haleakala	Pan-STARRS 1	·	2.0 km	MPC · JPL
837306	2013 GC_{149}	—	April 15, 2013	Haleakala	Pan-STARRS 1	LIX	2.3 km	MPC · JPL
837307	2013 GP_{151}	—	April 12, 2013	Haleakala	Pan-STARRS 1	·	1.5 km	MPC · JPL
837308	2013 GG_{154}	—	April 7, 2013	Mount Lemmon	Mount Lemmon Survey	EOS	1.5 km	MPC · JPL
837309	2013 GE_{156}	—	April 10, 2013	Haleakala	Pan-STARRS 1	H	370 m	MPC · JPL
837310	2013 GQ_{156}	—	April 14, 2013	Mount Lemmon	Mount Lemmon Survey	·	2.3 km	MPC · JPL
837311	2013 GP_{158}	—	April 13, 2013	Haleakala	Pan-STARRS 1	·	640 m	MPC · JPL
837312	2013 GC_{159}	—	April 12, 2013	Haleakala	Pan-STARRS 1	TIR	2.1 km	MPC · JPL
837313	2013 GN_{161}	—	April 8, 2013	Mount Lemmon	Mount Lemmon Survey	EOS	1.3 km	MPC · JPL
837314	2013 GF_{162}	—	April 12, 2013	Haleakala	Pan-STARRS 1	·	1.7 km	MPC · JPL
837315	2013 GF_{164}	—	April 15, 2013	Haleakala	Pan-STARRS 1	VER	2.1 km	MPC · JPL
837316	2013 GH_{164}	—	April 10, 2013	Haleakala	Pan-STARRS 1	·	930 m	MPC · JPL
837317	2013 GV_{167}	—	April 14, 2013	Calar Alto	F. Hormuth	LIX	2.5 km	MPC · JPL
837318	2013 GL_{168}	—	April 13, 2013	Kitt Peak	Spacewatch	LIX	2.3 km	MPC · JPL
837319	2013 GE_{169}	—	April 9, 2013	Haleakala	Pan-STARRS 1	·	1.8 km	MPC · JPL
837320	2013 GM_{169}	—	April 10, 2013	Haleakala	Pan-STARRS 1	THM	1.7 km	MPC · JPL
837321	2013 GD_{171}	—	April 10, 2013	Haleakala	Pan-STARRS 1	·	1.9 km	MPC · JPL
837322	2013 HL_{2}	—	November 9, 2004	Mauna Kea	Veillet, C.	·	580 m	MPC · JPL
837323	2013 HD_{3}	—	April 7, 2013	Kitt Peak	Spacewatch	·	2.3 km	MPC · JPL
837324	2013 HG_{8}	—	April 10, 2002	Socorro	LINEAR	·	1.1 km	MPC · JPL
837325	2013 HF_{18}	—	March 19, 2013	Palomar	Palomar Transient Factory	T_{j} (2.99)	2.6 km	MPC · JPL
837326	2013 HL_{19}	—	October 13, 1999	Sacramento Peak	SDSS	·	4.5 km	MPC · JPL
837327	2013 HD_{23}	—	February 21, 2001	Sacramento Peak	SDSS	·	3.2 km	MPC · JPL
837328	2013 HU_{23}	—	March 7, 2013	Siding Spring	SSS	·	2.3 km	MPC · JPL
837329	2013 HV_{25}	—	May 2, 2013	Palomar	Palomar Transient Factory	·	2.2 km	MPC · JPL
837330	2013 HD_{30}	—	April 16, 2013	Cerro Tololo-DECam	DECam	·	2.1 km	MPC · JPL
837331	2013 HF_{30}	—	April 16, 2013	Cerro Tololo-DECam	DECam	·	1.6 km	MPC · JPL
837332	2013 HV_{31}	—	April 16, 2013	Cerro Tololo-DECam	DECam	V	450 m	MPC · JPL
837333	2013 HA_{34}	—	April 16, 2013	Cerro Tololo-DECam	DECam	·	1.2 km	MPC · JPL
837334	2013 HB_{36}	—	April 16, 2013	Cerro Tololo-DECam	DECam	V	370 m	MPC · JPL
837335	2013 HP_{36}	—	April 9, 2013	Haleakala	Pan-STARRS 1	·	460 m	MPC · JPL
837336	2013 HV_{36}	—	April 9, 2013	Haleakala	Pan-STARRS 1	V	430 m	MPC · JPL
837337	2013 HK_{38}	—	April 16, 2013	Cerro Tololo-DECam	DECam	·	500 m	MPC · JPL
837338	2013 HR_{41}	—	April 9, 2013	Haleakala	Pan-STARRS 1	·	1.6 km	MPC · JPL
837339	2013 HK_{44}	—	September 19, 2009	Kitt Peak	Spacewatch	·	1.8 km	MPC · JPL
837340	2013 HD_{47}	—	April 16, 2013	Cerro Tololo-DECam	DECam	·	1.5 km	MPC · JPL
837341	2013 HP_{52}	—	August 29, 2011	Kitt Peak	Spacewatch	H	330 m	MPC · JPL
837342	2013 HO_{56}	—	September 25, 2009	Kitt Peak	Spacewatch	·	1.7 km	MPC · JPL
837343	2013 HT_{64}	—	April 9, 2013	Haleakala	Pan-STARRS 1	·	790 m	MPC · JPL
837344	2013 HC_{66}	—	September 17, 2009	Mount Lemmon	Mount Lemmon Survey	·	1.5 km	MPC · JPL
837345	2013 HJ_{77}	—	April 9, 2013	Haleakala	Pan-STARRS 1	EOS	1.6 km	MPC · JPL
837346	2013 HQ_{78}	—	April 9, 2013	Haleakala	Pan-STARRS 1	·	1.8 km	MPC · JPL
837347	2013 HV_{78}	—	November 2, 2010	Mount Lemmon	Mount Lemmon Survey	·	1.6 km	MPC · JPL
837348	2013 HM_{87}	—	April 14, 2008	Kitt Peak	Spacewatch	·	1.1 km	MPC · JPL
837349	2013 HL_{95}	—	April 10, 2013	Haleakala	Pan-STARRS 1	·	400 m	MPC · JPL
837350	2013 HY_{104}	—	April 16, 2013	Cerro Tololo-DECam	DECam	·	1.5 km	MPC · JPL
837351	2013 HE_{106}	—	April 10, 2013	Haleakala	Pan-STARRS 1	·	650 m	MPC · JPL
837352	2013 HH_{108}	—	April 10, 2013	Haleakala	Pan-STARRS 1	THM	1.5 km	MPC · JPL
837353	2013 HR_{119}	—	April 10, 2013	Haleakala	Pan-STARRS 1	EUN	720 m	MPC · JPL
837354	2013 HV_{127}	—	April 17, 2013	Cerro Tololo-DECam	DECam	EOS	1.2 km	MPC · JPL
837355	2013 HJ_{138}	—	October 17, 2010	Mount Lemmon	Mount Lemmon Survey	·	1.8 km	MPC · JPL
837356	2013 HN_{146}	—	April 9, 2013	Haleakala	Pan-STARRS 1	AGN	810 m	MPC · JPL
837357	2013 HD_{159}	—	April 17, 2013	Haleakala	Pan-STARRS 1	·	1.2 km	MPC · JPL
837358	2013 HG_{159}	—	January 7, 2010	WISE	WISE	·	2.3 km	MPC · JPL
837359	2013 HY_{159}	—	March 16, 2013	Kitt Peak	Spacewatch	JUN	680 m	MPC · JPL
837360	2013 HM_{162}	—	March 20, 2007	Mount Lemmon	Mount Lemmon Survey	·	2.2 km	MPC · JPL
837361	2013 HQ_{164}	—	April 17, 2013	Haleakala	Pan-STARRS 1	·	1.8 km	MPC · JPL
837362	2013 JE_{7}	—	April 12, 2013	Haleakala	Pan-STARRS 1	EOS	1.6 km	MPC · JPL
837363	2013 JF_{10}	—	April 13, 2013	Haleakala	Pan-STARRS 1	·	490 m	MPC · JPL
837364	2013 JL_{12}	—	May 8, 2013	Haleakala	Pan-STARRS 1	·	860 m	MPC · JPL
837365	2013 JO_{12}	—	April 15, 2013	Haleakala	Pan-STARRS 1	·	2.0 km	MPC · JPL
837366	2013 JX_{14}	—	May 5, 2013	Haleakala	Pan-STARRS 1	centaur	20 km	MPC · JPL
837367	2013 JB_{27}	—	April 30, 2013	Palomar	Palomar Transient Factory	·	2.4 km	MPC · JPL
837368	2013 JD_{29}	—	May 26, 2010	WISE	WISE	EUP	5.7 km	MPC · JPL
837369	2013 JF_{30}	—	April 16, 2013	Haleakala	Pan-STARRS 1	·	560 m	MPC · JPL
837370	2013 JP_{32}	—	May 12, 2013	Kitt Peak	Spacewatch	H	420 m	MPC · JPL
837371	2013 JY_{34}	—	May 15, 2013	Haleakala	Pan-STARRS 1	H	320 m	MPC · JPL
837372	2013 JP_{38}	—	April 17, 2013	Haleakala	Pan-STARRS 1	·	2.0 km	MPC · JPL
837373	2013 JP_{40}	—	November 23, 2009	Mount Lemmon	Mount Lemmon Survey	·	2.8 km	MPC · JPL
837374	2013 JQ_{40}	—	May 12, 2013	Haleakala	Pan-STARRS 1	·	2.2 km	MPC · JPL
837375	2013 JQ_{41}	—	May 10, 2013	Kitt Peak	Spacewatch	·	2.3 km	MPC · JPL
837376	2013 JX_{43}	—	April 15, 2010	WISE	WISE	·	500 m	MPC · JPL
837377	2013 JC_{56}	—	May 8, 2013	Haleakala	Pan-STARRS 1	·	460 m	MPC · JPL
837378	2013 JY_{57}	—	May 8, 2013	Haleakala	Pan-STARRS 1	VER	1.9 km	MPC · JPL
837379	2013 JB_{60}	—	April 8, 2013	Kitt Peak	Spacewatch	·	2.0 km	MPC · JPL
837380	2013 JU_{62}	—	April 12, 2013	Haleakala	Pan-STARRS 1	THB	2.0 km	MPC · JPL
837381	2013 JS_{66}	—	May 15, 2013	Haleakala	Pan-STARRS 1	·	2.3 km	MPC · JPL
837382	2013 JC_{69}	—	January 15, 2010	WISE	WISE	EUP	3.3 km	MPC · JPL
837383	2013 JD_{70}	—	May 15, 2013	Kitt Peak	Spacewatch	·	2.0 km	MPC · JPL
837384	2013 JU_{70}	—	May 15, 2013	Haleakala	Pan-STARRS 1	·	910 m	MPC · JPL
837385	2013 JA_{71}	—	May 12, 2013	Haleakala	Pan-STARRS 1	·	1.6 km	MPC · JPL
837386	2013 JF_{75}	—	May 5, 2013	Haleakala	Pan-STARRS 1	·	610 m	MPC · JPL
837387	2013 JY_{76}	—	May 9, 2013	Haleakala	Pan-STARRS 1	·	2.2 km	MPC · JPL
837388	2013 JK_{77}	—	May 8, 2013	Haleakala	Pan-STARRS 1	EOS	1.5 km	MPC · JPL
837389	2013 JP_{78}	—	May 8, 2013	Haleakala	Pan-STARRS 1	TIR	1.6 km	MPC · JPL
837390	2013 JX_{78}	—	May 15, 2013	Haleakala	Pan-STARRS 1	·	2.2 km	MPC · JPL
837391	2013 JE_{82}	—	May 8, 2013	Haleakala	Pan-STARRS 1	·	910 m	MPC · JPL
837392	2013 JW_{82}	—	May 12, 2013	Kitt Peak	Spacewatch	·	2.0 km	MPC · JPL
837393	2013 JM_{83}	—	May 12, 2013	Haleakala	Pan-STARRS 1	LIX	2.4 km	MPC · JPL
837394	2013 JA_{84}	—	May 8, 2013	Haleakala	Pan-STARRS 1	THM	1.5 km	MPC · JPL
837395	2013 JC_{84}	—	May 8, 2013	Haleakala	Pan-STARRS 1	·	2.4 km	MPC · JPL
837396	2013 JE_{85}	—	May 15, 2013	Haleakala	Pan-STARRS 1	·	1.8 km	MPC · JPL
837397	2013 JL_{85}	—	May 8, 2013	Haleakala	Pan-STARRS 1	·	1.3 km	MPC · JPL
837398	2013 KR_{6}	—	May 22, 2013	Mount Lemmon	Mount Lemmon Survey	T_{j} (2.97) · critical	1.6 km	MPC · JPL
837399	2013 KN_{10}	—	May 31, 2013	Haleakala	Pan-STARRS 1	·	2.7 km	MPC · JPL
837400	2013 KQ_{13}	—	May 16, 2013	Mount Lemmon	Mount Lemmon Survey	·	2.8 km	MPC · JPL

== 837401–837500 ==
back to top

Designation			Discovery			Properties		Ref
Permanent	Provisional	Named after	Date	Site	Discoverer(s)	Category	Diam.	Ref
837401	2013 KX_{19}	—	May 31, 2013	Kitt Peak	Spacewatch	H	360 m	MPC · JPL
837402	2013 KL_{20}	—	May 20, 2013	Kitt Peak	Spacewatch	·	2.2 km	MPC · JPL
837403	2013 KS_{20}	—	May 16, 2013	Haleakala	Pan-STARRS 1	·	2.2 km	MPC · JPL
837404	2013 LS_{3}	—	June 1, 2013	Haleakala	Pan-STARRS 1	H	320 m	MPC · JPL
837405	2013 LM_{7}	—	September 10, 2000	Anderson Mesa	LONEOS	·	680 m	MPC · JPL
837406	2013 LE_{9}	—	June 3, 2013	Kitt Peak	Spacewatch	T_{j} (2.99)	2.0 km	MPC · JPL
837407	2013 LR_{10}	—	June 4, 2013	Mount Lemmon	Mount Lemmon Survey	·	1.5 km	MPC · JPL
837408	2013 LK_{12}	—	May 4, 2000	Sacramento Peak	SDSS	MAR	880 m	MPC · JPL
837409	2013 LC_{16}	—	December 18, 2001	Sacramento Peak	SDSS	BAR	1.3 km	MPC · JPL
837410	2013 LL_{17}	—	May 30, 2013	Mount Lemmon	Mount Lemmon Survey	·	2.1 km	MPC · JPL
837411	2013 LR_{20}	—	June 1, 2013	Haleakala	Pan-STARRS 1	·	2.9 km	MPC · JPL
837412	2013 LJ_{21}	—	October 17, 2010	Mount Lemmon	Mount Lemmon Survey	·	650 m	MPC · JPL
837413	2013 LO_{21}	—	June 2, 2013	Mount Lemmon	Mount Lemmon Survey	·	2.3 km	MPC · JPL
837414	2013 LW_{25}	—	May 9, 2013	Kitt Peak	Spacewatch	·	1.8 km	MPC · JPL
837415	2013 LG_{26}	—	June 8, 2013	Mount Lemmon	Mount Lemmon Survey	·	2.2 km	MPC · JPL
837416	2013 LR_{27}	—	July 14, 2010	WISE	WISE	PHO	2.7 km	MPC · JPL
837417	2013 LA_{30}	—	October 18, 2001	Palomar	NEAT	·	1.2 km	MPC · JPL
837418	2013 LK_{32}	—	April 23, 2013	Mount Lemmon	Mount Lemmon Survey	T_{j} (2.99) · EUP	3.1 km	MPC · JPL
837419	2013 LN_{35}	—	May 16, 2013	Haleakala	Pan-STARRS 1	·	670 m	MPC · JPL
837420	2013 LH_{36}	—	June 6, 2013	Nogales	M. Schwartz, P. R. Holvorcem	·	3.3 km	MPC · JPL
837421	2013 LU_{36}	—	January 30, 2009	Mount Lemmon	Mount Lemmon Survey	·	590 m	MPC · JPL
837422	2013 LY_{36}	—	June 15, 2013	Mount Lemmon	Mount Lemmon Survey	·	1.0 km	MPC · JPL
837423	2013 LK_{37}	—	March 4, 2016	Haleakala	Pan-STARRS 1	V	480 m	MPC · JPL
837424	2013 LW_{37}	—	June 11, 2013	Mount Lemmon	Mount Lemmon Survey	THB	2.4 km	MPC · JPL
837425	2013 LO_{38}	—	June 4, 2013	Haleakala	Pan-STARRS 1	T_{j} (2.99)	3.0 km	MPC · JPL
837426	2013 LU_{38}	—	June 5, 2013	Mount Lemmon	Mount Lemmon Survey	·	2.2 km	MPC · JPL
837427	2013 LH_{39}	—	October 24, 2014	Mount Lemmon	Mount Lemmon Survey	·	1.1 km	MPC · JPL
837428	2013 LK_{39}	—	June 10, 2013	Mount Lemmon	Mount Lemmon Survey	H	320 m	MPC · JPL
837429	2013 LO_{39}	—	June 12, 2013	Haleakala	Pan-STARRS 1	·	2.5 km	MPC · JPL
837430	2013 LU_{39}	—	June 2, 2013	Kitt Peak	Spacewatch	T_{j} (2.99) · EUP	2.3 km	MPC · JPL
837431	2013 LA_{40}	—	March 4, 2016	Haleakala	Pan-STARRS 1	·	440 m	MPC · JPL
837432	2013 LZ_{40}	—	June 7, 2013	Haleakala	Pan-STARRS 1	NYS	690 m	MPC · JPL
837433	2013 LC_{42}	—	July 4, 2010	Kitt Peak	Spacewatch	·	430 m	MPC · JPL
837434	2013 LG_{43}	—	June 7, 2013	Haleakala	Pan-STARRS 1	·	2.2 km	MPC · JPL
837435	2013 LF_{45}	—	June 5, 2013	Mount Lemmon	Mount Lemmon Survey	·	2.3 km	MPC · JPL
837436	2013 MN	—	June 7, 2013	Haleakala	Pan-STARRS 1	·	1.7 km	MPC · JPL
837437	2013 MN_{1}	—	June 4, 2013	Kitt Peak	Spacewatch	H	390 m	MPC · JPL
837438	2013 MV_{6}	—	June 18, 2005	Mount Lemmon	Mount Lemmon Survey	H	540 m	MPC · JPL
837439	2013 MX_{14}	—	June 30, 2013	Haleakala	Pan-STARRS 1	·	800 m	MPC · JPL
837440	2013 ML_{15}	—	June 18, 2013	Haleakala	Pan-STARRS 1	·	2.5 km	MPC · JPL
837441	2013 MA_{17}	—	June 17, 2013	Haleakala	Pan-STARRS 1	·	1.2 km	MPC · JPL
837442	2013 ME_{17}	—	January 27, 2010	WISE	WISE	·	3.4 km	MPC · JPL
837443	2013 MT_{17}	—	September 19, 2001	Sacramento Peak	SDSS	·	1.2 km	MPC · JPL
837444	2013 MP_{18}	—	June 18, 2013	Haleakala	Pan-STARRS 1	·	2.0 km	MPC · JPL
837445	2013 MU_{19}	—	June 18, 2013	Haleakala	Pan-STARRS 1	EOS	1.5 km	MPC · JPL
837446	2013 MY_{22}	—	June 30, 2013	Haleakala	Pan-STARRS 1	GEF	800 m	MPC · JPL
837447	2013 MB_{23}	—	June 18, 2013	Haleakala	Pan-STARRS 1	·	880 m	MPC · JPL
837448	2013 NK_{9}	—	July 29, 2005	Palomar	NEAT	(5)	910 m	MPC · JPL
837449	2013 NJ_{10}	—	July 4, 2013	Haleakala	Pan-STARRS 1	APO · PHA	760 m	MPC · JPL
837450	2013 ND_{13}	—	April 6, 2008	Kitt Peak	Spacewatch	·	1.2 km	MPC · JPL
837451	2013 NO_{15}	—	July 14, 2013	Haleakala	Pan-STARRS 1	·	530 m	MPC · JPL
837452	2013 NT_{15}	—	July 12, 2013	Haleakala	Pan-STARRS 1	·	1.2 km	MPC · JPL
837453	2013 NQ_{18}	—	February 13, 2002	Sacramento Peak	SDSS	·	1.7 km	MPC · JPL
837454	2013 NY_{19}	—	July 8, 2013	Haleakala	Pan-STARRS 1	·	950 m	MPC · JPL
837455	2013 NK_{21}	—	July 1, 2013	Haleakala	Pan-STARRS 1	·	2.1 km	MPC · JPL
837456	2013 NX_{24}	—	March 16, 2012	Mount Lemmon	Mount Lemmon Survey	·	2.0 km	MPC · JPL
837457	2013 NO_{25}	—	July 14, 2013	Haleakala	Pan-STARRS 1	NYS	770 m	MPC · JPL
837458	2013 NN_{27}	—	August 30, 2005	Kitt Peak	Spacewatch	(5)	850 m	MPC · JPL
837459	2013 NL_{28}	—	January 2, 2011	Mount Lemmon	Mount Lemmon Survey	·	3.0 km	MPC · JPL
837460	2013 NY_{28}	—	July 6, 2013	Haleakala	Pan-STARRS 1	·	1.8 km	MPC · JPL
837461	2013 NF_{33}	—	July 13, 2013	Haleakala	Pan-STARRS 1	·	950 m	MPC · JPL
837462	2013 NO_{33}	—	July 14, 2013	Haleakala	Pan-STARRS 1	·	890 m	MPC · JPL
837463	2013 NB_{34}	—	July 14, 2013	Bergisch Gladbach	W. Bickel	·	1 km	MPC · JPL
837464	2013 NN_{34}	—	July 15, 2013	Haleakala	Pan-STARRS 1	·	1.7 km	MPC · JPL
837465	2013 NU_{34}	—	July 15, 2013	Haleakala	Pan-STARRS 1	·	930 m	MPC · JPL
837466	2013 NP_{36}	—	September 18, 2014	Haleakala	Pan-STARRS 1	·	2.2 km	MPC · JPL
837467	2013 NV_{37}	—	March 26, 2010	WISE	WISE	·	1.6 km	MPC · JPL
837468	2013 NW_{41}	—	September 19, 2003	Kitt Peak	Spacewatch	·	1.5 km	MPC · JPL
837469	2013 NY_{41}	—	October 8, 2008	Mount Lemmon	Mount Lemmon Survey	·	1.6 km	MPC · JPL
837470	2013 NF_{46}	—	July 15, 2013	Haleakala	Pan-STARRS 1	·	1.5 km	MPC · JPL
837471	2013 NZ_{46}	—	July 14, 2013	Haleakala	Pan-STARRS 1	·	680 m	MPC · JPL
837472	2013 NM_{49}	—	July 13, 2013	Mount Lemmon	Mount Lemmon Survey	·	930 m	MPC · JPL
837473	2013 NN_{49}	—	July 6, 2013	Haleakala	Pan-STARRS 1	·	830 m	MPC · JPL
837474	2013 NF_{55}	—	July 2, 2013	Haleakala	Pan-STARRS 1	·	590 m	MPC · JPL
837475	2013 NH_{64}	—	July 15, 2013	Haleakala	Pan-STARRS 1	·	690 m	MPC · JPL
837476	2013 NA_{65}	—	July 14, 2013	Haleakala	Pan-STARRS 1	·	850 m	MPC · JPL
837477	2013 NM_{65}	—	July 13, 2013	Haleakala	Pan-STARRS 1	·	890 m	MPC · JPL
837478	2013 NZ_{65}	—	July 14, 2013	Haleakala	Pan-STARRS 1	·	1.1 km	MPC · JPL
837479	2013 NH_{66}	—	July 14, 2013	Haleakala	Pan-STARRS 1	·	830 m	MPC · JPL
837480	2013 NU_{68}	—	April 2, 2009	Mount Lemmon	Mount Lemmon Survey	·	550 m	MPC · JPL
837481	2013 NY_{69}	—	July 1, 2013	Haleakala	Pan-STARRS 1	·	1.4 km	MPC · JPL
837482	2013 NW_{70}	—	July 15, 2013	Haleakala	Pan-STARRS 1	·	1.2 km	MPC · JPL
837483	2013 NG_{73}	—	July 14, 2013	Haleakala	Pan-STARRS 1	·	850 m	MPC · JPL
837484	2013 NW_{73}	—	July 14, 2013	Haleakala	Pan-STARRS 1	MAR	680 m	MPC · JPL
837485	2013 OZ	—	November 20, 2009	Mount Lemmon	Mount Lemmon Survey	LUT	3.8 km	MPC · JPL
837486	2013 OC_{2}	—	March 20, 1999	Sacramento Peak	SDSS	·	1.7 km	MPC · JPL
837487	2013 OE_{4}	—	July 19, 2013	Haleakala	Pan-STARRS 1	·	1.4 km	MPC · JPL
837488	2013 OV_{4}	—	August 3, 2000	Kitt Peak	Spacewatch	·	1.3 km	MPC · JPL
837489	2013 OZ_{6}	—	June 30, 2013	Haleakala	Pan-STARRS 1	·	940 m	MPC · JPL
837490	2013 OX_{11}	—	July 16, 2013	Haleakala	Pan-STARRS 1	EUN	830 m	MPC · JPL
837491	2013 OE_{12}	—	September 6, 2008	Mount Lemmon	Mount Lemmon Survey	·	1.5 km	MPC · JPL
837492	2013 OP_{13}	—	July 30, 2013	Kitt Peak	Spacewatch	·	750 m	MPC · JPL
837493	2013 OJ_{14}	—	July 16, 2013	Haleakala	Pan-STARRS 1	·	2.4 km	MPC · JPL
837494	2013 OC_{15}	—	July 19, 2013	Haleakala	Pan-STARRS 1	·	1.4 km	MPC · JPL
837495	2013 OH_{16}	—	July 16, 2013	Haleakala	Pan-STARRS 1	·	430 m	MPC · JPL
837496	2013 PC_{1}	—	August 2, 2013	Haleakala	Pan-STARRS 1	·	1 km	MPC · JPL
837497	2013 PS_{4}	—	July 2, 2013	Haleakala	Pan-STARRS 1	·	660 m	MPC · JPL
837498	2013 PX_{5}	—	August 2, 2013	Haleakala	Pan-STARRS 1	·	670 m	MPC · JPL
837499	2013 PT_{6}	—	July 14, 2013	Haleakala	Pan-STARRS 1	H	300 m	MPC · JPL
837500	2013 PU_{8}	—	February 7, 2010	WISE	WISE	·	2.6 km	MPC · JPL

== 837501–837600 ==
back to top

Designation			Discovery			Properties		Ref
Permanent	Provisional	Named after	Date	Site	Discoverer(s)	Category	Diam.	Ref
837501	2013 PR_{9}	—	August 3, 2013	Haleakala	Pan-STARRS 1	·	820 m	MPC · JPL
837502	2013 PY_{10}	—	August 17, 2009	Kitt Peak	Spacewatch	·	940 m	MPC · JPL
837503	2013 PN_{12}	—	July 14, 2013	Haleakala	Pan-STARRS 1	H	290 m	MPC · JPL
837504	2013 PG_{21}	—	April 8, 2010	WISE	WISE	·	1.8 km	MPC · JPL
837505	2013 PH_{24}	—	August 8, 2013	Haleakala	Pan-STARRS 1	·	820 m	MPC · JPL
837506	2013 PZ_{25}	—	October 4, 1996	La Silla	E. W. Elst	·	1.7 km	MPC · JPL
837507	2013 PX_{26}	—	August 8, 2013	Kitt Peak	Spacewatch	ADE	1.7 km	MPC · JPL
837508	2013 PL_{28}	—	August 27, 2009	Kitt Peak	Spacewatch	·	540 m	MPC · JPL
837509	2013 PH_{29}	—	August 9, 2013	Kitt Peak	Spacewatch	THB	2.5 km	MPC · JPL
837510	2013 PB_{33}	—	June 12, 2013	Mount Lemmon	Mount Lemmon Survey	·	1.2 km	MPC · JPL
837511	2013 PW_{42}	—	August 9, 2013	Kitt Peak	Spacewatch	NYS	680 m	MPC · JPL
837512	2013 PG_{50}	—	October 19, 2003	Sacramento Peak	SDSS	·	540 m	MPC · JPL
837513	2013 PG_{54}	—	October 5, 2002	Sacramento Peak	SDSS	·	2.1 km	MPC · JPL
837514	2013 PW_{57}	—	August 3, 2013	Haleakala	Pan-STARRS 1	·	1.1 km	MPC · JPL
837515	2013 PT_{59}	—	June 10, 2013	Mount Lemmon	Mount Lemmon Survey	·	430 m	MPC · JPL
837516	2013 PY_{61}	—	August 15, 2013	Haleakala	Pan-STARRS 1	·	550 m	MPC · JPL
837517	2013 PT_{64}	—	March 29, 2010	WISE	WISE	·	2.5 km	MPC · JPL
837518	2013 PR_{65}	—	August 15, 2013	Haleakala	Pan-STARRS 1	EOS	1.3 km	MPC · JPL
837519	2013 PJ_{66}	—	August 15, 2013	Haleakala	Pan-STARRS 1	·	1.6 km	MPC · JPL
837520	2013 PU_{68}	—	June 17, 2013	Mount Lemmon	Mount Lemmon Survey	EUP	3.2 km	MPC · JPL
837521	2013 PF_{69}	—	June 4, 2006	Mount Lemmon	Mount Lemmon Survey	·	600 m	MPC · JPL
837522	2013 PJ_{71}	—	October 24, 2009	Mount Lemmon	Mount Lemmon Survey	·	2.2 km	MPC · JPL
837523	2013 PA_{75}	—	February 7, 2006	Kitt Peak	Spacewatch	·	590 m	MPC · JPL
837524	2013 PC_{77}	—	September 13, 2007	Kitt Peak	Spacewatch	·	2.2 km	MPC · JPL
837525	2013 PD_{78}	—	August 4, 2013	Haleakala	Pan-STARRS 1	·	1.3 km	MPC · JPL
837526	2013 PZ_{78}	—	August 12, 2013	Kitt Peak	Spacewatch	·	1.1 km	MPC · JPL
837527	2013 PQ_{83}	—	August 15, 2013	Haleakala	Pan-STARRS 1	·	720 m	MPC · JPL
837528	2013 PA_{89}	—	August 15, 2013	Haleakala	Pan-STARRS 1	(194) · critical	580 m	MPC · JPL
837529	2013 PB_{89}	—	August 16, 2009	Kitt Peak	Spacewatch	·	490 m	MPC · JPL
837530	2013 PC_{89}	—	April 7, 2010	WISE	WISE	·	3.3 km	MPC · JPL
837531	2013 PB_{91}	—	August 15, 2013	Haleakala	Pan-STARRS 1	·	1.8 km	MPC · JPL
837532	2013 PH_{91}	—	August 14, 2013	Haleakala	Pan-STARRS 1	THM	1.7 km	MPC · JPL
837533	2013 PF_{92}	—	January 3, 2016	Haleakala	Pan-STARRS 1	·	2.1 km	MPC · JPL
837534	2013 PG_{92}	—	October 7, 2008	Mount Lemmon	Mount Lemmon Survey	·	2.1 km	MPC · JPL
837535	2013 PL_{92}	—	January 30, 2016	Mount Lemmon	Mount Lemmon Survey	T_{j} (2.99)	2.2 km	MPC · JPL
837536	2013 PB_{93}	—	August 15, 2013	Haleakala	Pan-STARRS 1	·	420 m	MPC · JPL
837537	2013 PE_{93}	—	August 8, 2013	Haleakala	Pan-STARRS 1	·	2.4 km	MPC · JPL
837538	2013 PP_{93}	—	August 12, 2013	Haleakala	Pan-STARRS 1	·	570 m	MPC · JPL
837539	2013 PS_{93}	—	August 15, 2013	Haleakala	Pan-STARRS 1	·	1.9 km	MPC · JPL
837540	2013 PQ_{98}	—	August 15, 2013	Haleakala	Pan-STARRS 1	·	2.2 km	MPC · JPL
837541	2013 PP_{102}	—	August 8, 2013	Haleakala	Pan-STARRS 1	H	410 m	MPC · JPL
837542	2013 PS_{106}	—	August 12, 2013	Haleakala	Pan-STARRS 1	·	810 m	MPC · JPL
837543	2013 PE_{109}	—	August 10, 2013	Kitt Peak	Spacewatch	NYS	840 m	MPC · JPL
837544	2013 PM_{109}	—	August 4, 2013	Haleakala	Pan-STARRS 1	·	470 m	MPC · JPL
837545	2013 PS_{111}	—	August 12, 2013	Kitt Peak	Spacewatch	·	470 m	MPC · JPL
837546	2013 PW_{111}	—	August 14, 2013	Haleakala	Pan-STARRS 1	·	590 m	MPC · JPL
837547	2013 PS_{113}	—	August 15, 2013	Haleakala	Pan-STARRS 1	·	1.7 km	MPC · JPL
837548	2013 PC_{114}	—	August 12, 2013	Haleakala	Pan-STARRS 1	·	1.1 km	MPC · JPL
837549	2013 PC_{119}	—	August 12, 2013	Haleakala	Pan-STARRS 1	·	1.3 km	MPC · JPL
837550	2013 PK_{119}	—	August 12, 2013	Haleakala	Pan-STARRS 1	T_{j} (2.99) · 3:2	3.3 km	MPC · JPL
837551	2013 PN_{119}	—	August 8, 2013	Haleakala	Pan-STARRS 1	·	640 m	MPC · JPL
837552	2013 PZ_{120}	—	August 14, 2013	Haleakala	Pan-STARRS 1	·	550 m	MPC · JPL
837553	2013 PE_{124}	—	August 14, 2013	Haleakala	Pan-STARRS 1	·	1.0 km	MPC · JPL
837554	2013 PU_{124}	—	August 12, 2013	Kitt Peak	Spacewatch	AGN	840 m	MPC · JPL
837555	2013 PA_{126}	—	August 8, 2013	Haleakala	Pan-STARRS 1	KON	1.7 km	MPC · JPL
837556	2013 PF_{130}	—	August 4, 2013	Haleakala	Pan-STARRS 1	·	1.0 km	MPC · JPL
837557	2013 PR_{134}	—	August 15, 2013	Haleakala	Pan-STARRS 1	·	1.8 km	MPC · JPL
837558	2013 PV_{134}	—	August 4, 2013	Haleakala	Pan-STARRS 1	·	2.0 km	MPC · JPL
837559	2013 PH_{139}	—	August 4, 2013	Haleakala	Pan-STARRS 1	·	1.3 km	MPC · JPL
837560	2013 PK_{141}	—	November 27, 2022	Kitt Peak	Bok NEO Survey	·	1.0 km	MPC · JPL
837561	2013 QG	—	July 15, 2013	Haleakala	Pan-STARRS 1	·	910 m	MPC · JPL
837562	2013 QH_{5}	—	July 28, 2013	Kitt Peak	Spacewatch	·	1.6 km	MPC · JPL
837563	2013 QE_{6}	—	August 18, 2013	Haleakala	Pan-STARRS 1	H	290 m	MPC · JPL
837564	2013 QP_{7}	—	September 2, 2000	Kitt Peak	Spacewatch	·	590 m	MPC · JPL
837565	2013 QQ_{7}	—	August 26, 2013	Haleakala	Pan-STARRS 1	·	1.1 km	MPC · JPL
837566	2013 QW_{7}	—	March 20, 1999	Sacramento Peak	SDSS	·	1.3 km	MPC · JPL
837567	2013 QF_{12}	—	February 13, 2010	WISE	WISE	·	1.6 km	MPC · JPL
837568	2013 QT_{13}	—	August 17, 2013	Haleakala	Pan-STARRS 1	·	600 m	MPC · JPL
837569	2013 QM_{16}	—	August 29, 2005	Kitt Peak	Spacewatch	·	520 m	MPC · JPL
837570	2013 QT_{19}	—	August 26, 2013	Haleakala	Pan-STARRS 1	·	1.8 km	MPC · JPL
837571	2013 QO_{20}	—	August 26, 2013	Haleakala	Pan-STARRS 1	·	1.3 km	MPC · JPL
837572	2013 QU_{31}	—	September 26, 2006	Mount Lemmon	Mount Lemmon Survey	·	480 m	MPC · JPL
837573	2013 QV_{32}	—	August 13, 2013	Kitt Peak	Spacewatch	·	1.1 km	MPC · JPL
837574	2013 QT_{33}	—	August 30, 2013	Haleakala	Pan-STARRS 1	·	2.2 km	MPC · JPL
837575	2013 QC_{34}	—	September 16, 2009	Mount Lemmon	Mount Lemmon Survey	·	510 m	MPC · JPL
837576	2013 QH_{38}	—	August 28, 2013	Mount Lemmon	Mount Lemmon Survey	·	900 m	MPC · JPL
837577	2013 QF_{43}	—	April 5, 2008	Mount Lemmon	Mount Lemmon Survey	·	640 m	MPC · JPL
837578	2013 QX_{43}	—	August 12, 2013	Haleakala	Pan-STARRS 1	·	1.3 km	MPC · JPL
837579	2013 QL_{49}	—	November 10, 2010	Mount Lemmon	Mount Lemmon Survey	·	460 m	MPC · JPL
837580	2013 QP_{54}	—	August 26, 2013	Haleakala	Pan-STARRS 1	·	530 m	MPC · JPL
837581	2013 QS_{60}	—	October 13, 2010	Mount Lemmon	Mount Lemmon Survey	·	480 m	MPC · JPL
837582	2013 QT_{60}	—	August 9, 2013	Kitt Peak	Spacewatch	·	780 m	MPC · JPL
837583	2013 QU_{60}	—	August 10, 2013	Kitt Peak	Spacewatch	·	2.5 km	MPC · JPL
837584	2013 QK_{63}	—	October 19, 2006	Mount Lemmon	Mount Lemmon Survey	MAS	580 m	MPC · JPL
837585	2013 QA_{65}	—	August 14, 2013	Haleakala	Pan-STARRS 1	·	1.8 km	MPC · JPL
837586	2013 QA_{66}	—	January 27, 2004	Kitt Peak	Spacewatch	·	4.1 km	MPC · JPL
837587	2013 QS_{66}	—	August 12, 2013	Haleakala	Pan-STARRS 1	·	780 m	MPC · JPL
837588	2013 QX_{70}	—	August 9, 2013	Kitt Peak	Spacewatch	·	2.6 km	MPC · JPL
837589	2013 QT_{72}	—	August 26, 2013	Haleakala	Pan-STARRS 1	NYS	860 m	MPC · JPL
837590	2013 QV_{77}	—	October 18, 2003	Kitt Peak	Spacewatch	·	1.2 km	MPC · JPL
837591	2013 QW_{80}	—	August 29, 2013	Haleakala	Pan-STARRS 1	·	920 m	MPC · JPL
837592	2013 QJ_{82}	—	August 28, 2013	Calar Alto	F. Hormuth	·	620 m	MPC · JPL
837593	2013 QL_{82}	—	August 28, 2006	Kitt Peak	Spacewatch	·	590 m	MPC · JPL
837594	2013 QU_{82}	—	July 12, 2002	Palomar	NEAT	·	2.4 km	MPC · JPL
837595	2013 QX_{82}	—	August 9, 2013	Haleakala	Pan-STARRS 1	·	980 m	MPC · JPL
837596	2013 QE_{88}	—	August 8, 2013	Kitt Peak	Spacewatch	V	380 m	MPC · JPL
837597	2013 QW_{88}	—	August 12, 2013	Haleakala	Pan-STARRS 1	·	480 m	MPC · JPL
837598	2013 QG_{95}	—	October 11, 2002	Powell	Observatory, Powell	·	2.7 km	MPC · JPL
837599	2013 QL_{96}	—	August 30, 2013	Haleakala	Pan-STARRS 1	·	1.0 km	MPC · JPL
837600	2013 QO_{96}	—	August 27, 2013	Haleakala	Pan-STARRS 1	·	780 m	MPC · JPL

== 837601–837700 ==
back to top

Designation			Discovery			Properties		Ref
Permanent	Provisional	Named after	Date	Site	Discoverer(s)	Category	Diam.	Ref
837601	2013 QR_{96}	—	August 26, 2013	Haleakala	Pan-STARRS 1	·	830 m	MPC · JPL
837602	2013 QD_{100}	—	August 30, 2013	Haleakala	Pan-STARRS 1	·	1.8 km	MPC · JPL
837603	2013 QU_{100}	—	August 31, 2013	Haleakala	Pan-STARRS 1	·	790 m	MPC · JPL
837604	2013 QU_{104}	—	August 28, 2013	Mount Lemmon	Mount Lemmon Survey	·	890 m	MPC · JPL
837605	2013 QE_{106}	—	August 29, 2013	Haleakala	Pan-STARRS 1	EUN	750 m	MPC · JPL
837606	2013 RU	—	January 31, 2012	Catalina	CSS	H	430 m	MPC · JPL
837607	2013 RN_{2}	—	September 1, 2013	Mount Lemmon	Mount Lemmon Survey	NYS	830 m	MPC · JPL
837608	2013 RT_{4}	—	September 2, 2013	Mount Lemmon	Mount Lemmon Survey	·	480 m	MPC · JPL
837609	2013 RL_{5}	—	October 5, 2002	Sacramento Peak	SDSS	EOS	1.6 km	MPC · JPL
837610	2013 RE_{6}	—	September 2, 2013	Haleakala	Pan-STARRS 1	APO	180 m	MPC · JPL
837611	2013 RC_{7}	—	April 4, 2008	Kitt Peak	Spacewatch	·	970 m	MPC · JPL
837612	2013 RX_{8}	—	September 2, 2013	Haleakala	Pan-STARRS 1	·	760 m	MPC · JPL
837613	2013 RQ_{10}	—	August 15, 2013	Haleakala	Pan-STARRS 1	·	2.2 km	MPC · JPL
837614	2013 RV_{11}	—	September 2, 2013	Mount Lemmon	Mount Lemmon Survey	·	710 m	MPC · JPL
837615	2013 RF_{13}	—	September 2, 2013	Mount Lemmon	Mount Lemmon Survey	·	1.2 km	MPC · JPL
837616	2013 RW_{13}	—	May 15, 2010	WISE	WISE	·	2.4 km	MPC · JPL
837617	2013 RN_{25}	—	September 1, 2013	Mount Lemmon	Mount Lemmon Survey	TIR	2.2 km	MPC · JPL
837618	2013 RT_{26}	—	September 4, 2013	Calar Alto	F. Hormuth	EOS	1.4 km	MPC · JPL
837619	2013 RD_{34}	—	August 15, 2013	Haleakala	Pan-STARRS 1	·	770 m	MPC · JPL
837620	2013 RD_{35}	—	October 5, 2002	Sacramento Peak	SDSS	·	3.8 km	MPC · JPL
837621	2013 RD_{48}	—	April 26, 2010	WISE	WISE	·	3.1 km	MPC · JPL
837622	2013 RD_{49}	—	August 19, 2006	Kitt Peak	Spacewatch	·	430 m	MPC · JPL
837623	2013 RZ_{49}	—	September 10, 2013	Haleakala	Pan-STARRS 1	EOS	1.3 km	MPC · JPL
837624	2013 RN_{58}	—	September 3, 2013	Calar Alto	F. Hormuth	·	840 m	MPC · JPL
837625	2013 RD_{71}	—	August 31, 2013	Piszkés-tető	K. Sárneczky, S. Kürti	·	1.8 km	MPC · JPL
837626	2013 RP_{73}	—	September 12, 2013	Mount Lemmon	Mount Lemmon Survey	·	710 m	MPC · JPL
837627	2013 RG_{76}	—	September 3, 2013	Haleakala	Pan-STARRS 1	·	1.3 km	MPC · JPL
837628	2013 RF_{77}	—	April 2, 2010	WISE	WISE	·	2.8 km	MPC · JPL
837629	2013 RZ_{77}	—	May 2, 2010	WISE	WISE	·	2.6 km	MPC · JPL
837630	2013 RT_{88}	—	September 14, 2013	Kitt Peak	Spacewatch	·	1.4 km	MPC · JPL
837631	2013 RQ_{90}	—	September 2, 2013	Catalina	CSS	·	1.1 km	MPC · JPL
837632	2013 RG_{91}	—	September 14, 2013	Kitt Peak	Spacewatch	·	750 m	MPC · JPL
837633	2013 RV_{95}	—	September 10, 2013	Calar Alto	S. Hellmich, S. Mottola	·	1.3 km	MPC · JPL
837634	2013 RS_{98}	—	September 1, 2013	Mount Lemmon	Mount Lemmon Survey	H	340 m	MPC · JPL
837635	2013 RE_{99}	—	September 14, 2013	Haleakala	Pan-STARRS 1	H	410 m	MPC · JPL
837636	2013 RG_{100}	—	September 6, 2013	Mount Lemmon	Mount Lemmon Survey	·	710 m	MPC · JPL
837637	2013 RX_{101}	—	September 13, 2013	Mount Lemmon	Mount Lemmon Survey	·	500 m	MPC · JPL
837638	2013 RT_{102}	—	August 8, 2013	Kitt Peak	Spacewatch	·	630 m	MPC · JPL
837639	2013 RS_{110}	—	September 12, 2013	Mount Lemmon	Mount Lemmon Survey	·	820 m	MPC · JPL
837640	2013 RV_{110}	—	January 29, 2015	Haleakala	Pan-STARRS 1	·	810 m	MPC · JPL
837641	2013 RN_{112}	—	September 14, 2013	Haleakala	Pan-STARRS 1	·	690 m	MPC · JPL
837642	2013 RV_{113}	—	September 5, 2013	Kitt Peak	Spacewatch	MAR	660 m	MPC · JPL
837643	2013 RK_{114}	—	September 12, 2013	Mount Lemmon	Mount Lemmon Survey	JUN	670 m	MPC · JPL
837644	2013 RB_{116}	—	September 14, 2013	Haleakala	Pan-STARRS 1	·	660 m	MPC · JPL
837645	2013 RW_{116}	—	September 6, 2013	Kitt Peak	Spacewatch	MAR	630 m	MPC · JPL
837646	2013 RE_{117}	—	September 15, 2013	Mount Lemmon	Mount Lemmon Survey	EUN	720 m	MPC · JPL
837647	2013 RG_{117}	—	September 1, 2013	Catalina	CSS	JUN	820 m	MPC · JPL
837648	2013 RP_{119}	—	September 9, 2013	Haleakala	Pan-STARRS 1	·	2.4 km	MPC · JPL
837649	2013 RQ_{120}	—	January 16, 2010	WISE	WISE	·	1.0 km	MPC · JPL
837650	2013 RS_{120}	—	September 9, 2013	Haleakala	Pan-STARRS 1	·	1.2 km	MPC · JPL
837651	2013 RU_{120}	—	November 21, 2014	Haleakala	Pan-STARRS 1	·	1.8 km	MPC · JPL
837652	2013 RD_{121}	—	April 1, 2017	Haleakala	Pan-STARRS 1	·	1.3 km	MPC · JPL
837653	2013 RE_{123}	—	August 30, 2013	La Sagra	OAM	·	560 m	MPC · JPL
837654	2013 RQ_{125}	—	September 9, 2013	Haleakala	Pan-STARRS 1	·	960 m	MPC · JPL
837655	2013 RK_{127}	—	September 14, 2013	Haleakala	Pan-STARRS 1	·	2.0 km	MPC · JPL
837656	2013 RE_{129}	—	September 14, 2013	Haleakala	Pan-STARRS 1	·	2.1 km	MPC · JPL
837657	2013 RP_{131}	—	September 6, 2013	Mount Lemmon	Mount Lemmon Survey	NYS	800 m	MPC · JPL
837658	2013 RV_{131}	—	September 3, 2013	Kitt Peak	Spacewatch	·	1.1 km	MPC · JPL
837659	2013 RD_{132}	—	September 15, 2013	Mount Lemmon	Mount Lemmon Survey	·	1.5 km	MPC · JPL
837660	2013 RV_{132}	—	September 14, 2013	Haleakala	Pan-STARRS 1	·	2.8 km	MPC · JPL
837661	2013 RS_{133}	—	August 14, 2013	Haleakala	Pan-STARRS 1	·	960 m	MPC · JPL
837662	2013 RE_{135}	—	September 12, 2013	Mount Lemmon	Mount Lemmon Survey	·	870 m	MPC · JPL
837663	2013 RG_{136}	—	September 5, 2013	Haleakala	Pan-STARRS 1	·	790 m	MPC · JPL
837664	2013 RR_{143}	—	September 15, 2013	Mount Lemmon	Mount Lemmon Survey	KOR	950 m	MPC · JPL
837665	2013 RM_{145}	—	September 4, 2013	Mount Lemmon	Mount Lemmon Survey	·	1.4 km	MPC · JPL
837666	2013 RR_{145}	—	September 13, 2013	Kitt Peak	Spacewatch	NYS	620 m	MPC · JPL
837667	2013 RL_{147}	—	September 15, 2013	Mount Lemmon	Mount Lemmon Survey	NYS	590 m	MPC · JPL
837668	2013 RQ_{147}	—	September 10, 2013	Haleakala	Pan-STARRS 1	·	500 m	MPC · JPL
837669	2013 RP_{151}	—	September 3, 2013	Haleakala	Pan-STARRS 1	·	900 m	MPC · JPL
837670	2013 RT_{151}	—	September 6, 2013	Kitt Peak	Spacewatch	·	1.7 km	MPC · JPL
837671	2013 RG_{154}	—	September 2, 2013	Mount Lemmon	Mount Lemmon Survey	·	660 m	MPC · JPL
837672	2013 RW_{160}	—	September 13, 2013	Mount Lemmon	Mount Lemmon Survey	·	1.7 km	MPC · JPL
837673	2013 RF_{161}	—	September 6, 2013	Mount Lemmon	Mount Lemmon Survey	·	750 m	MPC · JPL
837674	2013 RX_{171}	—	September 6, 2013	Mount Lemmon	Mount Lemmon Survey	·	1.4 km	MPC · JPL
837675	2013 RA_{188}	—	July 23, 2009	Siding Spring	SSS	·	950 m	MPC · JPL
837676	2013 RU_{190}	—	September 7, 2013	Calar Alto	S. Hellmich, S. Mottola	·	2.4 km	MPC · JPL
837677	2013 SA_{8}	—	December 20, 2009	Mount Lemmon	Mount Lemmon Survey	KON	2.1 km	MPC · JPL
837678	2013 SP_{9}	—	February 22, 2009	Kitt Peak	Spacewatch	PHO	580 m	MPC · JPL
837679	2013 ST_{11}	—	August 15, 2013	Haleakala	Pan-STARRS 1	·	920 m	MPC · JPL
837680	2013 SK_{15}	—	September 10, 2013	Haleakala	Pan-STARRS 1	RAF	720 m	MPC · JPL
837681	2013 SH_{16}	—	August 29, 2013	Haleakala	Pan-STARRS 1	H	390 m	MPC · JPL
837682	2013 SD_{18}	—	April 4, 2011	Mount Lemmon	Mount Lemmon Survey	·	3.0 km	MPC · JPL
837683	2013 SS_{19}	—	September 24, 2013	Mount Lemmon	Mount Lemmon Survey	APO	210 m	MPC · JPL
837684	2013 ST_{34}	—	September 9, 2013	Haleakala	Pan-STARRS 1	·	780 m	MPC · JPL
837685	2013 SE_{37}	—	October 30, 2002	Sacramento Peak	SDSS	HYG	2.3 km	MPC · JPL
837686	2013 SK_{37}	—	September 2, 2013	Mount Lemmon	Mount Lemmon Survey	·	810 m	MPC · JPL
837687	2013 SY_{38}	—	October 22, 2009	Mount Lemmon	Mount Lemmon Survey	·	690 m	MPC · JPL
837688	2013 SF_{53}	—	September 9, 2013	Haleakala	Pan-STARRS 1	·	780 m	MPC · JPL
837689	2013 ST_{55}	—	September 17, 2009	Kitt Peak	Spacewatch	·	840 m	MPC · JPL
837690	2013 SX_{55}	—	September 29, 2013	Haleakala	Pan-STARRS 1	EOS	1.4 km	MPC · JPL
837691	2013 SY_{57}	—	September 30, 2013	Palomar	Palomar Transient Factory	·	2.2 km	MPC · JPL
837692	2013 SH_{59}	—	October 31, 2008	Mount Lemmon	Mount Lemmon Survey	·	1.5 km	MPC · JPL
837693	2013 SG_{62}	—	October 5, 2002	Sacramento Peak	SDSS	·	2.2 km	MPC · JPL
837694	2013 SF_{67}	—	March 8, 2008	Mount Lemmon	Mount Lemmon Survey	·	840 m	MPC · JPL
837695	2013 SF_{69}	—	September 24, 2013	Mount Lemmon	Mount Lemmon Survey	·	1.1 km	MPC · JPL
837696	2013 SF_{70}	—	October 5, 2002	Sacramento Peak	SDSS	THM	1.9 km	MPC · JPL
837697	2013 SU_{73}	—	September 1, 2013	Mount Lemmon	Mount Lemmon Survey	EOS	1.3 km	MPC · JPL
837698	2013 SX_{74}	—	October 14, 2001	Sacramento Peak	SDSS	·	700 m	MPC · JPL
837699	2013 SB_{80}	—	September 29, 2013	Mount Lemmon	Mount Lemmon Survey	L5	7.1 km	MPC · JPL
837700	2013 ST_{85}	—	October 3, 2013	Palomar	Palomar Transient Factory	·	1.2 km	MPC · JPL

== 837701–837800 ==
back to top

Designation			Discovery			Properties		Ref
Permanent	Provisional	Named after	Date	Site	Discoverer(s)	Category	Diam.	Ref
837701	2013 SS_{87}	—	February 5, 2011	Haleakala	Pan-STARRS 1	·	1.1 km	MPC · JPL
837702	2013 SX_{88}	—	February 27, 2012	Haleakala	Pan-STARRS 1	·	1.0 km	MPC · JPL
837703	2013 SC_{90}	—	October 21, 2008	Kitt Peak	Spacewatch	EOS	1.3 km	MPC · JPL
837704	2013 SG_{99}	—	October 4, 2013	Haleakala	Pan-STARRS 1	L5	5.9 km	MPC · JPL
837705	2013 SN_{101}	—	January 18, 2009	Kitt Peak	Spacewatch	·	2.2 km	MPC · JPL
837706	2013 SK_{103}	—	September 17, 2013	Mount Lemmon	Mount Lemmon Survey	·	750 m	MPC · JPL
837707	2013 SE_{104}	—	September 25, 2013	Mount Lemmon	Mount Lemmon Survey	MAS	580 m	MPC · JPL
837708	2013 SV_{105}	—	December 16, 2009	Mount Lemmon	Mount Lemmon Survey	·	2.5 km	MPC · JPL
837709	2013 SQ_{106}	—	June 13, 2018	Haleakala	Pan-STARRS 1	·	2.4 km	MPC · JPL
837710	2013 ST_{106}	—	November 27, 2014	Haleakala	Pan-STARRS 1	·	2.0 km	MPC · JPL
837711	2013 SE_{107}	—	September 28, 2013	Mount Lemmon	Mount Lemmon Survey	·	2.0 km	MPC · JPL
837712	2013 SF_{107}	—	September 16, 2013	Mount Lemmon	Mount Lemmon Survey	EUN	790 m	MPC · JPL
837713	2013 SV_{107}	—	September 25, 2013	Mount Lemmon	Mount Lemmon Survey	·	1.9 km	MPC · JPL
837714	2013 SW_{107}	—	September 17, 2013	Mount Lemmon	Mount Lemmon Survey	·	1.0 km	MPC · JPL
837715	2013 SC_{108}	—	September 25, 2013	Mount Lemmon	Mount Lemmon Survey	·	1.5 km	MPC · JPL
837716	2013 SB_{115}	—	September 24, 2013	Mount Lemmon	Mount Lemmon Survey	·	1.2 km	MPC · JPL
837717	2013 TH_{12}	—	October 5, 2013	Oukaïmeden	C. Rinner	(5)	900 m	MPC · JPL
837718	2013 TY_{20}	—	October 1, 2013	Mount Lemmon	Mount Lemmon Survey	H	450 m	MPC · JPL
837719	2013 TZ_{28}	—	September 6, 2013	Kitt Peak	Spacewatch	·	1.8 km	MPC · JPL
837720	2013 TM_{29}	—	September 22, 2009	Mount Lemmon	Mount Lemmon Survey	·	840 m	MPC · JPL
837721	2013 TS_{29}	—	January 12, 1996	Mount Ontake	Sato, I.	·	2.0 km	MPC · JPL
837722	2013 TU_{32}	—	November 5, 1999	Kitt Peak	Spacewatch	·	1.7 km	MPC · JPL
837723	2013 TE_{40}	—	October 2, 2013	Mount Lemmon	Mount Lemmon Survey	·	1.4 km	MPC · JPL
837724	2013 TH_{40}	—	October 2, 2013	Mount Lemmon	Mount Lemmon Survey	·	1.3 km	MPC · JPL
837725	2013 TQ_{48}	—	January 8, 2009	Kitt Peak	Spacewatch	·	2.4 km	MPC · JPL
837726	2013 TO_{51}	—	September 14, 2007	Kitt Peak	Spacewatch	·	2.2 km	MPC · JPL
837727	2013 TH_{52}	—	August 28, 2009	La Sagra	OAM	PHO	860 m	MPC · JPL
837728	2013 TJ_{52}	—	October 4, 2013	Kitt Peak	Spacewatch	·	740 m	MPC · JPL
837729	2013 TH_{59}	—	October 4, 2013	Mount Lemmon	Mount Lemmon Survey	MAR	700 m	MPC · JPL
837730	2013 TN_{61}	—	October 4, 2013	Mount Lemmon	Mount Lemmon Survey	·	2.1 km	MPC · JPL
837731	2013 TZ_{61}	—	October 4, 2013	Mount Lemmon	Mount Lemmon Survey	H	320 m	MPC · JPL
837732	2013 TB_{63}	—	October 4, 2013	Mount Lemmon	Mount Lemmon Survey	·	1.3 km	MPC · JPL
837733	2013 TE_{63}	—	October 4, 2013	Mount Lemmon	Mount Lemmon Survey	·	460 m	MPC · JPL
837734	2013 TB_{69}	—	October 5, 2013	Haleakala	Pan-STARRS 1	·	680 m	MPC · JPL
837735	2013 TV_{70}	—	December 21, 2006	Kitt Peak	Spacewatch	·	770 m	MPC · JPL
837736	2013 TE_{74}	—	September 14, 2007	Catalina	CSS	T_{j} (2.95)	3.2 km	MPC · JPL
837737	2013 TE_{75}	—	October 13, 2006	Kitt Peak	Spacewatch	·	480 m	MPC · JPL
837738	2013 TD_{78}	—	October 3, 2013	Kitt Peak	Spacewatch	(5)	730 m	MPC · JPL
837739	2013 TV_{80}	—	September 4, 2013	Mount Lemmon	Mount Lemmon Survey	·	2.6 km	MPC · JPL
837740	2013 TH_{88}	—	September 22, 2009	Mount Lemmon	Mount Lemmon Survey	·	750 m	MPC · JPL
837741	2013 TS_{93}	—	October 1, 2013	Kitt Peak	Spacewatch	·	2.1 km	MPC · JPL
837742	2013 TV_{97}	—	September 20, 2008	Mount Lemmon	Mount Lemmon Survey	·	1.0 km	MPC · JPL
837743	2013 TP_{100}	—	October 2, 2013	Mount Lemmon	Mount Lemmon Survey	THM	1.4 km	MPC · JPL
837744	2013 TS_{102}	—	October 2, 2013	Mount Lemmon	Mount Lemmon Survey	·	2.3 km	MPC · JPL
837745	2013 TJ_{104}	—	February 24, 2001	Cerro Tololo	Deep Lens Survey	·	640 m	MPC · JPL
837746	2013 TY_{104}	—	September 14, 2013	Haleakala	Pan-STARRS 1	T_{j} (2.98)	2.5 km	MPC · JPL
837747	2013 TV_{109}	—	November 17, 2009	Kitt Peak	Spacewatch	·	1.2 km	MPC · JPL
837748	2013 TS_{113}	—	March 21, 1993	La Silla	UESAC	TIR	3.8 km	MPC · JPL
837749	2013 TW_{115}	—	October 4, 2013	Mount Lemmon	Mount Lemmon Survey	·	1.1 km	MPC · JPL
837750	2013 TU_{117}	—	October 4, 2013	Mount Lemmon	Mount Lemmon Survey	·	2.2 km	MPC · JPL
837751	2013 TG_{125}	—	October 5, 2013	Haleakala	Pan-STARRS 1	NYS	570 m	MPC · JPL
837752	2013 TO_{140}	—	September 15, 2013	Kitt Peak	Spacewatch	·	570 m	MPC · JPL
837753	2013 TS_{142}	—	September 17, 2013	Mount Lemmon	Mount Lemmon Survey	(5)	630 m	MPC · JPL
837754	2013 TX_{143}	—	October 5, 2002	Sacramento Peak	SDSS	EOS	1.4 km	MPC · JPL
837755	2013 TS_{156}	—	July 26, 2006	Siding Spring	SSS	·	520 m	MPC · JPL
837756	2013 TL_{157}	—	August 31, 2005	Kitt Peak	Spacewatch	·	920 m	MPC · JPL
837757	2013 TY_{159}	—	October 3, 2013	Haleakala	Pan-STARRS 1	H	460 m	MPC · JPL
837758	2013 TC_{161}	—	October 5, 2013	Kitt Peak	Spacewatch	·	1.5 km	MPC · JPL
837759	2013 TS_{161}	—	October 15, 2004	Mount Lemmon	Mount Lemmon Survey	·	1.4 km	MPC · JPL
837760	2013 TL_{164}	—	November 8, 2009	Mount Lemmon	Mount Lemmon Survey	(5)	680 m	MPC · JPL
837761	2013 TG_{165}	—	December 4, 2008	Kitt Peak	Spacewatch	·	1.4 km	MPC · JPL
837762	2013 TJ_{166}	—	October 2, 2013	Haleakala	Pan-STARRS 1	·	1.8 km	MPC · JPL
837763	2013 TE_{173}	—	March 19, 2010	WISE	WISE	ADE	1.4 km	MPC · JPL
837764	2013 TM_{173}	—	October 10, 1996	Kitt Peak	Spacewatch	·	880 m	MPC · JPL
837765	2013 TU_{173}	—	October 5, 2013	Kitt Peak	Spacewatch	·	730 m	MPC · JPL
837766	2013 TA_{174}	—	October 2, 2013	Kitt Peak	Spacewatch	·	600 m	MPC · JPL
837767	2013 TJ_{174}	—	October 13, 2013	Kitt Peak	Spacewatch	·	780 m	MPC · JPL
837768	2013 TO_{174}	—	October 3, 2013	Haleakala	Pan-STARRS 1	·	830 m	MPC · JPL
837769	2013 TU_{174}	—	October 18, 2009	Mount Lemmon	Mount Lemmon Survey	·	450 m	MPC · JPL
837770	2013 TY_{175}	—	October 3, 2013	Kitt Peak	Spacewatch	·	880 m	MPC · JPL
837771	2013 TZ_{175}	—	October 1, 2013	Kitt Peak	Spacewatch	·	590 m	MPC · JPL
837772	2013 TP_{178}	—	October 8, 2013	Mount Lemmon	Mount Lemmon Survey	·	800 m	MPC · JPL
837773	2013 TS_{178}	—	October 5, 2013	Haleakala	Pan-STARRS 1	HNS	910 m	MPC · JPL
837774	2013 TH_{179}	—	October 5, 2013	Haleakala	Pan-STARRS 1	·	2.2 km	MPC · JPL
837775	2013 TA_{180}	—	October 5, 2013	Haleakala	Pan-STARRS 1	·	1.1 km	MPC · JPL
837776	2013 TD_{180}	—	October 5, 2013	Haleakala	Pan-STARRS 1	·	2.3 km	MPC · JPL
837777	2013 TE_{182}	—	October 2, 2013	Haleakala	Pan-STARRS 1	·	2.7 km	MPC · JPL
837778	2013 TW_{182}	—	October 5, 2013	Kitt Peak	Spacewatch	·	1.3 km	MPC · JPL
837779	2013 TN_{183}	—	October 3, 2013	Haleakala	Pan-STARRS 1	·	2.1 km	MPC · JPL
837780	2013 TS_{183}	—	December 26, 2014	Haleakala	Pan-STARRS 1	·	2.1 km	MPC · JPL
837781	2013 TD_{184}	—	November 21, 2009	Kitt Peak	Spacewatch	EUP	3.7 km	MPC · JPL
837782	2013 TJ_{184}	—	February 10, 2015	Mount Lemmon	Mount Lemmon Survey	·	580 m	MPC · JPL
837783	2013 TZ_{184}	—	October 3, 2013	Haleakala	Pan-STARRS 1	LIX	2.3 km	MPC · JPL
837784	2013 TH_{185}	—	November 20, 2008	Mount Lemmon	Mount Lemmon Survey	·	1.7 km	MPC · JPL
837785	2013 TO_{188}	—	October 12, 2013	Kitt Peak	Spacewatch	·	900 m	MPC · JPL
837786	2013 TE_{190}	—	October 5, 2013	Haleakala	Pan-STARRS 1	NEM	1.3 km	MPC · JPL
837787	2013 TR_{190}	—	November 21, 2008	Kitt Peak	Spacewatch	·	1.9 km	MPC · JPL
837788	2013 TX_{190}	—	October 2, 2013	Haleakala	Pan-STARRS 1	·	1.2 km	MPC · JPL
837789	2013 TM_{191}	—	October 13, 2013	Calar Alto	S. Hellmich, G. Proffe	·	2.3 km	MPC · JPL
837790	2013 TV_{192}	—	October 1, 2013	Mount Lemmon	Mount Lemmon Survey	THM	1.6 km	MPC · JPL
837791	2013 TO_{193}	—	November 19, 2008	Kitt Peak	Spacewatch	·	2.0 km	MPC · JPL
837792	2013 TG_{194}	—	October 5, 2013	Haleakala	Pan-STARRS 1	·	890 m	MPC · JPL
837793	2013 TN_{194}	—	October 3, 2013	Haleakala	Pan-STARRS 1	·	2.1 km	MPC · JPL
837794	2013 TF_{195}	—	October 12, 2013	Kitt Peak	Spacewatch	·	2.7 km	MPC · JPL
837795	2013 TP_{196}	—	October 2, 2013	Kitt Peak	Spacewatch	·	530 m	MPC · JPL
837796	2013 TS_{196}	—	October 4, 2013	Mount Lemmon	Mount Lemmon Survey	·	1.7 km	MPC · JPL
837797	2013 TC_{197}	—	October 3, 2013	Haleakala	Pan-STARRS 1	·	1.8 km	MPC · JPL
837798	2013 TJ_{197}	—	October 14, 2013	Kitt Peak	Spacewatch	·	1.6 km	MPC · JPL
837799	2013 TX_{200}	—	October 1, 2013	Kitt Peak	Spacewatch	L5	7.5 km	MPC · JPL
837800	2013 TA_{201}	—	October 3, 2013	Haleakala	Pan-STARRS 1	·	1.3 km	MPC · JPL

== 837801–837900 ==
back to top

Designation			Discovery			Properties		Ref
Permanent	Provisional	Named after	Date	Site	Discoverer(s)	Category	Diam.	Ref
837801	2013 TJ_{201}	—	October 5, 2013	Mount Lemmon	Mount Lemmon Survey	MAR	750 m	MPC · JPL
837802	2013 TQ_{201}	—	October 30, 2002	Sacramento Peak	SDSS	·	800 m	MPC · JPL
837803	2013 TA_{204}	—	October 3, 2013	Haleakala	Pan-STARRS 1	·	820 m	MPC · JPL
837804	2013 TG_{210}	—	October 3, 2013	Mount Lemmon	Mount Lemmon Survey	THM	1.8 km	MPC · JPL
837805	2013 TH_{210}	—	October 4, 2013	Mount Lemmon	Mount Lemmon Survey	VER	2.0 km	MPC · JPL
837806	2013 TH_{211}	—	October 3, 2013	Haleakala	Pan-STARRS 1	·	530 m	MPC · JPL
837807	2013 TW_{211}	—	October 14, 2013	Mount Lemmon	Mount Lemmon Survey	·	560 m	MPC · JPL
837808	2013 TZ_{211}	—	October 14, 2013	Mount Lemmon	Mount Lemmon Survey	MAS	420 m	MPC · JPL
837809	2013 TG_{212}	—	October 3, 2013	Haleakala	Pan-STARRS 1	H	380 m	MPC · JPL
837810	2013 TS_{218}	—	October 2, 2013	Mount Lemmon	Mount Lemmon Survey	HOF	1.6 km	MPC · JPL
837811	2013 TZ_{218}	—	October 9, 2013	Mount Lemmon	Mount Lemmon Survey	L5	6.4 km	MPC · JPL
837812	2013 TZ_{219}	—	October 5, 2013	Haleakala	Pan-STARRS 1	·	2.9 km	MPC · JPL
837813	2013 TC_{220}	—	October 14, 2013	Kitt Peak	Spacewatch	·	430 m	MPC · JPL
837814	2013 TG_{224}	—	October 11, 2013	Catalina	CSS	EUN	900 m	MPC · JPL
837815	2013 TP_{224}	—	October 3, 2013	Kitt Peak	Spacewatch	·	830 m	MPC · JPL
837816	2013 TB_{226}	—	October 8, 2013	Palomar	Palomar Transient Factory	·	1.9 km	MPC · JPL
837817	2013 TD_{227}	—	October 5, 2013	Haleakala	Pan-STARRS 1	·	390 m	MPC · JPL
837818	2013 TY_{229}	—	October 5, 2013	Haleakala	Pan-STARRS 1	EUN	620 m	MPC · JPL
837819	2013 TT_{230}	—	October 5, 2013	Haleakala	Pan-STARRS 1	·	700 m	MPC · JPL
837820	2013 TU_{230}	—	October 9, 2013	Mount Lemmon	Mount Lemmon Survey	·	750 m	MPC · JPL
837821	2013 TJ_{233}	—	October 9, 2013	Mount Lemmon	Mount Lemmon Survey	·	490 m	MPC · JPL
837822	2013 TO_{233}	—	October 2, 2013	Mount Lemmon	Mount Lemmon Survey	·	980 m	MPC · JPL
837823	2013 TQ_{233}	—	October 3, 2013	Haleakala	Pan-STARRS 1	MRX	820 m	MPC · JPL
837824	2013 TU_{234}	—	October 6, 2013	Kitt Peak	Spacewatch	·	820 m	MPC · JPL
837825	2013 TL_{242}	—	October 13, 2013	Mount Lemmon	Mount Lemmon Survey	·	1.2 km	MPC · JPL
837826	2013 TV_{244}	—	October 6, 2013	Oukaïmeden	C. Rinner	MAR	680 m	MPC · JPL
837827	2013 TY_{246}	—	October 4, 2013	Mount Lemmon	Mount Lemmon Survey	·	1.0 km	MPC · JPL
837828	2013 TT_{248}	—	October 1, 2013	Kitt Peak	Spacewatch	·	1.9 km	MPC · JPL
837829	2013 TF_{281}	—	October 12, 2013	Mount Lemmon	Mount Lemmon Survey	·	1.9 km	MPC · JPL
837830	2013 TX_{285}	—	October 4, 2013	Mount Lemmon	Mount Lemmon Survey	·	1.3 km	MPC · JPL
837831	2013 US_{2}	—	October 24, 2013	Elena Remote	Oreshko, A.	H	400 m	MPC · JPL
837832	2013 UQ_{9}	—	October 6, 2013	Les Engarouines	L. Bernasconi	·	1.5 km	MPC · JPL
837833	2013 UA_{12}	—	October 24, 2013	Kitt Peak	Spacewatch	·	2.4 km	MPC · JPL
837834	2013 UO_{19}	—	September 4, 2008	Kitt Peak	Spacewatch	AEO	710 m	MPC · JPL
837835	2013 UC_{20}	—	October 24, 2013	Mount Lemmon	Mount Lemmon Survey	·	2.2 km	MPC · JPL
837836	2013 UB_{23}	—	October 30, 2013	Haleakala	Pan-STARRS 1	(5)	740 m	MPC · JPL
837837	2013 UN_{23}	—	October 31, 2013	Piszkéstető	K. Sárneczky	·	800 m	MPC · JPL
837838	2013 UQ_{23}	—	October 26, 2013	Mount Lemmon	Mount Lemmon Survey	(5)	860 m	MPC · JPL
837839	2013 UM_{24}	—	October 28, 2013	Kitt Peak	Spacewatch	·	570 m	MPC · JPL
837840	2013 UY_{24}	—	October 24, 2013	Mount Lemmon	Mount Lemmon Survey	·	690 m	MPC · JPL
837841	2013 UJ_{25}	—	October 28, 2013	Mount Lemmon	Mount Lemmon Survey	·	850 m	MPC · JPL
837842	2013 UT_{27}	—	October 26, 2013	Catalina	CSS	EUN	880 m	MPC · JPL
837843	2013 UM_{28}	—	October 10, 2002	Sacramento Peak	SDSS	·	2.1 km	MPC · JPL
837844	2013 UU_{28}	—	October 25, 2013	Mount Lemmon	Mount Lemmon Survey	·	2.9 km	MPC · JPL
837845	2013 UV_{28}	—	March 13, 2010	WISE	WISE	·	1.1 km	MPC · JPL
837846	2013 UQ_{30}	—	October 26, 2013	Mount Lemmon	Mount Lemmon Survey	·	610 m	MPC · JPL
837847	2013 UM_{31}	—	October 29, 2017	Haleakala	Pan-STARRS 1	·	1.3 km	MPC · JPL
837848	2013 UL_{32}	—	October 25, 2013	Mount Lemmon	Mount Lemmon Survey	·	630 m	MPC · JPL
837849	2013 UL_{33}	—	October 25, 2013	Mount Lemmon	Mount Lemmon Survey	·	650 m	MPC · JPL
837850	2013 UR_{34}	—	October 26, 2013	Mount Lemmon	Mount Lemmon Survey	·	1.2 km	MPC · JPL
837851	2013 UE_{35}	—	October 26, 2013	Mount Lemmon	Mount Lemmon Survey	THM	1.5 km	MPC · JPL
837852	2013 UW_{35}	—	October 26, 2013	Mount Lemmon	Mount Lemmon Survey	·	1.0 km	MPC · JPL
837853	2013 UJ_{36}	—	October 24, 2013	Mount Lemmon	Mount Lemmon Survey	·	860 m	MPC · JPL
837854	2013 UR_{36}	—	October 24, 2013	Mount Lemmon	Mount Lemmon Survey	·	460 m	MPC · JPL
837855	2013 UT_{38}	—	October 23, 2013	Mount Lemmon	Mount Lemmon Survey	MAS	510 m	MPC · JPL
837856	2013 UB_{41}	—	October 23, 2013	Mount Lemmon	Mount Lemmon Survey	·	660 m	MPC · JPL
837857	2013 UC_{43}	—	October 24, 2013	Mount Lemmon	Mount Lemmon Survey	·	450 m	MPC · JPL
837858	2013 UV_{44}	—	July 31, 2000	Cerro Tololo	Deep Ecliptic Survey	(5)	830 m	MPC · JPL
837859	2013 UZ_{44}	—	October 25, 2013	Mount Lemmon	Mount Lemmon Survey	(5)	700 m	MPC · JPL
837860	2013 UB_{46}	—	October 23, 2013	Mount Lemmon	Mount Lemmon Survey	·	2.0 km	MPC · JPL
837861	2013 UB_{48}	—	October 16, 2013	Mount Lemmon	Mount Lemmon Survey	MAR	620 m	MPC · JPL
837862	2013 UE_{48}	—	October 24, 2005	Mauna Kea	A. Boattini	·	1.2 km	MPC · JPL
837863	2013 UA_{49}	—	October 22, 2013	Mount Lemmon	Mount Lemmon Survey	·	2.3 km	MPC · JPL
837864	2013 VM_{9}	—	November 6, 2013	Mount Lemmon	Mount Lemmon Survey	H	280 m	MPC · JPL
837865	2013 VT_{11}	—	November 9, 2013	Haleakala	Pan-STARRS 1	·	800 m	MPC · JPL
837866	2013 VT_{13}	—	November 11, 2013	Catalina	CSS	·	670 m	MPC · JPL
837867	2013 VT_{24}	—	November 2, 2013	Mount Lemmon	Mount Lemmon Survey	·	930 m	MPC · JPL
837868	2013 VD_{33}	—	November 1, 2013	Kitt Peak	Spacewatch	·	750 m	MPC · JPL
837869	2013 VQ_{33}	—	November 9, 2013	Mount Lemmon	Mount Lemmon Survey	·	580 m	MPC · JPL
837870	2013 VD_{34}	—	November 1, 2013	Mount Lemmon	Mount Lemmon Survey	·	910 m	MPC · JPL
837871	2013 VR_{34}	—	October 12, 2017	Mount Lemmon	Mount Lemmon Survey	·	1.2 km	MPC · JPL
837872	2013 VD_{35}	—	November 8, 2013	Catalina	CSS	·	1.0 km	MPC · JPL
837873	2013 VK_{35}	—	November 2, 2013	Mount Lemmon	Mount Lemmon Survey	·	640 m	MPC · JPL
837874	2013 VJ_{36}	—	November 1, 2013	Kitt Peak	Spacewatch	(5)	660 m	MPC · JPL
837875	2013 VG_{37}	—	November 8, 2013	Mount Lemmon	Mount Lemmon Survey	·	850 m	MPC · JPL
837876	2013 VU_{37}	—	November 9, 2013	Haleakala	Pan-STARRS 1	·	540 m	MPC · JPL
837877	2013 VZ_{37}	—	November 9, 2013	Haleakala	Pan-STARRS 1	·	910 m	MPC · JPL
837878	2013 VA_{38}	—	January 15, 2010	WISE	WISE	·	3.1 km	MPC · JPL
837879	2013 VC_{41}	—	January 26, 2010	WISE	WISE	·	2.7 km	MPC · JPL
837880	2013 VQ_{43}	—	November 12, 2013	Mount Lemmon	Mount Lemmon Survey	(5)	780 m	MPC · JPL
837881	2013 VR_{43}	—	October 3, 2013	Mount Lemmon	Mount Lemmon Survey	·	1.8 km	MPC · JPL
837882	2013 VR_{45}	—	November 9, 2013	Haleakala	Pan-STARRS 1	·	2.1 km	MPC · JPL
837883	2013 VF_{46}	—	November 9, 2013	Haleakala	Pan-STARRS 1	·	1.3 km	MPC · JPL
837884	2013 VE_{47}	—	November 9, 2013	Haleakala	Pan-STARRS 1	·	1.2 km	MPC · JPL
837885	2013 VU_{50}	—	November 8, 2013	Mount Lemmon	Mount Lemmon Survey	·	490 m	MPC · JPL
837886	2013 VW_{51}	—	November 1, 2013	Catalina	CSS	H	470 m	MPC · JPL
837887	2013 VQ_{52}	—	November 10, 2013	Mount Lemmon	Mount Lemmon Survey	·	2.4 km	MPC · JPL
837888	2013 VD_{54}	—	November 1, 2013	Mount Lemmon	Mount Lemmon Survey	L5	6.0 km	MPC · JPL
837889	2013 VF_{54}	—	November 6, 2013	Haleakala	Pan-STARRS 1	·	1.8 km	MPC · JPL
837890	2013 VZ_{55}	—	November 1, 2013	Mount Lemmon	Mount Lemmon Survey	EOS	1.6 km	MPC · JPL
837891	2013 VG_{58}	—	November 8, 2013	Mount Lemmon	Mount Lemmon Survey	·	1.0 km	MPC · JPL
837892	2013 VY_{59}	—	November 1, 2013	Mount Lemmon	Mount Lemmon Survey	·	920 m	MPC · JPL
837893	2013 VR_{63}	—	November 14, 2013	Mount Lemmon	Mount Lemmon Survey	·	620 m	MPC · JPL
837894	2013 VS_{63}	—	November 8, 2013	Mount Lemmon	Mount Lemmon Survey	·	920 m	MPC · JPL
837895	2013 VR_{64}	—	November 2, 2013	Mount Lemmon	Mount Lemmon Survey	·	490 m	MPC · JPL
837896	2013 VT_{67}	—	November 1, 2013	Mount Lemmon	Mount Lemmon Survey	·	950 m	MPC · JPL
837897	2013 VZ_{67}	—	November 4, 2013	Mount Lemmon	Mount Lemmon Survey	LIX	2.4 km	MPC · JPL
837898	2013 VF_{68}	—	November 14, 2013	Mount Lemmon	Mount Lemmon Survey	·	670 m	MPC · JPL
837899	2013 VN_{69}	—	November 10, 2013	Mount Lemmon	Mount Lemmon Survey	·	2.7 km	MPC · JPL
837900	2013 VW_{72}	—	November 1, 2013	Mount Lemmon	Mount Lemmon Survey	MAR	630 m	MPC · JPL

== 837901–838000 ==
back to top

Designation			Discovery			Properties		Ref
Permanent	Provisional	Named after	Date	Site	Discoverer(s)	Category	Diam.	Ref
837901	2013 VQ_{73}	—	November 8, 2013	Mount Lemmon	Mount Lemmon Survey	·	690 m	MPC · JPL
837902	2013 VY_{74}	—	November 12, 2013	Mount Lemmon	Mount Lemmon Survey	·	2.3 km	MPC · JPL
837903	2013 VH_{75}	—	November 11, 2013	Kitt Peak	Spacewatch	·	1.1 km	MPC · JPL
837904	2013 VH_{76}	—	January 8, 2010	WISE	WISE	·	2.5 km	MPC · JPL
837905	2013 VU_{76}	—	November 8, 2013	Mount Lemmon	Mount Lemmon Survey	MAS	460 m	MPC · JPL
837906	2013 VE_{77}	—	November 9, 2013	Mount Lemmon	Mount Lemmon Survey	·	940 m	MPC · JPL
837907	2013 VO_{77}	—	October 26, 2013	Mount Lemmon	Mount Lemmon Survey	·	920 m	MPC · JPL
837908	2013 VD_{79}	—	November 4, 2013	Mount Lemmon	Mount Lemmon Survey	·	790 m	MPC · JPL
837909	2013 WM_{1}	—	November 9, 2013	Haleakala	Pan-STARRS 1	·	910 m	MPC · JPL
837910	2013 WU_{1}	—	February 19, 2010	WISE	WISE	·	960 m	MPC · JPL
837911	2013 WT_{2}	—	October 24, 2013	Catalina	CSS	·	1.2 km	MPC · JPL
837912	2013 WO_{9}	—	September 29, 2008	Mount Lemmon	Mount Lemmon Survey	·	1.7 km	MPC · JPL
837913	2013 WW_{11}	—	November 26, 2009	Mount Lemmon	Mount Lemmon Survey	·	1.9 km	MPC · JPL
837914	2013 WF_{15}	—	March 20, 1999	Sacramento Peak	SDSS	·	1.5 km	MPC · JPL
837915	2013 WK_{15}	—	November 3, 2013	Haleakala	Pan-STARRS 1	·	1.1 km	MPC · JPL
837916	2013 WZ_{15}	—	November 27, 2013	Haleakala	Pan-STARRS 1	LIX	2.9 km	MPC · JPL
837917	2013 WY_{16}	—	October 29, 2002	Sacramento Peak	SDSS	V	510 m	MPC · JPL
837918	2013 WB_{17}	—	August 15, 2009	Kitt Peak	Spacewatch	·	770 m	MPC · JPL
837919	2013 WJ_{19}	—	October 26, 2013	Mount Lemmon	Mount Lemmon Survey	·	590 m	MPC · JPL
837920	2013 WT_{20}	—	November 6, 2013	Haleakala	Pan-STARRS 1	·	940 m	MPC · JPL
837921	2013 WX_{21}	—	November 6, 2013	Haleakala	Pan-STARRS 1	·	1.3 km	MPC · JPL
837922	2013 WD_{23}	—	November 27, 2013	Haleakala	Pan-STARRS 1	·	1.1 km	MPC · JPL
837923	2013 WL_{25}	—	October 25, 2013	Mount Lemmon	Mount Lemmon Survey	·	540 m	MPC · JPL
837924	2013 WY_{28}	—	November 2, 2013	Kitt Peak	Spacewatch	·	880 m	MPC · JPL
837925	2013 WB_{29}	—	November 26, 2013	Mount Lemmon	Mount Lemmon Survey	·	2.1 km	MPC · JPL
837926	2013 WU_{34}	—	October 4, 2002	Sacramento Peak	SDSS	·	2.0 km	MPC · JPL
837927	2013 WD_{36}	—	November 27, 2013	Haleakala	Pan-STARRS 1	EUN	960 m	MPC · JPL
837928	2013 WS_{36}	—	March 21, 2010	Mount Lemmon	Mount Lemmon Survey	·	1.4 km	MPC · JPL
837929	2013 WM_{43}	—	November 28, 2013	Mount Lemmon	Mount Lemmon Survey	·	1.7 km	MPC · JPL
837930	2013 WE_{50}	—	October 28, 2013	Mount Lemmon	Mount Lemmon Survey	·	890 m	MPC · JPL
837931	2013 WS_{52}	—	November 25, 2013	Haleakala	Pan-STARRS 1	·	1.3 km	MPC · JPL
837932	2013 WB_{54}	—	March 2, 2010	WISE	WISE	·	1.1 km	MPC · JPL
837933	2013 WP_{55}	—	November 2, 2013	Oukaïmeden	M. Ory	(5)	840 m	MPC · JPL
837934	2013 WQ_{55}	—	November 21, 2013	Nogales	J.-C. Merlin	·	2.5 km	MPC · JPL
837935	2013 WU_{62}	—	November 28, 2013	Catalina	CSS	(5)	890 m	MPC · JPL
837936	2013 WQ_{68}	—	September 14, 2013	Mount Lemmon	Mount Lemmon Survey	·	1.0 km	MPC · JPL
837937	2013 WR_{70}	—	September 15, 2004	Kitt Peak	Spacewatch	·	980 m	MPC · JPL
837938	2013 WA_{79}	—	November 26, 2013	Mount Lemmon	Mount Lemmon Survey	THB	2.4 km	MPC · JPL
837939	2013 WR_{90}	—	April 2, 2010	WISE	WISE	·	1.1 km	MPC · JPL
837940	2013 WX_{90}	—	November 28, 2013	Mount Lemmon	Mount Lemmon Survey	·	940 m	MPC · JPL
837941	2013 WO_{92}	—	April 15, 2012	Haleakala	Pan-STARRS 1	·	570 m	MPC · JPL
837942	2013 WP_{94}	—	April 9, 2010	WISE	WISE	·	1.5 km	MPC · JPL
837943	2013 WE_{95}	—	October 7, 2013	Mount Lemmon	Mount Lemmon Survey	(17392)	1.2 km	MPC · JPL
837944	2013 WD_{101}	—	November 29, 2013	Mount Lemmon	Mount Lemmon Survey	·	1.1 km	MPC · JPL
837945	2013 WX_{102}	—	October 23, 2009	Kitt Peak	Spacewatch	·	1.5 km	MPC · JPL
837946	2013 WC_{104}	—	November 26, 2013	Mayhill-ISON	L. Elenin	·	1.1 km	MPC · JPL
837947	2013 WD_{104}	—	November 29, 2013	SATINO Remote	J. Jahn	·	1.3 km	MPC · JPL
837948	2013 WS_{106}	—	October 30, 2013	Haleakala	Pan-STARRS 1	·	1.7 km	MPC · JPL
837949	2013 WJ_{114}	—	November 28, 2013	Mount Lemmon	Mount Lemmon Survey	JUN	790 m	MPC · JPL
837950	2013 WQ_{114}	—	November 28, 2013	Mount Lemmon	Mount Lemmon Survey	·	1.3 km	MPC · JPL
837951	2013 WA_{115}	—	April 23, 2015	Haleakala	Pan-STARRS 1	·	1.0 km	MPC · JPL
837952	2013 WC_{115}	—	November 27, 2013	Haleakala	Pan-STARRS 1	·	880 m	MPC · JPL
837953	2013 WE_{115}	—	November 28, 2013	Mount Lemmon	Mount Lemmon Survey	·	1.2 km	MPC · JPL
837954	2013 WL_{115}	—	November 27, 2013	Haleakala	Pan-STARRS 1	(5)	880 m	MPC · JPL
837955	2013 WX_{115}	—	November 27, 2013	Haleakala	Pan-STARRS 1	·	950 m	MPC · JPL
837956	2013 WX_{117}	—	November 27, 2013	Haleakala	Pan-STARRS 1	·	1.0 km	MPC · JPL
837957	2013 WQ_{118}	—	November 28, 2013	Kitt Peak	Spacewatch	·	1.2 km	MPC · JPL
837958	2013 WU_{119}	—	February 26, 2010	WISE	WISE	EUP	3.6 km	MPC · JPL
837959	2013 WL_{120}	—	February 12, 2010	WISE	WISE	·	3.9 km	MPC · JPL
837960	2013 WF_{121}	—	October 19, 2006	Kitt Peak	Spacewatch	·	2.1 km	MPC · JPL
837961	2013 WV_{121}	—	March 15, 2015	Haleakala	Pan-STARRS 1	PHO	710 m	MPC · JPL
837962	2013 WY_{122}	—	June 10, 2010	WISE	WISE	·	1.7 km	MPC · JPL
837963	2013 WT_{123}	—	October 30, 2017	Haleakala	Pan-STARRS 1	·	970 m	MPC · JPL
837964	2013 WB_{124}	—	June 30, 2010	WISE	WISE	LIX	2.6 km	MPC · JPL
837965	2013 WG_{124}	—	November 27, 2013	Haleakala	Pan-STARRS 1	·	2.6 km	MPC · JPL
837966	2013 WL_{125}	—	January 13, 2010	WISE	WISE	·	2.2 km	MPC · JPL
837967	2013 WF_{126}	—	November 27, 2013	Haleakala	Pan-STARRS 1	·	1 km	MPC · JPL
837968	2013 WK_{127}	—	November 27, 2013	Haleakala	Pan-STARRS 1	·	2.0 km	MPC · JPL
837969	2013 WQ_{127}	—	November 27, 2013	Haleakala	Pan-STARRS 1	EUN	870 m	MPC · JPL
837970	2013 WU_{128}	—	November 28, 2013	Mount Lemmon	Mount Lemmon Survey	·	990 m	MPC · JPL
837971	2013 WQ_{129}	—	November 28, 2013	Haleakala	Pan-STARRS 1	H	360 m	MPC · JPL
837972	2013 WO_{130}	—	November 27, 2013	Haleakala	Pan-STARRS 1	·	2.0 km	MPC · JPL
837973	2013 WS_{130}	—	November 28, 2013	Mount Lemmon	Mount Lemmon Survey	·	830 m	MPC · JPL
837974	2013 WU_{130}	—	November 28, 2013	Mount Lemmon	Mount Lemmon Survey	·	900 m	MPC · JPL
837975	2013 WG_{132}	—	November 28, 2013	Mount Lemmon	Mount Lemmon Survey	·	770 m	MPC · JPL
837976	2013 WE_{133}	—	November 27, 2013	Haleakala	Pan-STARRS 1	·	680 m	MPC · JPL
837977	2013 WR_{133}	—	November 25, 2013	Haleakala	Pan-STARRS 1	·	690 m	MPC · JPL
837978	2013 WB_{134}	—	November 29, 2013	Haleakala	Pan-STARRS 1	·	670 m	MPC · JPL
837979	2013 WV_{134}	—	November 29, 2013	Mount Lemmon	Mount Lemmon Survey	·	1.4 km	MPC · JPL
837980	2013 WM_{137}	—	November 28, 2013	Mount Lemmon	Mount Lemmon Survey	·	1.2 km	MPC · JPL
837981	2013 WP_{138}	—	November 25, 2013	Haleakala	Pan-STARRS 1	·	1.1 km	MPC · JPL
837982	2013 WR_{140}	—	November 28, 2013	Mount Lemmon	Mount Lemmon Survey	H	400 m	MPC · JPL
837983	2013 WN_{141}	—	November 28, 2013	Kitt Peak	Spacewatch	·	1.3 km	MPC · JPL
837984	2013 WY_{141}	—	November 28, 2013	Kitt Peak	Spacewatch	·	720 m	MPC · JPL
837985	2013 WC_{143}	—	November 26, 2013	Mount Lemmon	Mount Lemmon Survey	KOR	950 m	MPC · JPL
837986	2013 WP_{143}	—	November 26, 2013	Haleakala	Pan-STARRS 1	AGN	890 m	MPC · JPL
837987	2013 XG_{11}	—	December 5, 2005	Mount Lemmon	Mount Lemmon Survey	·	830 m	MPC · JPL
837988	2013 XJ_{20}	—	December 11, 2013	Haleakala	Pan-STARRS 1	·	790 m	MPC · JPL
837989	2013 XM_{21}	—	December 11, 2013	Haleakala	Pan-STARRS 1	H	470 m	MPC · JPL
837990	2013 XZ_{22}	—	November 28, 2013	Mount Lemmon	Mount Lemmon Survey	·	430 m	MPC · JPL
837991	2013 XE_{24}	—	March 26, 2010	WISE	WISE	·	2.4 km	MPC · JPL
837992	2013 XL_{26}	—	December 6, 2013	Haleakala	Pan-STARRS 1	·	1.5 km	MPC · JPL
837993	2013 XY_{26}	—	July 22, 2010	WISE	WISE	·	2.2 km	MPC · JPL
837994	2013 XS_{28}	—	December 11, 2013	Haleakala	Pan-STARRS 1	·	1.4 km	MPC · JPL
837995	2013 XP_{29}	—	February 25, 2010	WISE	WISE	PHO	750 m	MPC · JPL
837996	2013 XX_{29}	—	December 13, 2013	Mount Lemmon	Mount Lemmon Survey	·	900 m	MPC · JPL
837997	2013 XD_{30}	—	December 7, 2013	Haleakala	Pan-STARRS 1	EUN	950 m	MPC · JPL
837998	2013 XO_{30}	—	December 11, 2013	Haleakala	Pan-STARRS 1	·	1.2 km	MPC · JPL
837999	2013 XX_{30}	—	December 11, 2013	Haleakala	Pan-STARRS 1	·	1.2 km	MPC · JPL
838000	2013 XD_{31}	—	December 10, 2013	Mount Lemmon	Mount Lemmon Survey	·	920 m	MPC · JPL

back to top
