= (837253) 2013 FW13 =

Apollo asteroid and potentially hazardous object

(837253) 2013 FW_{13}
Discovery
- Discovered by: Catalina Sky Survey
- Discovery site: Mount Lemmon, Arizona
- Discovery date: 23 March 2013

Designations
- Alternative designations: MPO 266948
- Minor planet category: Apollo NEO

Orbital characteristics
- Epoch 4 September 2017 (JD 2458000.5)
- Uncertainty parameter 5
- Observation arc: 46 d
- Aphelion: 1.52575 AU (228.249 Gm)
- Perihelion: 0.71491 AU (106.949 Gm)
- Semi-major axis: 1.12033 AU (167.599 Gm)
- Eccentricity: 0.36188
- Orbital period (sidereal): 1.19 yr (433.129 d); 1.19 yr
- Mean anomaly: 330.25°
- Mean motion: 0° 49^{m} 52.464^{s} /day
- Inclination: 23.4137°
- Longitude of ascending node: 175.855°
- Argument of perihelion: 272.28°
- Earth MOID: 0.0125399 AU (1,875,940 km)
- Mercury MOID: 0.46247 AU (69,185,000 km)
- Jupiter MOID: 3.80531 AU (569.266 Gm)

Physical characteristics
- Absolute magnitude (H): 21.7

(837253) 2013 FW_{13} is an Apollo asteroid and a potentially hazardous object, that was discovered on 23 March 2013 by the Catalina Sky Survey. Further observation of its orbital calculation was made by amateur astronomer Mohammed Alsunni of Sudan.

2013 FW_{13} is a potentially hazardous asteroid (PHA) since its minimum orbit intersection distance (MOID) is less than 0.05 AU and its diameter is estimated to be greater than ~150 meters. The Earth MOID is 0.013 AU (1,900,000 km; 1,200,000 mi). On 18 September 2024 it was expected to safely pass about 0.02 AU (3,000,000 km; 1,900,000 mi) from Earth.

The absolute magnitude of the asteroid is 21.70, giving the object an approximate diameter of 120–270 meters.
