= List of asteroid close approaches to Earth in 2013 =

- Asteroids which came closer to Earth than the Moon in 2013 by time of discovery
- After closest approach: 12 (50.0%)
- < 24 hours before: 2 (8.3%)
- up to 7 days before: 9 (37.5%)
- > one week before: 0 (0.0%)
- > 7 weeks before: 1 (4.2%)
- > one year before: 0 (0.0%)
Other years

Below is the list of asteroid close approaches to Earth in 2013. This was the year of the Chelyabinsk impact, in addition to the other NEO flybys

== Timeline of known close approaches less than one lunar distance from Earth in 2013 ==
A list of known Near-Earth asteroid close approaches less than 1 lunar distance (384,400 km or 0.00257 AU) from Earth in 2013, based on the close approach database of the Center for Near-Earth Object Studies (CNEOS).

The CNEOS database of close approaches lists some close approaches a full orbit or more before the discovery of the object, derived by orbit calculation. The list below only includes close approaches that are evidenced by observations, thus the pre-discovery close approaches would only be included if the object was found by precovery, but there was no such close approach in 2013.

This list and relevant databases do not consider impacts as close approaches, thus the list does not include any of the 24 objects that collided with Earth's atmosphere in 2013, none of which were discovered in advance, but were observed visually or recorded by sensors designed to detect detonation of nuclear devices. Of the 24 objects so detected, 5 had an impact energy greater than that of a 1 kiloton device including the 440 kiloton Chelyabinsk meteor, estimated at 20 m in diameter, which injured around 1500 people and damaged over 7000 buildings.

Rows highlighted red indicate objects which were not discovered until after closest approach

Rows highlighted yellow indicate objects discovered less than 24 hours before closest approach

Rows highlighted green indicate objects discovered more than one week before closest approach

Rows highlighted turquoise indicate objects discovered more than 7 weeks before closest approach

Rows highlighted blue indicate objects discovered more than one year before closest approach
(i.e. objects successfully cataloged on a previous orbit, rather than being detected during final approach)

Date of closest approach	Date discovered	Object	Nominal geocentric distance (AU) (Note: Distance from the center of Earth to the center of the object. See the NASA/JPL Solar System Dynamics Glossary: Geocentric. Earth has a radius of approximately 6,400 km.)	Nominal geocentric distance (LD)	Size (m) (approximate)	(H) (abs. mag.)	Closer approach to Moon	Refs
2013-01-15	2013-01-20	2013 BR_{27}	0.00146 AU (218,000 km; 136,000 mi)	0.57	7.3–16	27.8	Yes	data · 2013 BR27
2013-01-28	2013-02-01	2013 CY	0.00230 AU (344,000 km; 214,000 mi)	0.9	6.1–14	28.2		data · 2013 CY
2013-02-05	2013-02-06	2013 CY_{32}	0.000703 AU (105,200 km; 65,300 mi)	0.27	6.4–14	28.1		data · 2013 CY32
2013-02-11	2013-02-14	2013 CL_{129}	0.00186 AU (278,000 km; 173,000 mi)	0.72	5.6–12	28.4	Yes	data · 2013 CL129
2013-02-15	2012-02-23	367943 Duende	0.000228 AU (34,100 km; 21,200 mi)	0.09	39–86	24.2		data · 2012 DA14
2013-03-04	2013-03-02	2013 EC	0.00246 AU (368,000 km; 229,000 mi)	0.96	7.3–16	27.8		data · 2013 EC
2013-03-09	2013-03-07	2013 EC_{20}	0.00100 AU (150,000 km; 93,000 mi)	0.39	4.2–9.4	29.0		data · 2013 EC20
2013-04-18	2013-04-19	2013 HT_{25}	0.000360 AU (53,900 km; 33,500 mi)	0.14	4.5–10	28.9		data · 2013 HT25
2013-06-08	2013-06-06	2013 LR_{6}	0.000742 AU (111,000 km; 69,000 mi)	0.29	7.3–16	27.8		data · 2013 LR6
2013-08-04	2013-08-04	2013 PJ10	0.00248 AU (371,000 km; 231,000 mi)	0.97	32–71	24.6		data · 2013 PJ10
2013-08-09	2013-08-07	2013 PS_{13}	0.00137 AU (205,000 km; 127,000 mi)	0.53	9.7–22	27.2		data · 2013 PS13
2013-09-03	2013-09-02	2013 RG	0.00151 AU (226,000 km; 140,000 mi)	0.59	3.5–7.8	29.4		data · 2013 RG
2013-09-04	2013-09-05	2013 RO_{30}	0.00195 AU (292,000 km; 181,000 mi)	0.76	5.6–12	28.4		data · 2013 RO30
2013-09-05	2013-09-03	2013 RF_{32}	0.00112 AU (168,000 km; 104,000 mi)	0.44	4.8-11	28.7		data · 2013 RF32
2013-09-18	2013-09-13	2013 RZ_{53}	0.00163 AU (244,000 km; 152,000 mi)	0.63	1.6–3.6	31.1		data · 2013 RZ53
2013-10-04	2013-10-05	2013 TR_{12}	0.00143 AU (214,000 km; 133,000 mi)	0.56	5.1–11	28.6		data · 2013 TR12
2013-10-09	2013-10-10	2013 TL_{127}	0.00252 AU (377,000 km; 234,000 mi)	0.98	12–27	26.7	Yes	data · 2013 TL127
2013-10-21	2013-10-23	2013 UR_{1}	0.00168 AU (251,000 km; 156,000 mi)	0.65	7–16	27.9	Yes	data · 2013 UR1
2013-10-25	2013-10-24	2013 UX_{2}	0.00100 AU (150,000 km; 93,000 mi)	0.39	3.8–8.6	29.2		data · 2013 UX2
2013-10-29	2013-10-25	2013 UV_{3}	0.00189 AU (283,000 km; 176,000 mi)	0.74	12–26	26.8	Yes	data · 2013 UV3
2013-11-08	2013-11-09	2013 VJ_{11}	0.00228 AU (341,000 km; 212,000 mi)	0.89	7–16	27.9	Yes	data · 2013 VJ11
2013-11-29	2013-11-28	2013 WH_{25}	0.000895 AU (133,900 km; 83,200 mi)	0.35	3.2–7.1	29.6		data · 2013 WH25
2013-12-11	2013-12-12	2013 XS_{21}	0.000485 AU (72,600 km; 45,100 mi)	0.19	3.5–7.8	29.4		data · 2013 XS21
2013-12-23	2013-12-23	2013 YB	0.000181 AU (27,100 km; 16,800 mi)	0.07	1.4–3.1	31.4		data · 2013 YB

=== Warning times by size ===
This sub-section visualises the warning times of the close approaches listed in the above table, depending on the size of the asteroid. The sizes of the charts show the relative sizes of the asteroids to scale. For comparison, the approximate size of a person is also shown. This is based the absolute magnitude of each asteroid, an approximate measure of size based on brightness.

Absolute magnitude 30 and greater

Silhouette of man standing and facing forward

(size of a person for comparison)

Absolute magnitude 30 > H ≥ 29

Absolute magnitude 29 > H ≥ 28

Absolute magnitude 28 > H ≥ 27

Absolute magnitude 27 > H ≥ 26

(probable size of the Chelyabinsk meteor)

Absolute magnitude 26 > H ≥ 25

None

Absolute magnitude 25 > H (largest)

- After closest approach: 1 (50.0%)
- < 24 hours before: 0 (0.0%)
- up to 7 days before: 0 (0.0%)
- > one week before: 0 (0.0%)
- > 7 weeks before: 1 (50.0%)
- > one year before: 0 (0.0%)

== Additional examples ==
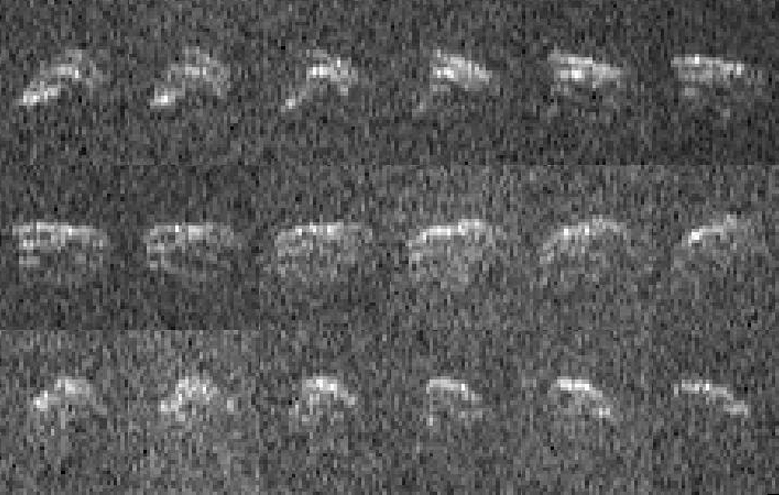
Radar imaging of 2013 ET during its approach in March 2013.

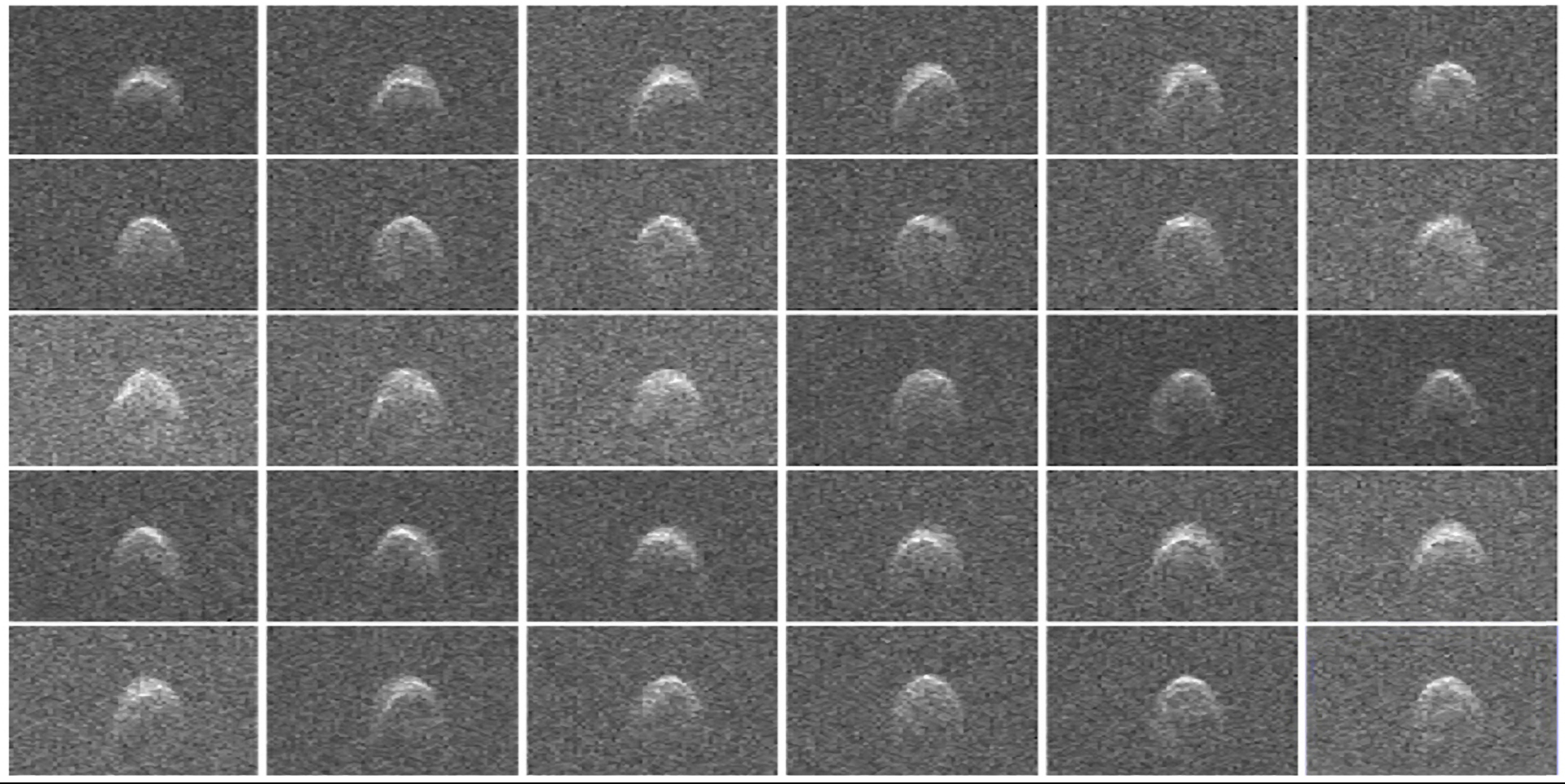
2005 WK4 in August 2013

An example list of near-Earth asteroids that passed more than 1 lunar distance (384,400 km or 0.00256 AU) from Earth in 2013.

- 2013 XH22, December 18, 2013 (1.9 LD)
- 2013 XY8, December 11, 2013 (2 LD)
- 3361 Orpheus, December 7, 2013 (40.1 LD)
- 2001 AV43, November 18, 2013 (3 LD)
- (52760) 1998 ML14, August 24, 2013
- (277475) 2005 WK4, August 8, 2013
- 2003 DZ15, July 30, 2013
- 2006 BL8, July 26, 2013
- 2009 FE, June 4, 2013
- (285263) 1998 QE2, May 29, 2013
- (163364) 2002 OD20, May 23, 2013
- (7888) 1993 UC, March 20, 2013
- 2013 ET, March 9, 2013
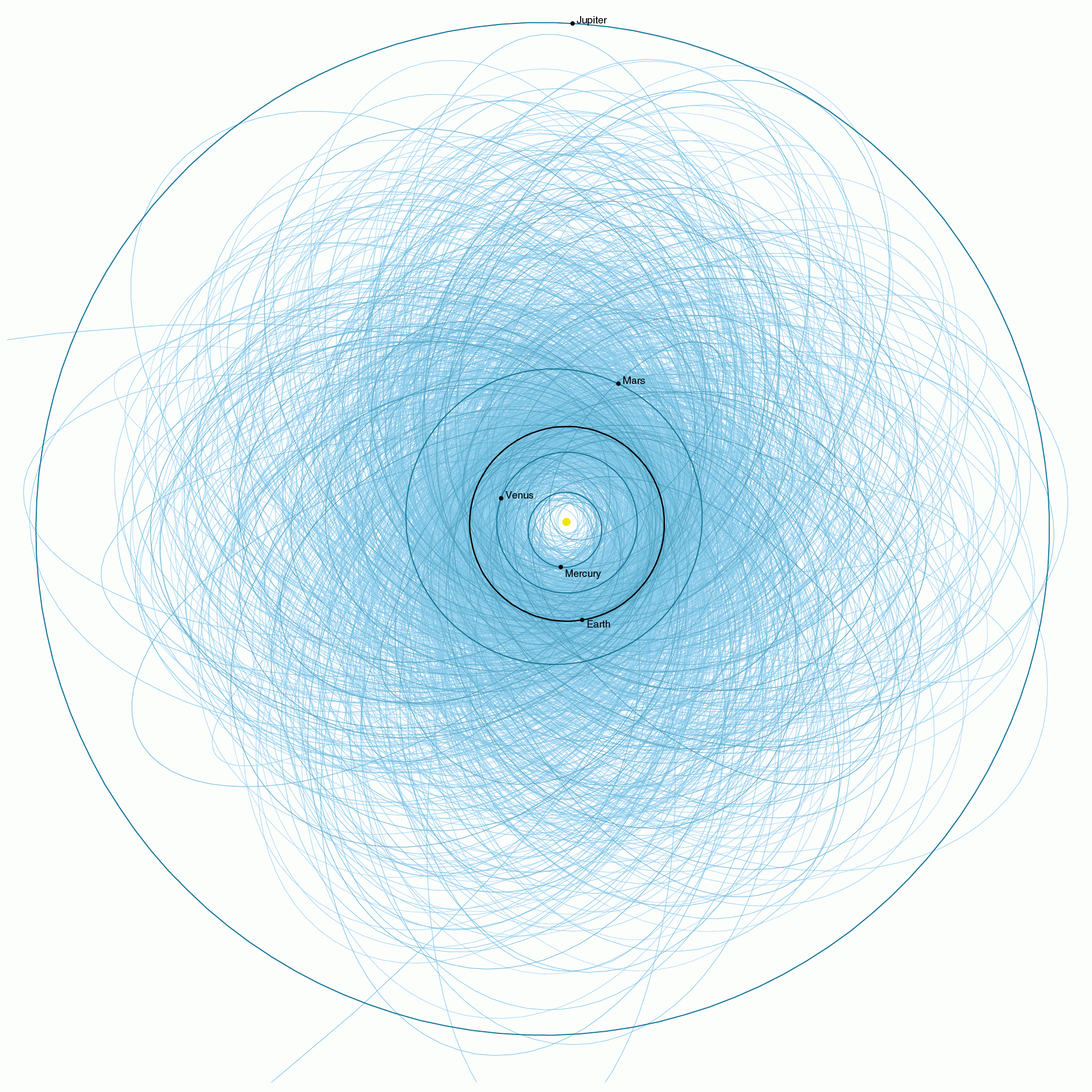
Plot of orbits of known potentially hazardous asteroids (size over 460 feet (140 m) and passing within 4.7 million miles (7.6×10^{6} km) of Earth's orbit) as of early 2013 (alternate image).

== See also ==
- List of asteroid close approaches to Earth
- List of asteroid close approaches to Earth in 2012
- List of asteroid close approaches to Earth in 2014
