= List of asteroid close approaches to Earth in 2010 =

- Asteroids which came closer to Earth than the Moon in 2010 by time of discovery
- After closest approach: 11 (47.8%)
- < 24 hours before: 0 (0.0%)
- up to 7 days before: 12 (52.2%)
- > one week before: 0 (0.0%)
- > 7 weeks before: 0 (0.0%)
- > one year before: 0 (0.0%)
Other years

Below is the list of asteroid close approaches to Earth in 2010.

== Timeline of close approaches less than one lunar distance from Earth in 2010 ==
A list of known near-Earth asteroid close approaches less than 1 lunar distance (384,400 km or 0.00257 AU) from Earth in 2010, based on the close approach database of the Center for Near-Earth Object Studies (CNEOS).

The CNEOS database of close approaches lists some close approaches a full orbit or more before the discovery of the object, derived by orbit calculation. The list below only includes close approaches that are evidenced by observations, thus the pre-discovery close approaches would only be included if the object was found by precovery, but there was no such close approach in 2010.

This list and the relevant databases do not consider impacts as close approaches, thus this list does not include any of the objects that collided with Earth's atmosphere in 2010, none of which were discovered in advance, but were observed visually or recorded by sensors designed to detect detonation of nuclear devices.

Rows highlighted red indicate objects which were not discovered until after closest approach

Rows highlighted yellow indicate objects discovered less than 24 hours before closest approach

Rows highlighted green indicate objects discovered more than one week before closest approach

Rows highlighted turquoise indicate objects discovered more than 7 weeks before closest approach

Rows highlighted blue indicate objects discovered more than one year before closest approach
(i.e. objects successfully cataloged on a previous orbit, rather than being detected during final approach)

Date of closest approach	Date discovered	Object	Nominal geocentric distance (AU) (Note: Distance from the center of Earth to the center of the object. See the NASA/JPL Solar System Dynamics Glossary: Geocentric. Earth has a radius of approximately 6,400 km.)	Nominal geocentric distance (LD)	Size (m) (approximate)	(H) (abs. mag.)	Closer approach to Moon	Refs
2010-01-13	2010-01-10	2010 AL30	0.000862 AU (129,000 km; 80,100 mi)	0.34	9.7-22	27.2		data · 2010 AL_{30}
2010-02-17	2010-02-14	2010 CK_{19}	0.00233 AU (349,000 km; 217,000 mi)	0.91	7-16	27.9		data · 2010 CK_{19}
2010-04-18	2010-04-20	2010 HP_{20}	0.00160 AU (239,000 km; 149,000 mi)	0.62	8.3–19	27.5		data · 2010 HP_{20}
2010-05-23	2010-05-20	2010 KO_{10}	0.00116 AU (174,000 km; 108,000 mi)	0.45	10-23	27.1		data · 2010 KO_{10}
2010-05-26	2010-05-24	2010 KV_{39}	0.00167 AU (250,000 km; 155,000 mi)	0.65	12-26	26.8		data · 2010 KV_{39}
2010-09-08	2010-09-05	2010 RX30	0.00166 AU (248,000 km; 154,000 mi)	0.64	10-23	27.1		data · 2010 RX_{30}
2010-09-08	2010-09-05	2010 RF12	0.000531 AU (79,400 km; 49,400 mi)	0.21	5.5-12	28.4		data · 2010 RF_{12}
2010-09-08	2010-09-10	2010 RK_{53}	0.000482 AU (72,100 km; 44,800 mi)	0.19	7-16	27.9		data · 2010 RK_{53}
2010-09-30	2010-09-28	2010 SK_{13}	0.00178 AU (266,000 km; 165,000 mi)	0.69	8.8-20	27.4		data · 2010 SK_{13}
2010-10-09	2010-10-11	2010 TW_{54}	0.00108 AU (162,000 km; 100,000 mi)	0.42	8-18	27.6		data · 2010 TW_{54}
2010-10-11	2010-10-13	2010 TN_{55}	0.00219 AU (328,000 km; 204,000 mi)	0.85	11-25	26.9	Yes	data · 2010 TN_{55}
2010-10-12	2010-10-09	2010 TD54	0.000346 AU (51,800 km; 32,200 mi)	0.13	4.4-9.9	28.9		data · 2010 TD_{54}
2010-10-16	2010-10-17	2010 UE	0.000763 AU (114,100 km; 70,900 mi)	0.30	3-7	29.6		data · 2010 UE
2010-10-17	2010-10-12	2010 TE_{55}	0.00245 AU (367,000 km; 228,000 mi)	0.95	6.7-15	28.0	Yes	data · 2010 TE_{55}
2010-10-26	2010-10-30	2010 UY_{7}	0.00163 AU (244,000 km; 152,000 mi)	0.63	5.3-12	28.5	Yes	data · 2010 UY_{7}
2010-11-02	2010-10-29	2010 UJ_{7}	0.00191 AU (286,000 km; 178,000 mi)	0.74	22-49	25.4		data · 2010 UJ_{7}
2010-11-02	2010-11-03	2010 VN_{1}	0.000866 AU (129,600 km; 80,500 mi)	0.34	5.8-13	28.3		data · 2010 VN_{1}
2010-11-07	2010-11-06	2010 VR_{21}	0.00238 AU (356,000 km; 221,000 mi)	0.92	3.8-8.4	29.3		data · 2010 VR_{21}
2010-11-12	2010-11-14	2010 VP_{139}	0.000537 AU (80,300 km; 49,900 mi)	0.21	3.8-8.6	29.2		data · 2010 VP_{139}
2010-11-13	2010-11-15	2010 VC_{140}	0.00194 AU (290,000 km; 180,000 mi)	0.75	7-16	27.9		data · 2010 VC_{140}
2010-11-17	2010-11-16	2010 WA	0.000260 AU (38,900 km; 24,200 mi)	0.10	2.7-5.9	30.0		data · 2010 WA
2010-11-29	2010-12-02	2010 XR	0.00129 AU (193,000 km; 120,000 mi)	0.50	11-25	26.9		data · 2010 XR
2010-11-30	2010-12-01	2010 XB	0.000352 AU (52,700 km; 32,700 mi)	0.14	3.2-7.1	29.6		data · 2010 XB

=== Warning times by size ===
This sub-section visualises the warning times of the close approaches listed in the above table, depending on the size of the asteroid. The sizes of the charts show the relative sizes of the asteroids to scale. For comparison, the approximate size of a person is also shown. This is based the absolute magnitude of each asteroid, an approximate measure of size based on brightness.

Absolute magnitude H ≥ 30 (smallest)

Silhouette of man standing and facing forward

(size of a person for comparison)

Absolute magnitude 30 > H ≥ 29

Absolute magnitude 29 > H ≥ 28

Absolute magnitude 28 > H ≥ 27

Absolute magnitude 27 > H ≥ 26

Absolute magnitude 26 > H ≥ 25

- After closest approach: 0 (0.0%)
- < 24 hours before: 0 (0.0%)
- up to 7 days before: 1 (100.0%)
- > one week before: 0 (0.0%)
- > 7 weeks before: 0 (0.0%)
- > one year before: 0 (0.0%)

Absolute magnitude 25 > H (largest)

None

=== Notes ===
2015 AQ_{43} may have passed as close as 0.00012 AU (18,000 km; 11,000 mi) (0.05 Lunar Distances) from the Earth on January 15, 2010, but the nominal distance suggests it only passed 5 LD away.

== See also ==
- List of asteroid close approaches to Earth
- List of asteroid close approaches to Earth in 2009
- List of asteroid close approaches to Earth in 2011
