= 2009 VA =

Near-Earth asteroid

Discovery
- Discovered by: Catalina Sky Survey
- Discovery date: 6 November 2009

Designations
- Alternative names: none
- Minor planet category: Apollo (NEO)

Orbital characteristics
- Epoch 6 November 2009 (JD 2455141.5)
- Uncertainty parameter 9
- Observation arc: 3 hours
- Aphelion: 1.93 AU
- Perihelion: 0.9177 AU
- Semi-major axis: 1.43 AU
- Eccentricity: 0.357
- Orbital period (sidereal): 1.71 yr
- Mean anomaly: 339°
- Mean motion: 0° 34^{m} 39.396^{s} /day
- Inclination: 7.5°
- Longitude of ascending node: 224.5°
- Argument of perihelion: 224°
- Earth MOID: 0.00013 AU (19,000 km)
- Jupiter MOID: 3.3 AU

Physical characteristics
- Mean diameter: ~6 meters
- Absolute magnitude (H): 28.6

2009 VA is an asteroid that came within 14,000 kilometres (8,700 mi) of Earth on 6 November 2009 making it the third closest non-impacting approach of a cataloged asteroid.

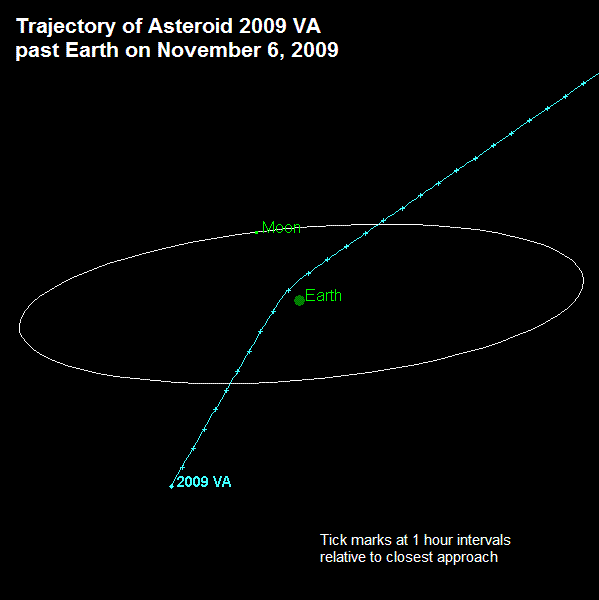
The trajectory of the object as it passed Earth

With a diameter of only 7 metres (23 ft), scientists think that even if it had been on a direct collision course with Earth, it would have likely burned up in the atmosphere. The space rock made its pass by Earth just fifteen hours after its discovery.

The asteroid was first discovered by the Catalina Sky Survey at the University of Arizona. It was determined that the object would make a pass well within the orbit of the Moon, but would not strike Earth. The object passed so close to Earth that its orbit was modified by Earth's gravity.

== 2025 virtual impactor ==
The asteroid only has a very short observation arc of 3 hours and has not been observed since 2009 (16 years ago). Given the short arc, long term predictions of the asteroids position over many years are poorly constrained. It is listed on the Sentry Risk Table with a 1 in 48,000 chance of an Earth impact on 6 November 2025.

JPL #7 nominal distance for the 6 November 2025 Virtual Impactor Scenario
JPL Horizons nominal geocentric distance (AU)	uncertainty region (3-sigma)
0.3 AU (45,000,000 km; 120 LD)	± 900 million km

== See also ==
- 2008 TC_{3}
- 2010 RF12, 2010 RX30, 2010 TD54 - a similar-sized asteroids that passed Earth in 2010
- List of notable asteroids#Record-setting close approaches to Earth for other, closer approaches
- List of asteroid close approaches to Earth in 2009
