= 2006 BL8 =

Near-Earth asteroid

2006 BL_{8}
Discovery
- Discovered by: Catalina Sky Survey
- Discovery site: Summerhaven, Arizona, USA
- Discovery date: 24 January 2006

Designations
- Alternative designations: MPO 98091
- Minor planet category: NEO · Apollo

Orbital characteristics
- Epoch 26 January 2006 (JD 2453761.5)
- Uncertainty parameter 6
- Observation arc: 6 d
- Aphelion: 1.45703 AU (217.969 Gm)
- Perihelion: 0.78758 AU (117.820 Gm)
- Semi-major axis: 1.12230 AU (167.894 Gm)
- Eccentricity: 0.29825
- Orbital period (sidereal): 1.19 yr (434.27 d); 1.19 yr
- Mean anomaly: 305.27°
- Mean motion: 0° 49^{m} 38.028^{s} /day
- Inclination: 12.2351°
- Longitude of ascending node: 121.282°
- Argument of perihelion: 92.23°
- Earth MOID: 0.00367789 AU (550,205 km)
- Mercury MOID: 0.36209 AU (54,168,000 km)

Physical characteristics
- Absolute magnitude (H): 24.7

2006 BL_{8} is a sub-kilometer asteroid, classified as a near-Earth object of the Apollo group, that flew by Earth on 26 July 2013 at about 9 lunar distances. It is reported to be about 48 meters (157 ft) in diameter.

2006 BL_{8} was detected by the Catalina Sky Survey on 24 January 2006.

Some other NEOs noted for their Earth flybys in the summer of 2013, include 2009 FE (4 June 2013 at 9.6 LD), 2003 DZ_{15} (on 29 July 2013 passed at 7.6 LD), and (277475) 2005 WK4 (on 9 August 2013 passed at 8.1 LD).

== See also ==
- List of asteroid close approaches to Earth in 2013
- (285263) 1998 QE2 (Passed at 15 LD on May 31, 2013, with a size between 1–3 km)
