= DA14 =

DA14 may refer to:

- 2012 DA14, a near-Earth asteroid, that passed closer to Earth than geostationary orbit of communications satellites, on 15 February 2013
- DA14, a DA postcode area postcode for SIDCUP in Britain
- DA14/L, a measure used for diesel pricing in Algeria
