= 2013 EC =

Near-Earth asteroid

Discovery
- Discovered by: Mt. Lemmon Survey
- Discovery site: Summerhaven, Arizona, USA
- Discovery date: 2 March 2013

Designations
- Alternative designations: MPO 256829
- Minor planet category: Apollo NEO

Orbital characteristics
- Epoch 3 March 2013 (JD 2456354.5)
- Uncertainty parameter 7
- Observation arc: 1 d
- Aphelion: 3.66151 AU (547.754 Gm)
- Perihelion: 0.65528 AU (98.028 Gm)
- Semi-major axis: 2.15839 AU (322.891 Gm)
- Eccentricity: 0.69641
- Orbital period (sidereal): 3.17 yr (1158.23 d); 3.17 yr
- Mean anomaly: 345.65°
- Mean motion: 0° 18^{m} 35.676^{s} /day
- Inclination: 6.02802°
- Longitude of ascending node: 342.373°
- Argument of perihelion: 261.34°
- Earth MOID: 0.00239372 AU (358,095 km)
- Mercury MOID: 0.1939 AU (29,010,000 km)
- Jupiter MOID: 1.45575 AU (217.777 Gm)

Physical characteristics
- Absolute magnitude (H): 27.8

2013 EC is a near-Earth asteroid that passed Earth just inside the orbit of the Moon, with its closest approach on 4 March 2013 at 07:35 UTC. 2013 EC was discovered by the Mount Lemmon Observatory in Arizona, United States, on March 2, 2013. Asteroid 2013 EC is estimated to be equal in size to the Chelyabinsk meteor that impacted on 15 February 2013. Its measurement is about 10 to 17 meters (33 to 56 ft) wide.

2013 EC was one of four asteroids that passed in the vicinity of Earth during one week in early March 2013. The other asteroids in this group besides 2013 EC, included 2013 ET (2.5 lunar distances), 2013 EC20, and 2013 EN20.

== See also ==
- List of asteroid close approaches to Earth in 2013
- Near-Earth Asteroid Tracking
- List of asteroid close approaches to Earth
- 367943 Duende
- 99942 Apophis
- 2013 ET
- 2013 PJ10
