= GA6 =

GA6, GA-6, or GA 6 may refer to:

- 2010 GA_{6}, a micro-asteroid of the Apollo group
- Georgia State Route 6, a state highway in Georgia, United States
- Georgia's 6th congressional district, congressional district in Georgia, United States
- Trumpchi GA6, a 2014–present Chinese mid-size sedan
