= 2013 XY8 =

Near-Earth asteroid

2013 XY_{8}
Discovery
- Discovered by: Catalina Sky Survey
- Discovery site: Summerhaven, Arizona, USA
- Discovery date: 7 December 2013

Designations
- Alternative designations: MPO 307077
- Minor planet category: Apollo NEO

Orbital characteristics
- Epoch 4 September 2017 (JD 2458000.5)
- Uncertainty parameter 2
- Observation arc: 6 d
- Aphelion: 3.46240 AU (517.968 Gm)
- Perihelion: 0.95250 AU (142.492 Gm)
- Semi-major axis: 2.20745 AU (330.230 Gm)
- Eccentricity: 0.56851
- Orbital period (sidereal): 3.28 yr (1197.94 d); 3.28 yr
- Mean anomaly: 43.430°
- Mean motion: 0° 18^{m} 1.944^{s} /day
- Inclination: 1.81202°
- Longitude of ascending node: 80.9083°
- Argument of perihelion: 25.004°
- Earth MOID: 0.000538513 AU (80,560.4 km)
- Mercury MOID: 0.63716 AU (95,318,000 km)
- Jupiter MOID: 1.71473 AU (256.520 Gm)

Physical characteristics
- Sidereal rotation period: 0.06055 hr
- Absolute magnitude (H): 25.0

2013 XY_{8} is a near-Earth Apollo asteroid that passed 0.00508 AU (760,000 km; 472,000 mi) from Earth on 11 December 2013. It passed by Earth at about 2 lunar distances, and was discovered 5 days previously, on 7 December 2013. At 30–70 metres (98–230 feet) across it is bigger than the estimated size of the Chelyabinsk meteor impact of 2013. 2013 XY_{8} has been observed by radar and has a well determined orbit. It will pass about 0.0007 AU (100,000 km; 65,000 mi) from the Moon on 11 December 2095. 2013 XY8 was detected by the Catalina Sky Survey and follow up observations were conducted with the Faulkes Telescope South.

It was described as being about the size of the Space Shuttle and was reported to be traveling at 14 kilometers per second (over 31 thousand miles per hour) relative to the Earth.

2013 XY8 was noted for being analogous to 101955 Bennu.

== Observations ==
2013 XY8 was imaged by the Faulkes Telescope South.

== See also ==
- List of asteroid close approaches to Earth in 2013
