= 2013 ET =

Near-Earth asteroid

- Radar imaging of 2013 ET

Discovery
- Discovered by: Catalina Sky Survey
- Discovery site: Mount Lemmon Obs. (first observed only)
- Discovery date: 3 March 2013

Designations
- Alternative designations: 2001 SY_{169}
- Minor planet category: NEO · Apollo

Orbital characteristics
- Epoch 2020-May-31 (JD 2459000.5)
- Uncertainty parameter 0
- Observation arc: 11 years
- Aphelion: 1.6688 AU (249.65 Gm)
- Perihelion: 0.74228 AU (111.044 Gm)
- Semi-major axis: 1.2055 AU (180.34 Gm)
- Eccentricity: 0.38428
- Orbital period (sidereal): 1.32 yr (483.49 d)
- Mean anomaly: 121.70°
- Mean motion: 0° 44^{m} 39.048^{s} /day
- Inclination: 4.8515°
- Longitude of ascending node: 171.30°
- Argument of perihelion: 81.937°
- Earth MOID: 0.0041 AU (610,000 km)
- Mercury MOID: 0.287 AU (42,900,000 km)

Physical characteristics
- Dimensions: 100 m (330 ft)
- Absolute magnitude (H): 22.7

2013 ET is a near-Earth asteroid that was first observed on 3 March 2013, six days before its closest approach to Earth. It is estimated to be around 100 meters (330 feet) wide. The orbit of 2001 SY_{169} has been connected to 2013 ET extending the observation arc to 11 years.

Its closest approach to Earth was 0.0065207 AU (975,480 km; 606,140 mi) on 9 March 2013 at 12:09 UT. The asteroid also makes close approaches to Mars and Venus. The asteroid was imaged by Goldstone radar on 10 March 2013.

2013 ET was one of four asteroids that passed in the vicinity of Earth during one week in early March 2013. The other asteroids in this group besides 2013 ET, included 2013 EC, 2013 EC20, and 2013 EN20.

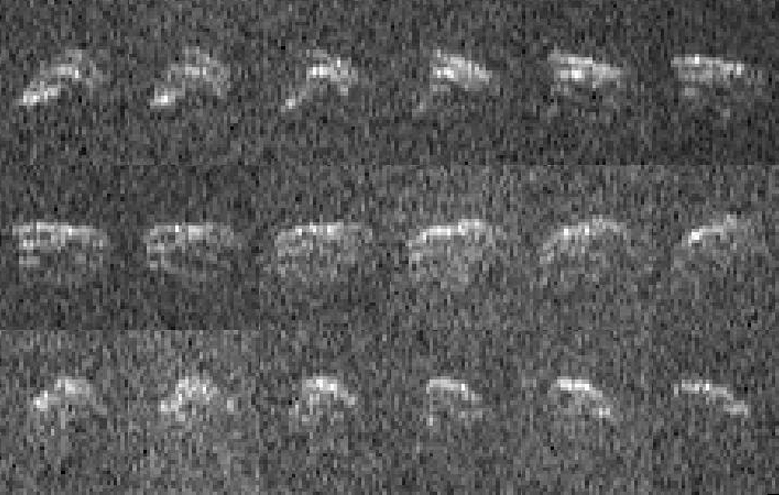
Sequence of radar images of 2013 ET.

== See also ==
- List of asteroid close approaches to Earth in 2013
- 2013 EC
- 2013 PJ10
- List of asteroid close approaches to Earth
- Near-Earth Asteroid Tracking
