= List of asteroid close approaches to Earth in 2009 =

- Asteroids which came closer to Earth than the Moon in 2009 by time of discovery
- After closest approach: 7 (36.8%)
- < 24 hours before: 1 (5.3%)
- up to 7 days before: 11 (57.9%)
- > one week before: 0 (0.0%)
- > 7 weeks before: 0 (0.0%)
- > one year before: 0 (0.0%)
Other years

Below is the list of asteroid close approaches to Earth in 2009.

== Timeline of close approaches less than one lunar distance from Earth in 2009 ==
A list of known near-Earth asteroid close approaches less than 1 lunar distance (384,400 km or 0.00257 AU) from Earth in 2009, based on the close approach database of the Center for Near-Earth Object Studies (CNEOS).

The CNEOS database of close approaches lists some close approaches a full orbit or more before the discovery of the object, derived by orbit calculation. The list below only includes close approaches that are evidenced by observations, thus the pre-discovery close approaches would only be included if the object was found by precovery, but there was no such close approach in 2009.

This list and the relevant databases do not consider impacts as close approaches, thus this list does not include any of the objects that collided with Earth's atmosphere in 2009, none of which were discovered in advance, but were observed visually or recorded by sensors designed to detect detonation of nuclear devices.

Rows highlighted red indicate objects which were not discovered until after closest approach

Rows highlighted yellow indicate objects discovered less than 24 hours before closest approach

Rows highlighted green indicate objects discovered more than one week before closest approach

Rows highlighted turquoise indicate objects discovered more than 7 weeks before closest approach

Rows highlighted blue indicate objects discovered more than one year before closest approach
(i.e. objects successfully cataloged on a previous orbit, rather than being detected during final approach)

Date of closest approach	Date discovered	Object	Nominal geocentric distance (AU) (Note: Distance from the center of Earth to the center of the object. See the NASA/JPL Solar System Dynamics Glossary: Geocentric. Earth has a radius of approximately 6,400 km.)	Nominal geocentric distance (LD)	Size (m) (approximate)	(H) (abs. mag.)	Closer approach to Moon	Refs
2009-02-02	2009-02-04	2009 CC_{2}	0.00126 AU (188,000 km; 117,000 mi)	0.49	7.3–16	27.8		data · 2009 CC_{2}
2009-02-27	2009-03-03	2009 EJ_{1}	0.000411 AU (61,500 km; 38,200 mi)	0.16	5.6–12	28.4		data · 2009 EJ_{1}
2009-03-02	2009-02-27	2009 DD_{45}	0.000483 AU (72,300 km; 44,900 mi)	0.19	18–41	25.8		data · 2009 DD_{45}
2009-03-06	2009-03-02	2009 EW	0.00227 AU (340,000 km; 211,000 mi)	0.88	14–31	26.4		data · 2009 EW
2009-03-18	2009-03-17	2009 FH	0.000568 AU (85,000 km; 52,800 mi)	0.22	13–28	26.6		data · 2009 FH
2009-03-19	2009-03-17	2009 FK	0.00251 AU (375,000 km; 233,000 mi)	0.98	5.8–13	28.3	Yes	data · 2009 FK
2009-05-05	2009-05-04	2009 JF1	0.00196 AU (293,000 km; 182,000 mi)	0.76	7.6–17	27.7	Yes	data · 2009 JF_{1}
2009-05-13	2009-05-12	2009 JL_{2}	0.00177 AU (265,000 km; 165,000 mi)	0.69	17–38	26.0		data · 2009 JL_{2}
2009-06-01	2009-05-31	2009 KR_{21}	0.00190 AU (284,000 km; 177,000 mi)	0.74	12–27	26.7	Yes	data · 2009 KR_{21}
2009-10-01	2009-10-02	2009 TB	0.000464 AU (69,400 km; 43,100 mi)	0.18	3.8–8.6	29.2		data · 2009 TB
2009-10-05	2009-10-09	2009 TD_{17}	0.00173 AU (259,000 km; 161,000 mi)	0.67	7.7–17	27.7		data · 2009 TD_{17}
2009-10-08	2009-10-10	2009 TU	0.00204 AU (305,000 km; 190,000 mi)	0.79	9.2–21	27.3		data · 2009 TU
2009-10-17	2009-10-15	2009 TM_{8}	0.00232 AU (347,000 km; 216,000 mi)	0.90	5.6–12	28.4		data · 2009 TM_{8}
2009-11-06	2009-11-06	2009 VA	0.000137 AU (20,500 km; 12,700 mi)	0.05	5.1–11	28.6		data · 2009 VA
2009-11-12	2009-11-10	2009 VZ_{39}	0.00174 AU (260,000 km; 162,000 mi)	0.68	6.5–14	28.1	Yes? (Note: The orbit of 2009 VZ_{39} is known quite poorly- it could have passed as closely as 0.029 and as far as 3.1 LD from Earth, as well as anything from 3.4 LD to colliding head-on with the Moon. As such, the values are based on the nominal calculations. Considering a fireball would likely be noticed if it had collided with the Moon, as it would have created a crater over 150 meters in diameter, it can probably be concluded that the actual orbit was not too far from the nominal one- with a closest approach somewhere between 0.5 and 0.8 lunar distances.)	data · 2009 VZ_{39}
2009-11-15	2009-11-18	2009 WP_{6}	0.00176 AU (263,000 km; 164,000 mi)	0.69	12–26	26.8		data · 2009 WP_{6}
2009-11-16	2009-11-18	2009 WQ_{6}	0.00235 AU (352,000 km; 218,000 mi)	0.91	3.8–8.6	29.2		data · 2009 WQ_{6}
2009-11-20	2009-11-19	2009 WJ_{6}	0.00119 AU (178,000 km; 111,000 mi)	0.46	8.8–20	27.4		data · 2009 WJ_{6}
2009-11-24	2009-11-23	2009 WV_{51}	0.00101 AU (151,000 km; 94,000 mi)	0.39	10–23	27.1		data · 2009 WV_{51}

=== Warning times by size ===
This table visualizes the warning times of the close approaches listed in the above table, depending on the size of the asteroid. The sizes of each pie chart show the relative sizes of the asteroids to scale. For comparison, the approximate size of a person is also shown. This is based around the absolute magnitude of each asteroid, an approximate measure of size based on brightness.

Absolute magnitude H ≥ 30 (smallest)

None

Absolute magnitude 30 > H ≥ 29

Silhouette of man standing and facing forward

(size of a person for comparison)

Absolute magnitude 28-29

Absolute magnitude 28 > H ≥ 27

Absolute magnitude 27 > H ≥ 26

Absolute magnitude 26 > H ≥ 25

- After closest approach: 0 (0.0%)
- < 24 hours before: 0 (0.0%)
- up to 7 days before: 1 (100.0%)
- > one week before: 0 (0.0%)
- > 7 weeks before: 0 (0.0%)
- > one year before: 0 (0.0%)

Absolute magnitude 25 > H (largest)

None

== Additional examples ==
An example list of near-Earth asteroids that passed more than 1 lunar distance (384,400 km or 0.00256 AU) from Earth in 2009.

- (136849) 1998 CS1 (~990 meters in diameter) passed 11.33 Lunar distances (4.4 million km) from Earth on 17 January 2009.
- (208023) 1999 AQ_{10} (~285 meters in diameter) passed 4.39 Lunar distances (1.7 million km) from Earth on 18 February 2009.
- 2009 FW_{4} (~41 meters in diameter) passed 2.82 Lunar distances (1.1 million km) from Earth on 17 March 2009.
- 2009 DO_{111} (~95 meters in diameter) passed 1.22 Lunar distances (468,000 km) from Earth on 20 March 2009.
- (410777) 2009 FD (472 meters in diameter) passed 1.62 Lunar distances (624,000 km) from Earth on 27 March 2009.
- (136617) 1994 CC (~990 meters in diameter) passed 6.55 Lunar distances (2.5 million km) from Earth on 10 June 2009.
- 2009 MU (~41 meters in diameter) passed 2.31 Lunar distances (889,000 km) from Earth on 24 June 2009.
- 2009 RY_{3} (~41 meters in diameter) passed 1.94 Lunar distances (745,000 km) from Earth on 11 September 2009.
- 2009 SH_{1} (~5 meters in diameter) may have passed as close as 1.01 Lunar distances (390,000 km) from Earth on 14 September 2009, but the nominal orbit suggests an approach nearer to 2.40 LD (922,000 km).
- (68216) 2001 CV_{26} (1277 meters in diameter) passed 9.79 Lunar distances (3.8 million km) from Earth on 8 October 2009.
- (159402) 1999 AP_{10} (~2067 meters in diameter) passed 29.68 Lunar distances (11.4 million km) from Earth on 20 October 2009.
- 2009 WV_{25} (~54 meters in diameter) passed 2.91 Lunar distances (112,000 km) from Earth on 1 December 2009.

== See also ==
- List of asteroid close approaches to Earth
- List of asteroid close approaches to Earth in 2008
- List of asteroid close approaches to Earth in 2010
