= 2010 AL30 =

Near-Earth asteroid

2010 AL_{30}
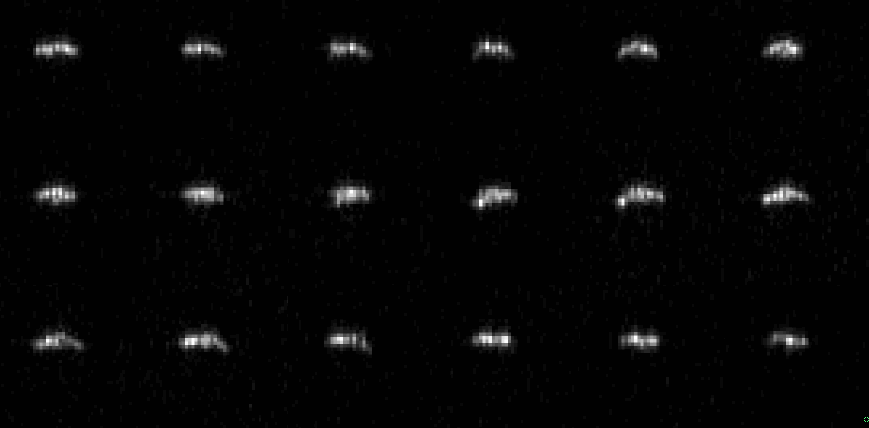
- Goldstone radar collage of asteroid 2010 AL_{30}

Discovery
- Discovery date: January 10, 2010

Designations
- Alternative designations: none
- Minor planet category: Apollo NEO

Orbital characteristics
- Epoch 21 November 2025 (JD 2461000.5)
- Uncertainty parameter 3
- Aphelion: 1.3675 AU (204.58 Gm)
- Perihelion: 0.72418 AU (108.336 Gm)
- Semi-major axis: 1.0458 AU (156.45 Gm)
- Eccentricity: 0.30755
- Orbital period (sidereal): 1.07 yr (390.65 d)
- Average orbital speed: 28.5
- Mean anomaly: 232.456°
- Mean motion: 0° 55^{m} 17.508^{s} /day
- Inclination: 3.8313°
- Longitude of ascending node: 112.338°
- Argument of perihelion: 97.822°
- Earth MOID: 0.000943817 AU (141,193.0 km)
- Jupiter MOID: 3.59553 AU (537.884 Gm)

Physical characteristics
- Dimensions: ~30 meters (elongated)
- Synodic rotation period: 0.14660 h (0.006108 d)
- Spectral type: ?
- Absolute magnitude (H): 27.2

2010 AL_{30} is a near-Earth asteroid that was discovered on 10 January 2010 at Grove Creek Observatory, Australia.

Italian scientists Ernesto Guido and Giovanni Sostero told RIA Novosti that it had an orbital period of almost exactly one year and might be a spent rocket booster. However, it was determined that it is a near-Earth asteroid. On January 13, 2010 at 1246 UT it passed Earth at 0.0008624 AU (129,010 km; 80,170 mi), about 1/3 of the distance from the Earth to the Moon (or 0.33 LD).

Based an estimated diameter of 10–15 m (33–49 ft), if 2010 AL_{30} had entered the Earth's atmosphere, it would have created a meteor air burst equivalent to between 50 kT and 100 kT (kilotons of TNT). The Nagasaki "Fat Man" atom bomb had a yield between 13–18 kT.

It has an uncertainty parameter of 3 and has been observed by radar. Radar observations show the asteroid is elongated and is about 30 meters in diameter. It may be a contact binary.

== See also ==
- 2010 GA6
- List of asteroid close approaches to Earth
