= (277475) 2005 WK4 =

Near-Earth asteroid

(277475) 2005 WK_{4}
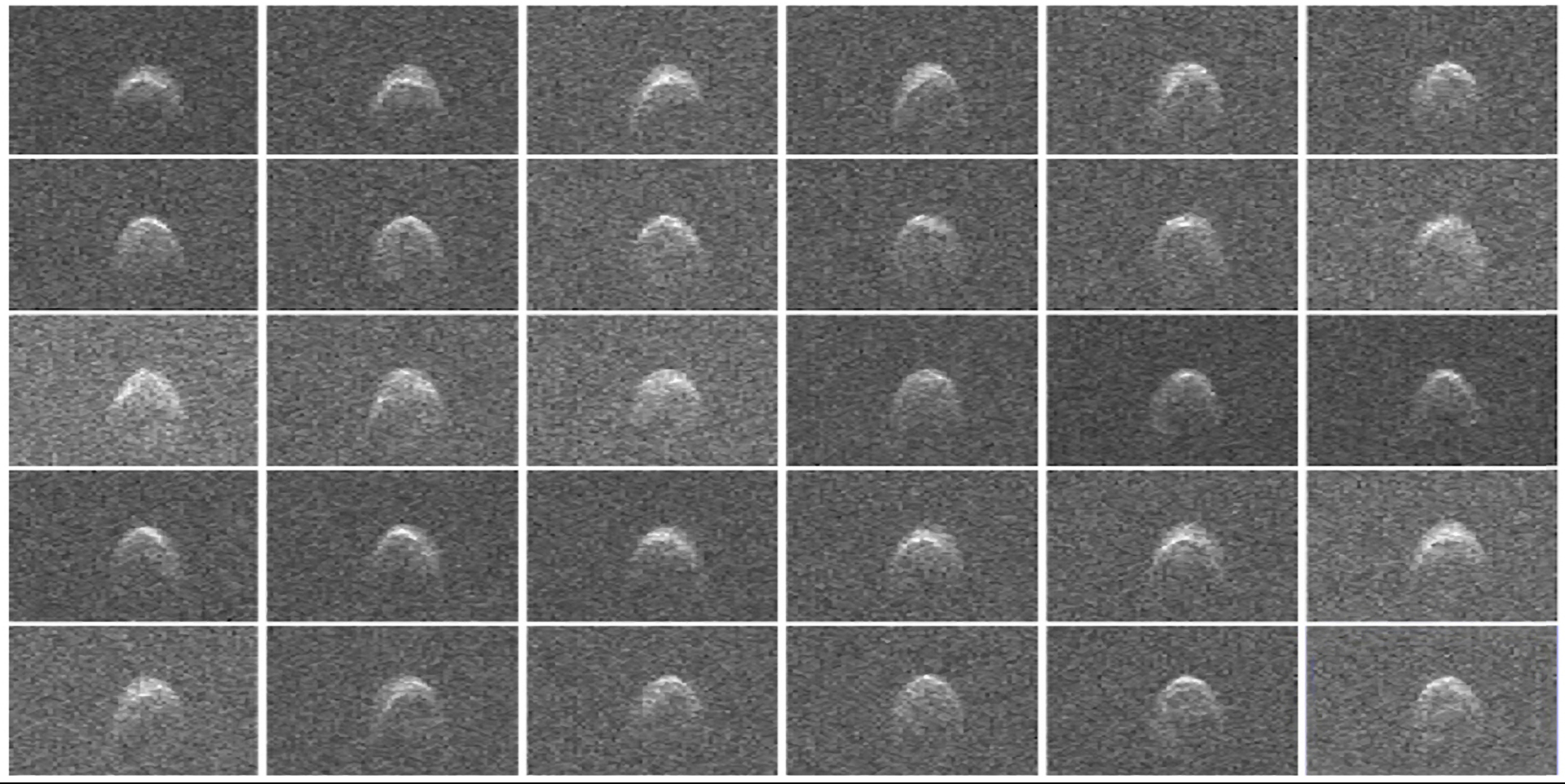
- 2005 WK_{4} imaged 30 times by radar at Goldstone on 8 August 2013

Discovery
- Discovered by: Siding Spring Srvy.
- Discovery site: Siding Spring Obs.
- Discovery date: 27 November 2005

Designations
- Minor planet category: Apollo · NEO · PHA

Orbital characteristics
- Epoch 4 September 2017 (JD 2458000.5)
- Uncertainty parameter 0
- Observation arc: 8.71 yr (3,180 days)
- Aphelion: 1.2506 AU
- Perihelion: 0.7707 AU
- Semi-major axis: 1.0106 AU
- Eccentricity: 0.2374
- Orbital period (sidereal): 1.02 yr (371 days)
- Mean anomaly: 81.040°
- Mean motion: 0° 58^{m} 12.36^{s} / day
- Inclination: 9.8433°
- Longitude of ascending node: 138.14°
- Argument of perihelion: 74.063°
- Earth MOID: 0.0037 AU · 1.4 LD

Physical characteristics
- Dimensions: 0.25±0.05 km (Note: Benner (2013): radiometric observations: mean diameter 0.25±0.05 km; rotation period 2.7±0.1 hours. Summary figures at the LCDB; also see NASA news report); 0.284 km (calculated)
- Synodic rotation period: 2.595±0.002 h 2.7±0.1 h 2.73±0.05 h
- Geometric albedo: 0.20 (assumed)
- Spectral type: Sk · S (assumed); B–V = 0.677±0.025; V–R = 0.446±0.019; V–I = 0.750±0.024
- Absolute magnitude (H): 20.1

(277475) 2005 WK_{4} is a stony, sub-kilometer asteroid, classified as a near-Earth object and potentially hazardous asteroid of the Apollo group that passed Earth within 8.2 lunar distances on 8 August 2013. It was discovered on 27 November 2005, by astronomers of the Siding Spring Survey at Siding Spring Observatory, Australia.

== Description ==
In August 2013, 2005 WK_{4} was radar-imaged by the Deep Space Network dish at Goldstone Observatory, United States, and had been observed previously at Arecibo Observatory in July 2012 (this was not a close approach though).

=== Physical characteristics ===
2005 WK_{4} measures approximately 250 meters in diameter, and has a rotation period of 2.595 hours. Its spectral type is that of an Sk-subtype, which transitions from the stony S-type to the uncommon K-type asteroids.

== See also ==
- List of asteroid close approaches to Earth in 2013
