= (163364) 2002 OD20 =

Near-Earth asteroid

(163364) 2002 OD_{20}
Discovery
- Discovered by: NEAT
- Discovery site: Palomar Obs.
- Discovery date: 21 July 2002

Designations
- Minor planet category: NEO · PHA · Apollo

Orbital characteristics
- Epoch 13 January 2016 (JD 2457400.5)
- Uncertainty parameter 0
- Observation arc: 5068 days (13.88 yr)
- Aphelion: 1.8697 AU (279.70 Gm)
- Perihelion: 0.86152 AU (128.882 Gm)
- Semi-major axis: 1.3656 AU (204.29 Gm)
- Eccentricity: 0.36914 (e)
- Orbital period (sidereal): 1.60 yr (582.90 d)
- Mean anomaly: 267.34°
- Mean motion: 0° 37^{m} 3.36^{s} / day
- Inclination: 4.1884°
- Longitude of ascending node: 259.99°
- Argument of perihelion: 275.24°
- Earth MOID: 0.0261628 AU (3.91390 Gm)

Physical characteristics
- Mean diameter: 0.46–1.0 km
- Synodic rotation period: 2.420 h (0.1008 d)
- Absolute magnitude (H): 18.8

(163364) 2002 OD_{20} is an asteroid, classified as a near-Earth object and potentially hazardous asteroid of the Apollo group, likely smaller than one kilometer in diameter.

It was scheduled to be observed by Goldstone radar in May 2013. It has a well determined orbit and made a close approach to Earth on 23 May 2013, at a distance of 0.0387 AU (5,790,000 km; 3,600,000 mi). It is due to make another close pass on 23 May 2131, coming as close as 0.0248 AU. It was discovered on 21 July 2002 by astronomers of the Near-Earth Asteroid Tracking survey at Palomar Observatory in California. With an absolute magnitude of 18.8, the diameter is estimated to between 460 and 1030 meters.
