= 2010 TD54 =

Near-Earth micro-asteroid

2010 TD_{54}
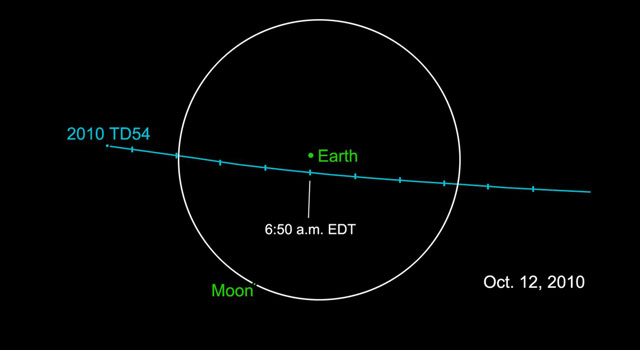
- Orbital diagram of 2010 TD_{54} during its near-Earth encounter on 12 Oct 2010

Discovery
- Discovered by: Mount Lemmon Srvy.
- Discovery site: Mount Lemmon Obs.
- Discovery date: 9 October 2010

Designations
- Minor planet category: NEO · Apollo

Orbital characteristics
- Epoch 21 November 2025 (JD 2461000.5)
- Uncertainty parameter 6
- Observation arc: 3 days
- Aphelion: 3.2371 AU
- Perihelion: 0.7053 AU
- Semi-major axis: 1.9712 AU
- Eccentricity: 0.6422
- Orbital period (sidereal): 2.77 yr (1,011 days)
- Mean anomaly: 147.92°
- Mean motion: 0° 21^{m} 21.96^{s} / day
- Inclination: 4.2945°
- Longitude of ascending node: 18.123°
- Argument of perihelion: 76.641°
- Earth MOID: 0.001444 AU; 0.562 LD

Physical characteristics
- Dimensions: 5 m 5–10 m
- Synodic rotation period: 0.01167 h (dated); 0.0229317 h (Note: Ryan (2011) web: rotation period 0.0229317±0.0000002 hours with a brightness amplitude of 0.92±0.03 mag. Summary figures for (2010 TD54) at the LCDB and Bill Ryan at Magdalena Ridge Observatory)
- Geometric albedo: 0.20 (assumed)
- Spectral type: Srv
- Absolute magnitude (H): 28.9

2010 TD_{54} is a tiny asteroid and fast rotator, classified as a near-Earth object of the Apollo group, approximately 5 meters in diameter. It was first observed by the Mount Lemmon Survey in October 2010, when the asteroid crossed through the Earth-moon system and had a close encounter with Earth.

== Orbit and classification ==
2010 TD_{54} orbits the Sun at a distance of 0.7–3.2 AU once every 2 years and 9 months (1,011 days). Its orbit has an eccentricity of 0.64 and an inclination of 4° with respect to the ecliptic.

The body's observation arc begins with its first observations by the Mount Lemmon Survey and only spans over a period of 3 days until 12 October 2010. It has been observed since then.

=== Close approach ===
2010 TD_{54} made its closest approach at 10:51, 12 October 2010 UTC (6:51 EDT a.m.) at 0.000346 AU (51,800 km; 32,200 mi). It is one of the closest known approaches of an asteroid to Earth, at which time the object appeared at a magnitude of 14. It was first observed by of the Catalina Sky Survey's telescopes north of Tucson, Arizona on 9 October 2010.

It has an Earth minimum orbit intersection distance of 0.00144418 AU (216,000 km; 134,000 mi), which corresponds to 0.562 lunar distance. It was removed from the Sentry Risk Table on 11 October 2010. The asteroid may have passed 0.0009 AU (135,000 km; 83,700 mi) from Earth in October 1979, but the nominal orbit suggests it passed millions of kilometres from Earth in 1979.

== Physical characteristics ==
2010 TD_{54} is a stony asteroid, characterized as a Srv subtype.

=== Rotation period ===
In November 2010, a rotational light curve of 2010 TD_{54} was obtained from photometric observations, which showed that the asteroid is a fast rotator. Light curve analysis gave a well-defined rotation period of 0.0229317 hours (1 minute and 23 seconds) with a brightness amplitude of 0.92 magnitude (U=3). A high amplitude typically indicates that the body has an irregular, elongated rather than spherical shape. This result supersedes a previously obtained lightcurve with a shorter period of 0.01167 hours (U=1).

=== Diameter and albedo ===
The Collaborative Asteroid Lightcurve Link assumes a standard albedo for stony asteroids of 0.20 and calculates a diameter of 5 metres (16 feet) based on an absolute magnitude of 28.9. NASA's press release gave an estimated diameter of 5 to 10 meters (16 to 33 feet).

== See also ==
- List of asteroid close approaches to Earth, for other close approaches
- List of asteroid close approaches to Earth in 2010
