= 2013 PJ10 =

Near-Earth asteroid

2013 PJ_{10}
Discovery
- Discovered by: Astronomical Observatory of Mallorca
- Discovery site: La Sagra, Spain
- Discovery date: 4 August 2013

Designations
- Alternative designations: MPO 292202
- Minor planet category: Apollo NEO

Orbital characteristics
- Epoch 4 September 2017 (JD 2458000.5)
- Uncertainty parameter 2
- Observation arc: 35 d
- Aphelion: 1.59516 AU (238.633 Gm)
- Perihelion: 0.97436 AU (145.762 Gm)
- Semi-major axis: 1.28476 AU (192.197 Gm)
- Eccentricity: 0.24160
- Orbital period (sidereal): 1.46 yr (531.902 d); 1.46 yr
- Mean anomaly: 312.88°
- Mean motion: 0° 40^{m} 36.84^{s} /day
- Inclination: 8.26482°
- Longitude of ascending node: 312.343°
- Argument of perihelion: 321.23°
- Earth MOID: 0.00263218 AU (393,769 km)
- Mercury MOID: 0.5108 AU (76,410,000 km)
- Jupiter MOID: 3.51056 AU (525.172 Gm)

Physical characteristics
- Dimensions: 50 m
- Sidereal rotation period: 0.724 hr
- Absolute magnitude (H): 24.6

2013 PJ_{10} is a near-Earth asteroid that was discovered on 4 August 2013 in Observatorio Astronómico de La Sagra, with an estimated diameter of about 50 meters. At 02.18 GMT, 4 August 2013, this asteroid flew at a minimum distance from the Earth (371.4 thousand kilometers), accounting for 0.96 average radius of the lunar orbit, but until 2180 it will not approach the Earth closer than 3.2 million miles.

== See also ==
- 2013 EC
- (837253) 2013 FW13
- 2013 ET
