= 2010 GA6 =

Near-Earth micro-asteroid

2010 GA_{6}
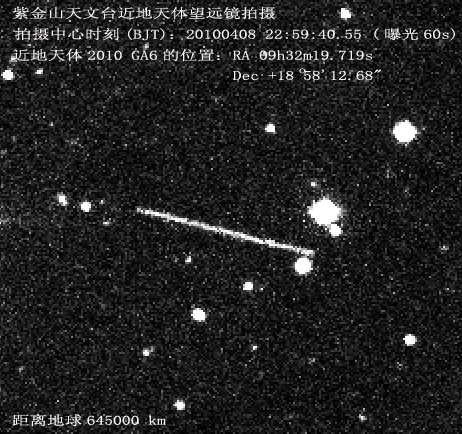
- 2010 GA_{6}, captured by Purple Mountain Observatory in 8 April 2010

Discovery
- Discovered by: CSS
- Discovery site: Mount Lemmon Obs.
- Discovery date: 5 April 2010

Designations
- Minor planet category: NEO · Apollo; Mars-crosser

Orbital characteristics
- Epoch 21 November 2025 (JD 2461000.5)
- Uncertainty parameter 6
- Observation arc: 4 days
- Aphelion: 3.6846 AU
- Perihelion: 0.9271 AU
- Semi-major axis: 2.3059 AU
- Eccentricity: 0.5979
- Orbital period (sidereal): 3.50 yr (1,279 days)
- Mean anomaly: 155.48°
- Mean motion: 0° 16^{m} 53.4^{s} / day
- Inclination: 9.7549°
- Longitude of ascending node: 197.62°
- Argument of perihelion: 34.323°
- Earth MOID: 0.0061 AU (2.4 LD)

Physical characteristics
- Mean diameter: 22 m (72 ft); 19 m (est. at 0.20); 36 m (est. at 0.057)
- Absolute magnitude (H): 25.9 · 26.0

2010 GA_{6} is a micro-asteroid on an eccentric orbit, classified as a near-Earth object of the Apollo group. It was first observed on 5 April 2010, by astronomers of the Catalina Sky Survey at Mount Lemmon Observatory, Arizona, United States, four days before a close approach to Earth at 1.1 lunar distances on 9 April 2010. It has not been observed since.

== Orbit and classification ==
2010 GA_{6} is an Apollo asteroid. Apollo's cross the orbit of Earth and are the largest group of near-Earth objects with nearly 10 thousand known members. It orbits the Sun in the inner main-belt at a distance of 0.93–3.68 AU once every 3 years and 6 months (1,279 days; semi-major axis of 2.31 AU). Its orbit has a high eccentricity of 0.60 and an inclination of 10° with respect to the ecliptic. With an aphelion of 3.68 AU, it is also a Mars-crossing asteroid, as it crosses the orbit of the Red Planet at 1.666 AU.

=== Close approach ===
With a 1-day observation arc, 2010 GA_{6} had a 1 in 6 million chance of impacting Earth in 2074. It was removed from the Sentry Risk Table on 8 April 2010. The asteroid has now a minimum orbital intersection distance with Earth of 908,000 km; 564,000 mi (0.00607 AU), which corresponds to 2.4 lunar distances, and is notably larger than the nominal distance of its 2010-flyby.

==== 2010 flyby ====
On 9 April 2010, 02:07 UT, the asteroid passed Earth at a nominal distance of 434,000 km; 270,000 mi (0.0029 AU) or 1.1 lunar distances. A stony asteroid 22 meters in diameter can be expected to create an air burst with the equivalent of 300 kilotons of TNT at an altitude of 21 kilometers (69,000 ft). Generally only asteroids larger than 35 meters across pose a threat to a town or city. There are no projection of future close approaches to Earth available.

== Physical characteristics ==
According to NASA astronomers, 2010 GA_{6} measures approximately 22 meters (72 ft) in diameter. Based on a generic magnitude-to-diameter conversion, the asteroid measures between 19 and 36 meters in diameter, for an absolute magnitude of 22.6, and an assumed albedo between 0.057 and 0.20, which represent typical values for carbonaceous and stony asteroids, respectively.

== Numbering and naming ==
This minor planet has neither been numbered nor named.

== See also ==
- 2010 AL30
- 367943 Duende
