= 2010 RF12 =

Small risk–listed near-Earth asteroid

2010 RF_{12}
Discovery
- Discovered by: Mount Lemmon Srvy.
- Discovery site: Mount Lemmon Obs.
- Discovery date: 5 September 2010

Designations
- Minor planet category: NEO · Apollo

Orbital characteristics
- Epoch 2025-Nov-21 (JD 2461000.5)
- Uncertainty parameter 0 (MPC) 2 (JPL)
- Observation arc: 11.98 years
- Aphelion: 1.261 AU
- Perihelion: 0.86158 AU
- Semi-major axis: 1.0615 AU
- Eccentricity: 0.18831
- Orbital period (sidereal): 1.094 yr (399.445 d)
- Mean anomaly: 266.1°
- Mean motion: 0° 54^{m} 4.68^{s} / day
- Inclination: 0.88267°
- Longitude of ascending node: 163.69°
- Time of perihelion: 2026-Mar-05
- Argument of perihelion: 267.44°
- Earth MOID: 0.00060 AU (90 thousand km; 0.23 LD)

Physical characteristics
- Mean diameter: 7 m 6–12 meters (CNEOS)
- Absolute magnitude (H): 28.42

2010 RF_{12} is a very small asteroid, classified as a near-Earth object of the Apollo group, that passed between Earth and the Moon on 8 September 2010, at 21:12 UTC, approaching Earth within 79,000 kilometres (49,000 mi) above Antarctica. The asteroid was discovered by the Mount Lemmon Survey near Tucson, Arizona on 5 September 2010 along with 2010 RX30. Based on a short 7-day observation arc from that apparation, it was listed for 12 years on the Sentry Risk Table as the asteroid with the greatest known probability (5%) of impacting Earth. (Note: Many small and harmless asteroids (less than ~10 meters in diameter) impact Earth every year but very few are discovered and predicted, see Asteroid impact prediction.) 2010 RF_{12} was rediscovered in August 2022, and now has a 12-year observation arc and a much better known orbit. As of the December 2022 solution which accounts for nongravitational forces, there is a 1-in-10 chance of an Earth impact on 5 September 2095.

Nominal Earth Approach on 6 September 2095 with a 12-year observation arc
Date	Impact probability	JPL Horizons nominal geocentric distance (AU)	uncertainty region (3-sigma)
2095-09-06 00:06 ± 00:20	1:10	0.00035 AU (52 thousand km)	±180 thousand km

In 2023, 2010 RF_{12} was identified as a possible dark comet. Dark comets are asteroids that exhibit comet-like acceleration, but visually appear as asteroids, with no coma or tail. Astronomers who study them believe the acceleration is caused by outgassing on the sunlit side.

== Description ==
NASA's Near Earth Program estimates its size to be 7 meters (23 feet) in diameter with a mass of around 500 tonnes. 2010 RF_{12} will make many more close approaches to Earth. Around 6 September 2095 it will pass 52000±180000 km from Earth. An asteroid roughly 7-meters in diameter impacting Earth would cause very little danger of harm, but a rather impressive fireball is expected (estimated in the risk table as nearly 9 KT of energy release) as the rock airbursts in the upper atmosphere. Pebble sized fragments would likely fall to the ground at terminal velocity. The power of the airburst would be somewhere between the 2–4 m Sutter's Mill meteorite and the 17 m Chelyabinsk meteor (which had 440 KT equivalent energy). The approach in 2096 is poorly known because it is dependent on the September 2095 Earth approach.

Virtual impactors with a 12-year observation arc
Date	Impact probability (1 in)	JPL Horizons nominal geocentric distance (AU)	NEODyS nominal geocentric distance (AU)	MPC nominal geocentric distance (AU)	Find_Orb nominal geocentric distance (AU)	uncertainty region (3-sigma)
2095-09-05 23:46	10	0.00035 AU (52 thousand km)	0.0008 AU (120 thousand km)	0.00066 AU (99 thousand km)	0.00087 AU (130,000 km)	±180 thousand km
2096-09-04 21:50	22000	0.84 AU (126 million km)	0.18 AU (27 million km)	0.36 AU (54 million km)	0.19 AU (28 million km)	±414 million km

On 17 February 2059 the asteroid will pass within 3.5 million km from Earth and reach about apparent magnitude 22.6 by late February. On 10 September 1915 it passed 463000±30000 km from Earth.

== See also ==
- 2010 RX30, a similar-sized asteroid that passed Earth the same day
- 2000 SG344, another near-Earth asteroid (may be Saturn V stage IV rocket booster)
- 2006 JY26
- Asteroid impact prediction
- List of asteroid close approaches to Earth, for other close approaches
- Earth-grazing fireball
- Meteoroid
- Dark comet
