= (285263) 1998 QE2 =

Near-Earth asteroid

(285263) 1998 QE_{2}
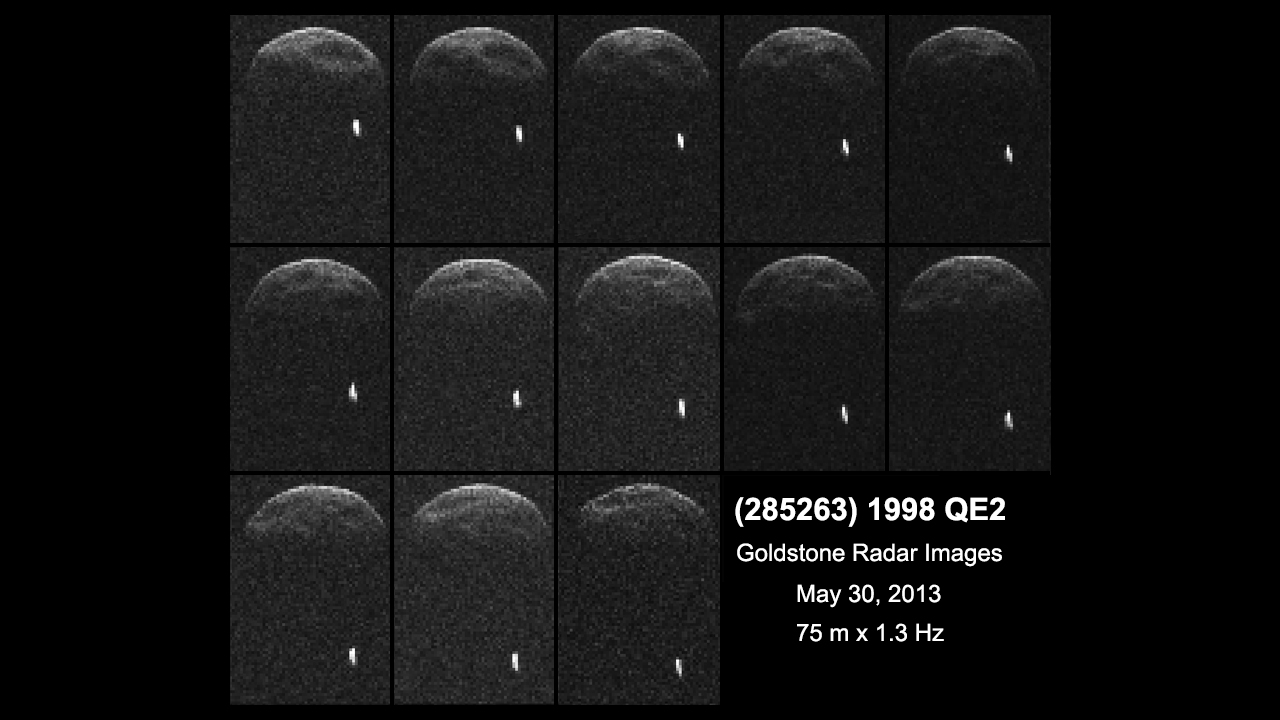
- First radar images of 1998 QE_{2} taken at Goldstone on 30 May 2013

Discovery
- Discovered by: LINEAR
- Discovery site: Lincoln Lab's ETS
- Discovery date: 19 August 1998

Designations
- Minor planet category: Amor; NEO; PHA

Orbital characteristics
- Epoch 4 September 2017 (JD 2458000.5)
- Uncertainty parameter 0
- Observation arc: 19.24 yr (7,029 days)
- Aphelion: 3.8092 AU
- Perihelion: 1.0377 AU
- Semi-major axis: 2.4234 AU
- Eccentricity: 0.5718
- Orbital period (sidereal): 3.77 yr (1,378 days)
- Mean anomaly: 49.758°
- Mean motion: 0° 15^{m} 40.32^{s} / day
- Inclination: 12.859°
- Longitude of ascending node: 250.14°
- Argument of perihelion: 345.65°
- Known satellites: 1 (Note: Brozovic (2013) – Companion discovered 2013 May 29 using radar observations. Announced 2013 May 30. Primary: rotation period 4 hours (upper limit); diameter of 2.7 kilometers. Summary figures at the LCDB and NASA news NASA Radar Reveals Asteroid Has Its Own Moon, from 30 May 2013.)
- Earth MOID: 0.0345 AU (13.4 LD)
- T_{Jupiter}: 3.239

Physical characteristics
- Mean diameter: 1.08 km (calculated); 2.7 km; 2.75 km; 3.2±0.3 km
- Synodic rotation period: 2.726±0.001 h; 4 h (upper limit); 4.749±0.001 h (Note: Pravec (2013) web: photometry from June 2013. Rotation period 4.749±0.001 hours with a brightness amplitude of 0.19±0.02 mag. Quality Code of (3). Summary figures for at the LCDB and Pravec, P.; Wolf, M.; Sarounova, L. (2013) obtained by the NEO Photometric Program and collaborating projects); 4.751±0.002 h; 5.39±0.02 h
- Geometric albedo: 0.06; 0.20 (assumed)
- Spectral type: S (assumed)
- Absolute magnitude (H): 16.4; 16.98±0.02; 17.2; 17.3

(285263) 1998 QE_{2} is a dark asteroid and synchronous binary system, classified as a near-Earth object and potentially hazardous asteroid of the Amor group, approximately 3 kilometers in diameter. It was discovered on 19 August 1998, by astronomers of the LINEAR program at Lincoln Laboratory's Experimental Test Site near Socorro, New Mexico, in the United States. Its sub-kilometer minor-planet moon was discovered by radar on 30 May 2013.

== Classification and orbital characteristics ==
As an Amor asteroid, the orbit of 1998 QE_{2} is entirely beyond Earth's orbit. The asteroid orbits the Sun at a distance of 1.0–3.8 AU once every 3 years and 9 months (1,378 days; semi-major axis of 2.42 AU). Its orbit has an eccentricity of 0.57 and an inclination of 13° with respect to the ecliptic. The Earth minimum orbit intersection distance with the orbit of the asteroid is 0.035 AU (5,200,000 km; 3,300,000 mi), which translates into 13.4 lunar distances. As with many members of the Amor group, this asteroid has an aphelion beyond the orbit of Mars (at 1.66 AU) which also makes it a Mars-crosser.

The sooty surface of 1998 QE_{2} suggested that it might have previously been a comet that experienced a close encounter with the Sun. However, the Tisserand parameter with respect to Jupiter (T_{J}=3.2) does not make it obvious whether 1998 QE_{2} was ever a comet, since cometary T_{J} values are typically below 3.

=== Earth approach ===
On 31 May 2013, 1998 QE_{2} approached within 0.039 AU (5,800,000 km; 3,600,000 mi) (15 lunar distances) of Earth at 20:59 UT (4:59 pm EDT). This was the closest approach the asteroid will make to Earth for at least the next two centuries. It is a very strong radar target for Goldstone from May 30 to June 9 and will be one for Arecibo from June 6 to June 12. At its closest approach the asteroid had an apparent magnitude of 11 and therefore required a small telescope to be seen.

Integrating the orbital solution shows the asteroid passed 0.08 AU (12,000,000 km; 7,400,000 mi) from Earth on 8 June 1975 with an apparent magnitude of about 13.9. The next notable close approach will be 27 May 2221, when the asteroid will pass Earth at a distance of 0.038 AU (5,700,000 km; 3,500,000 mi).

== Satellite ==
Goldstone radar observations on 29 May 2013 discovered that 1998 QE_{2} is orbited by a minor-planet moon approximately 600–800 meters in diameter. In radar images, the satellite appears brighter than 1998 QE_{2} because it is rotating significantly more slowly, which compresses the radar return of the satellite along the Doppler axis. This makes the satellite appear narrow and bright compared to 1998 QE_{2}. The satellite orbits the primary every 32 hours with a maximum separation of 6.4 kilometers (4.0 mi). Once the satellite's orbit is well determined, astronomers and astrophysicists will be able to determine the mass and density of 1998 QE_{2}.

== Physical characteristics ==
=== Surface, albedo and composition ===
The surface of 1998 QE_{2} is covered with a sooty substance, making it optically dark with a geometric albedo of 0.06, meaning it absorbs 94% of the light that hits it, which is indicative for a carbonaceous surface of a C-type asteroid. The asteroid is covered with craters and is dark, red, and primitive.

=== Diameter ===
With a diameter between 2.7 and 3.2 kilometers, 1998 QE_{2} is one of largest known potentially hazardous asteroid (see PHA-list). Conversely, the Collaborative Asteroid Lightcurve Link assumes a standard albedo for stony asteroids of 0.20 and calculates a diameter of 1.08 kilometers based on an absolute magnitude of 17.2.

== Gallery ==
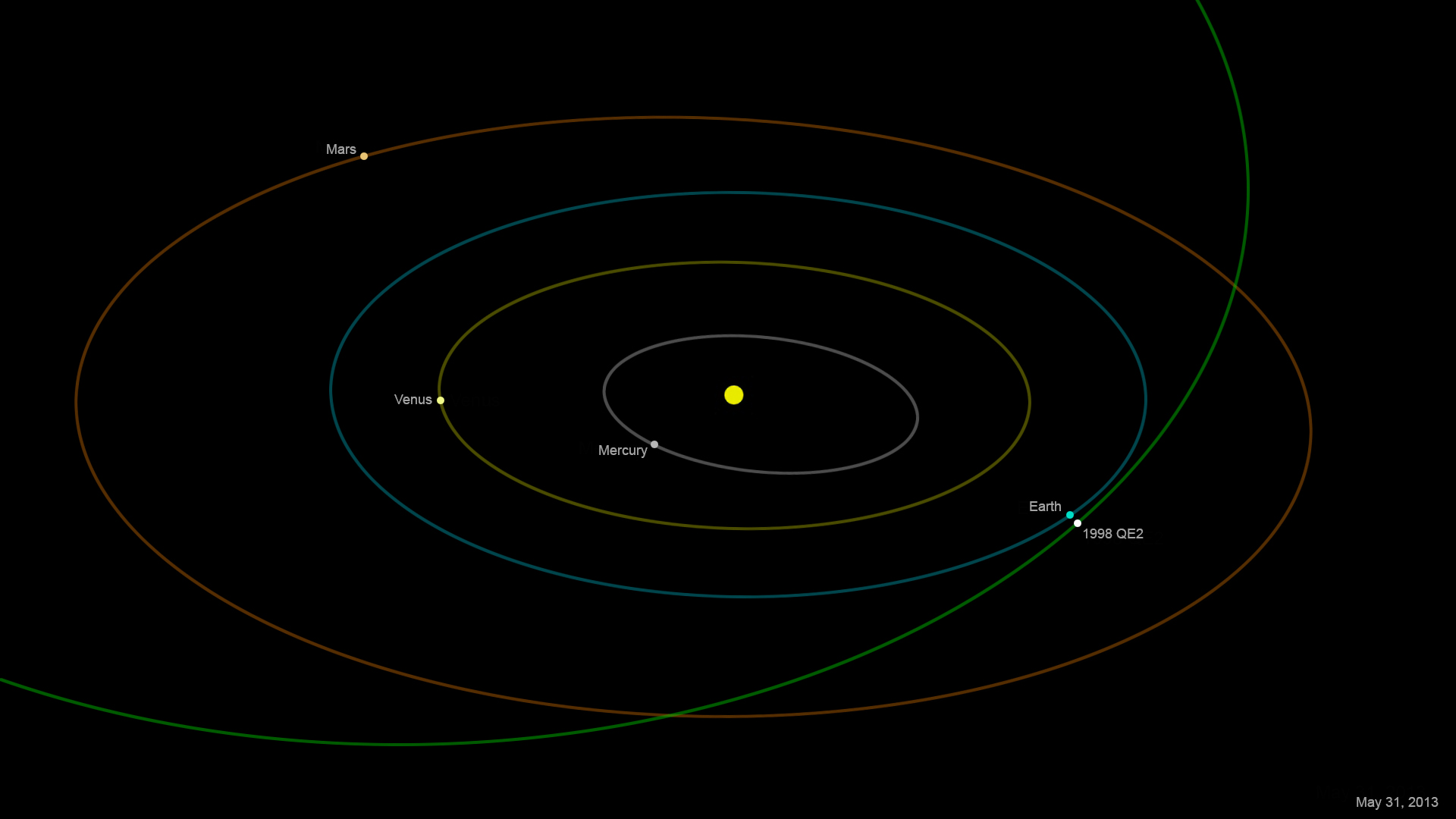
Orbit of 1998 QE_{2} on 31 May 2013

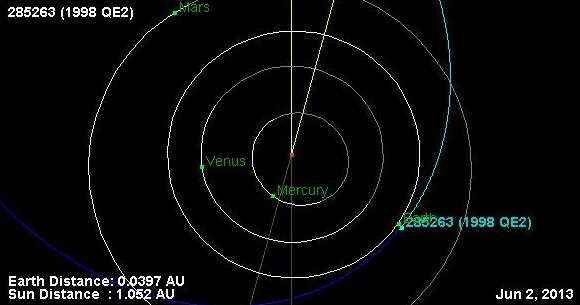
and 2 June 2013
