= 2010 RX30 =

Near-Earth micro-asteroid

2010 RX_{30}
Discovery
- Discovered by: Mt. Lemmon Survey
- Discovery site: Summerhaven, Arizona, USA
- Discovery date: 5 September 2010

Designations
- Alternative designations: MPO 279189
- Minor planet category: NEO · Aten

Orbital characteristics
- Epoch 21 November 2025 (JD 2461000.5)
- Uncertainty parameter 1
- Observation arc: 1073 d
- Aphelion: 1.15353 AU (172.566 Gm)
- Perihelion: 0.50816 AU (76.020 Gm)
- Semi-major axis: 0.83084 AU (124.292 Gm)
- Eccentricity: 0.38839
- Orbital period (sidereal): 0.76 yr (276.616 d); 0.76 yr
- Mean anomaly: 283.70°
- Mean motion: 1° 18^{m} 5.184^{s} /day
- Inclination: 5.06450°
- Longitude of ascending node: 165.929°
- Argument of perihelion: 320.04°
- Earth MOID: 0.000872092 AU (130,463.1 km)
- Mercury MOID: 0.17843 AU (26,693,000 km)
- Jupiter MOID: 3.91383 AU (585.501 Gm)

Physical characteristics
- Dimensions: 12 m
- Mass: 2.5×10^{6} kg
- Absolute magnitude (H): 27.1

2010 RX_{30} is a tiny near-Earth asteroid that passed within 248,000 kilometres (154,000 mi) over Earth's surface at 09:51 UTC on 8 September 2010. It is an Aten asteroid estimated to be around 12 metres (39 ft) in diameter with a mass of 2,500 tonnes (5,500,000 lb). It was discovered by the Catalina Sky Survey near Tucson, Arizona, United States alongside 2010 RF12, a small asteroid that also encountered Earth on 8 September. Both asteroids were discovered three days prior to encounter on 5 September, and they were reported to the Minor Planet Center (MPC) that day. Asteroids similar in size to 2010 RX_{30} and 2010 RF_{12} are expected to pass within the Moon's orbit every day, though they typically remain undiscovered.

== See also ==
- List of asteroid close approaches to Earth
