= 367943 Duende =

Near-Earth object

- Goldstone radar image of Duende on 15–16 February 2013

Discovery
- Discovered by: OAM
- Discovery site: La Sagra Obs.
- Discovery date: 23 February 2012

Designations
- Pronunciation: /duˈɛndeɪ/ or /ˈdwɛndeɪ/
- Named after: Duende (Iberian/Filipino mythology)
- Alternative designations: 2012 DA_{14}
- Minor planet category: NEO; Aten; Atira; Apollo (pre-2013)

Orbital characteristics
- Epoch 23 March 2018 (JD 2458200.5)
- Uncertainty parameter 0
- Observation arc: 364 days
- Aphelion: 0.9916 AU
- Perihelion: 0.8289 AU
- Semi-major axis: 0.9103 AU
- Eccentricity: 0.0894
- Orbital period (sidereal): 0.87 yr (317 days)
- Mean anomaly: 113.74°
- Mean motion: 1° 8^{m} 5.64^{s} / day
- Inclination: 11.609°
- Longitude of ascending node: 146.96°
- Argument of perihelion: 195.60°
- Earth MOID: 9.52648×10^{−5} AU (0.037 LD)

Physical characteristics
- Dimensions: 20 m × 40 m (elongated)
- Mean diameter: 18 m; 45–50 m; 47 m (calculated)
- Synodic rotation period: 8 h (lower limit) (Note: rotation period of at least 8 hours (lower limit). Radiometric observations from 16 February 2013. No Quality Code given. Summary figures for (367943) Duende at LCDB); 8.95±0.08 h; 9.1±0.5 h (Note: Lightcurve plot of 2012 DA14 (367943 Duende), Bruce L. Gary, Hereford Arizona Observatory, (2013). Period of 9.1±0.5 hours, and a high brightness amplitude of 1.37±0.03. Quality Code of 3-. Summary figures at LCDB); 9.485±0.144 h; 11.0±1.8 h
- Geometric albedo: 0.20 (assumed); 0.44±0.20
- Spectral type: L; S/V
- Apparent magnitude: 7.2 (2013 peak)
- Absolute magnitude (H): 24.0; 24.4 (2012-estimate); 24.78±0.11 (R); 25.0±0.2

367943 Duende (provisional designation 2012 DA_{14}) is a micro-asteroid and a near-Earth object of the Aten and Atira group, approximately 30 meters (98 ft) in diameter. It was discovered by astronomers of the Astronomical Observatory of Mallorca at its robotic La Sagra Observatory in 2012, and named for the duende, a goblin-like creature from Iberian mythology and folklore. Duende is likely an uncommon L-type asteroid and significantly elongated. For an asteroid of its size, it has a relatively long rotation period of 9.485 hours.

On 15 February 2013, Duende passed at a record proximity of 27,700 km (17,200 mi) or 4.3 Earth radii from Earth's surface. Due to its close passage, its orbit was perturbed significantly enough that it changed from an Apollo asteroid to an Aten asteroid. Duende's passage also coincided with the completely unrelated Chelyabinsk meteor, which entered Earth's atmosphere above Russia just 16 hours earlier.

== Discovery and past risk assessments ==
Duende was discovered on 23 February 2012, seven days after passing 0.0174 AU (2,600,000 km; 1,620,000 mi) from Earth, by the La Sagra Observatory in Granada Province, Spain, using a 0.45-m reflector which was remotely operated by amateur astronomers at the Astronomical Observatory of Mallorca.

The still relatively imprecise orbit deduced from the short arc of the 2012 observations already made clear that Duende would pass no closer to Earth's surface than 3.2 Earth radii during its 2013 passage. There was at the time, however, a cumulative risk of 0.033% (1 in 3,030) that Duende would impact Earth during one of its 2026 to 2069 approaches.

== 2013 passage ==
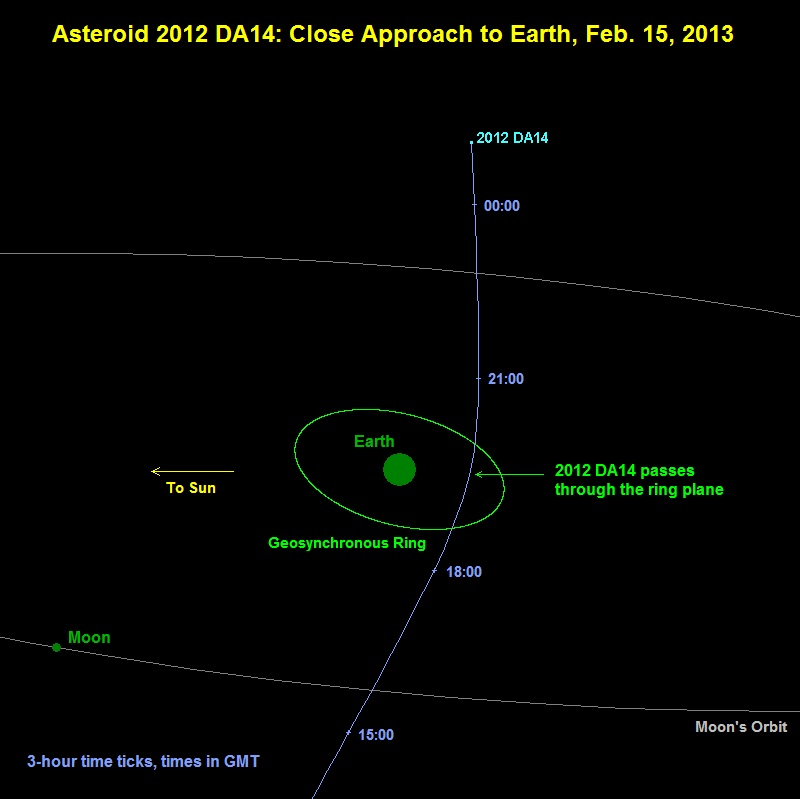
Diagram of Duende passing Earth on 15 February 2013

Animation of Duende's orbit around Sun Duende · Sun · Earth

On 9 January 2013, Duende was observed again by Las Campanas Observatory and the observation arc immediately increased from 79 days to 321 days. On 15 February 2013 at 19:25 UT, Duende passed 0.0002276 AU (34,050 km; 21,160 mi) from the center of Earth, with an uncertainty region of about 0.0000001 AU (15 km; 9.3 mi).

It passed 27,743 kilometers (17,239 mi) above Earth's surface, closer than satellites in geosynchronous orbit. It briefly peaked at an apparent magnitude of roughly 7.2, a factor of a few fainter than would have been visible to the naked eye. The best observation location for the closest approach was Indonesia. Eastern Europe, Asia, and Australia also were well situated to observe Duende during its closest approach.

Duende was not expected to pass any closer than 1950 km to any satellites. Goldstone Observatory observed Duende with radar from February 16 to February 20. Radar observations showed that it is an elongated asteroid with dimensions of 20 by 40 meters (66 by 131 feet). This gives Duende a geometric mean (spherical) diameter equivalent to 28 meters (92 ft).

During the close approach, an observational campaign involving 5 different telescopes in 4 different observatories was carried on in order to get information on the physical properties of this NEO.

Visible and near-Infrared photometry and visible spectroscopy were obtained at Gran Telescopio Canarias, Telescopio Nazionale Galileo and Calar Alto Observatory and put together. The classification using the M4AST online tool says this is an L-type asteroid. Those peculiar asteroids are characterized by a strongly reddish spectrum shortward of 0.8 μm, and a featureless flat spectrum longward of this, with little or no concave-up curvature related to a 1 μm silicon absorption band. Time-series photometry was also obtained in the Observatorio de La Hita (I95) and Observatorio de Sierra Nevada during two consecutive nights (15–16 February 2013). All of this data were co-phased to build a lightcurve of the object. This lightcurve is double-peak and presents large variations in magnitude, implying a very elongated object, which is compatible with radar observations. The amplitude of the lightcurve yields an axial ratio that, together with the long axis of 40 m inferred from the radar images by Goldstone, results in an equivalent diameter of 18 m, much smaller than the estimations before the close-approach.

The rotational period was precisely determined from the lightcurve obtaining a value of 8.95±0.08 h. This value is confirmed with an analysis of all the photometry of this objects reported to the Minor Planet Center. Using data pre and post close approach the authors find that the object suffered a spin-up during the event that decreased the rotational period from 9.8±0.1 down to 8.8±0.1 hours, which is compatible with the more accurate value estimated from the light-curve.

Closest approach of asteroid drawn to scale.

=== Orbital shift ===
The close approach to Earth reduced the orbital period of Duende from 368 days to 317 days. Its aphelion was reduced from 1.110 to 0.9917 AU, leaving it almost entirely inside Earth's orbit and perturbing it from the Apollo class to the Aten class of near-Earth asteroids.

Its next close approach to Earth will be on 15 February 2046, when it will pass about 0.0148 AU (2,210,000 km; 1,380,000 mi) from Earth. Based on 7 radar observations, the next close approach to Earth similar to the 2013 passage will be on 16 February 2123, when Duende will pass no closer than 0.0002 AU (30,000 km; 19,000 mi) from the center of Earth. For the 2123 passage, the nominal pass will be 0.003 AU (450,000 km; 280,000 mi) from the center of the Moon and then 0.005 AU (750,000 km; 460,000 mi) from the center of Earth.

| Parameter | Epoch | Aphelion (Q) | Perihelion (q) | Semi-major axis (a) | Eccentricity (e) | Period (p) | Inclination (i) | Longitude ascending node (Ω) | Mean anomaly (M) | Argument of perihelion (ω) |
| Units | | AU | | | | (days) | (°) | | | |
|---|---|---|---|---|---|---|---|---|---|---|
| Pre-flyby | 30 Sep 2012 | 1.110 | 0.8935 | 1.001 | 0.1081 | 366.2 | 10.33° | 147.2° | 299.9° | 271.0° |
| Post-flyby | 18 Apr 2013 | 0.9917 | 0.8289 | 0.9103 | 0.0894 | 317.2 | 11.60° | 146.9° | 231.0° | 195.5° |

== Risks ==
Two-body simulation of the Sun and Duende during the 2013 Earth approach, N-body perturbations are not considered.

Risk assessments calculated before the 2013 passage were based on a diameter of 45 meters and a mass of 130,000 tonnes. It was estimated that, if it were ever to impact Earth, it would enter the atmosphere at a speed of 12.7 km/s, would have a kinetic energy equivalent to 2.4 megatons of TNT, and would produce an air burst with the equivalent of 2.1 megatons of TNT at an altitude of roughly 10.1 kilometers (33,000 ft). The Tunguska event has been estimated at 3–20 megatons. Asteroids of approximately 50 meters in diameter are expected to impact Earth once every 1,200 years or so. Asteroids larger than 35 meters across can pose a threat to a town or city, and the Chelyabinsk meteor which serendipitously occurred on the day of the 2013 passage was due to a 17-meter asteroid. As a result of radar observations, it is now known that Duende is only about 30 meters in diameter.

- The uncertainty region of Duende during planetary encounters is now well determined through 2123.
- Duende was therefore removed from the Sentry Risk Table on 16 February 2013.
- It is estimated that there are more than a million near-Earth asteroids smaller than 100 meters.

Airburst estimates for a stony asteroid with a diameter ranging from 30 to 85 meters
| Diameter | Kinetic energy at atmospheric entry | Airburst energy | Airburst altitude | Average frequency |
|---|---|---|---|---|
| 30 m (98 ft) | 708 kt | 530 kt | 16.1 km (53,000 ft) | 185 years |
| 50 m (160 ft) | 3.3 Mt | 2.9 Mt | 8.5 km (28,000 ft) | 764 years |
| 70 m (230 ft) | 9 Mt | 8.5 Mt | 3.4 km (11,000 ft) | 1900 years |
| 85 m (279 ft) | 16.1 Mt | 15.6 Mt | 0.435 km (1,430 ft) | 3300 years |

The table above uses Sentry's stony asteroid density of 2600 kg/m^{3}, Sentry's atmospheric entry velocity (V_{impact}) of 12.7 km/s, and an angle of 45 degrees.

For kinetic energy at atmospheric entry, 3.3 Mt is equivalent to DF-4, 9 Mt is equivalent to Ivy Mike and 15.6 Mt is equivalent to Castle Bravo. For air burst energy, 530 kt is equivalent to W88 and 2.9 Mt is equivalent to R-12 Dvina.

== Naming ==
This minor planet was named after the duende, fairy- or goblin-like mythological creatures from Iberian, Latin American and Filipino folklore. The approved naming citation was published by the Minor Planet Center on 17 November 2013 (M.P.C. 85916).

== See also ==
- 2010 GA6
- 2011 MD
- (29075) 1950 DA
- 99942 Apophis
- 2008 TC3
- Don Quijote (spacecraft)

== Notes ==
| Preceded by 2011 XC2 | Large NEO Earth close approach (inside the orbit of the Moon); 15 February 2013 | Succeeded by (153814) 2001 WN5 |
