= 2010 WC9 =

Near-Earth asteroid first observed in 2010

2010 WC_{9}
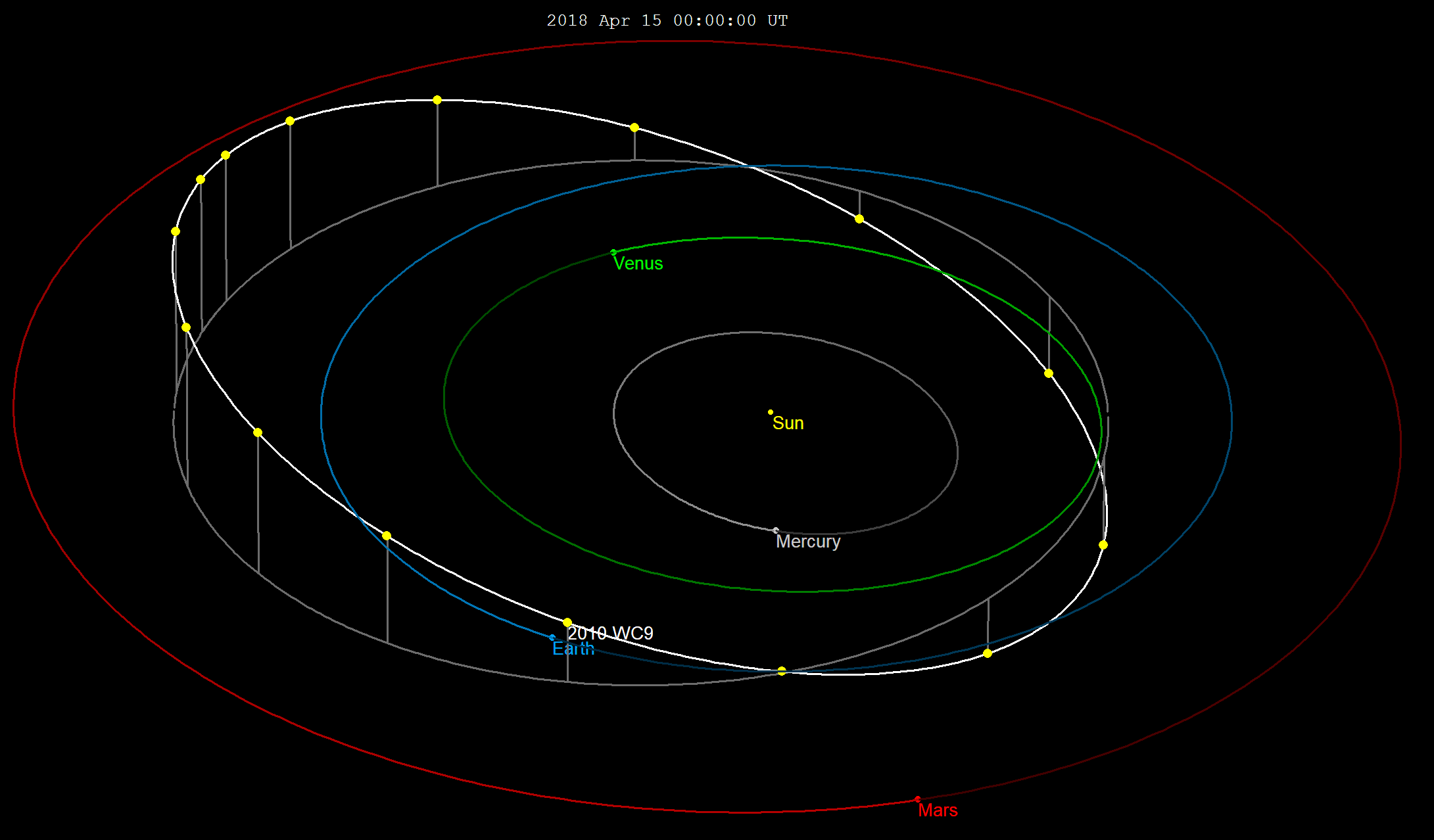
- Orbit of 2010 WC_{9} with positions before 2018 flyby

Discovery
- Discovered by: Catalina Sky Srvy.
- Discovery site: Catalina Stn. (first observed only)
- Discovery date: 30 November 2010

Designations
- Alternative designations: ZJ99C60
- Minor planet category: NEO; Apollo

Orbital characteristics
- Epoch 21 November 2025 (JD 2461000.5)
- Uncertainty parameter 0
- Observation arc: 7.46 yr (2,723 d)
- Aphelion: 1.3727 AU
- Perihelion: 0.7652 AU
- Semi-major axis: 1.0689 AU
- Eccentricity: 0.2841
- Orbital period (sidereal): 1.11 yr (404 d)
- Mean anomaly: 225.55°
- Mean motion: 0° 53^{m} 30.48^{s} / day
- Inclination: 17.681°
- Longitude of ascending node: 54.598°
- Argument of perihelion: 275.96°
- Earth MOID: 0.00000867 AU (0.00338 LD)
- Venus MOID: 0.14214 AU (21,264,000 km)

Physical characteristics
- Mean diameter: 60–130 m; 60 m (est. at 0.20); 130 m (est. at 0.04)
- Synodic rotation period: 0.18469 hours
- Absolute magnitude (H): 23.66

2010 WC_{9} is a sub-kilometer near-Earth asteroid of the Apollo group, approximately 100 meters (330 feet) in diameter. First observed for eleven days by the Catalina Sky Survey in 2010, the asteroid was recovered in May 2018 during its sub-lunar close encounter with Earth.

== First observation and recovery ==
2010 WC_{9} was first observed by astronomers with the Catalina Sky Survey on 30 November 2010 with a 1-day observation arc and was observed through 10 December 2010. By 10 December 2010, the asteroid was more than 24 million kilometers from Earth at apparent magnitude 21.8 and was becoming too faint to be practical to track.

The preliminary 10-day observation arc generated a line of variation roughly 15 million km long for May 2018 that did not intersect Earth's orbit and thus was not a 2018 impact threat. The 10-day observation arc showed the asteroid would pass about 0.026 AU (3,900,000 km; 2,400,000 mi) from Earth around late 14 May 2018. The asteroid was recovered on 8 May 2018 when it was 8 million kilometers from Earth and given the temporary NEOCP designation ZJ99C60. It was removed from the Sentry Risk Table on 10 May 2018 and is not an impact threat for the next 100 years or more. The asteroid now has a secure 7-year observation arc.

== Orbit and classification ==
2010 WC_{9} is an Apollo asteroid, the largest dynamical group of near-Earth objects with nearly 10,000 known members. It orbits the Sun at a distance of 0.77–1.37 AU once every 13 months (404 days; semi-major axis of 1.07 AU). Its orbit has an eccentricity of 0.28 and an inclination of 18° with respect to the ecliptic.

Using an epoch of 21 November 2025, the object had a minimum orbital intersection distance with Earth of 1,300 km (0.00000867 AU), or 0.00338 lunar distances (LD).

== 2018 approach ==
On 15 May 2018, 22:05 UT, the asteroid approached Earth at just over 0.5 LD, the closest approach of this asteroid in nearly 300 years. It was expected to reach apparent magnitude +11 at closest approach, bright enough to be seen in a small telescope if you have a custom ephemeris for your location. At closest approach, it was best seen from the Southern hemisphere such as South Africa and southern South America. The asteroid passed Earth going 12.81 km/s (28,700 mph).

This was the third closest approach ever observed by an asteroid with absolute magnitude (H) brighter than 24.

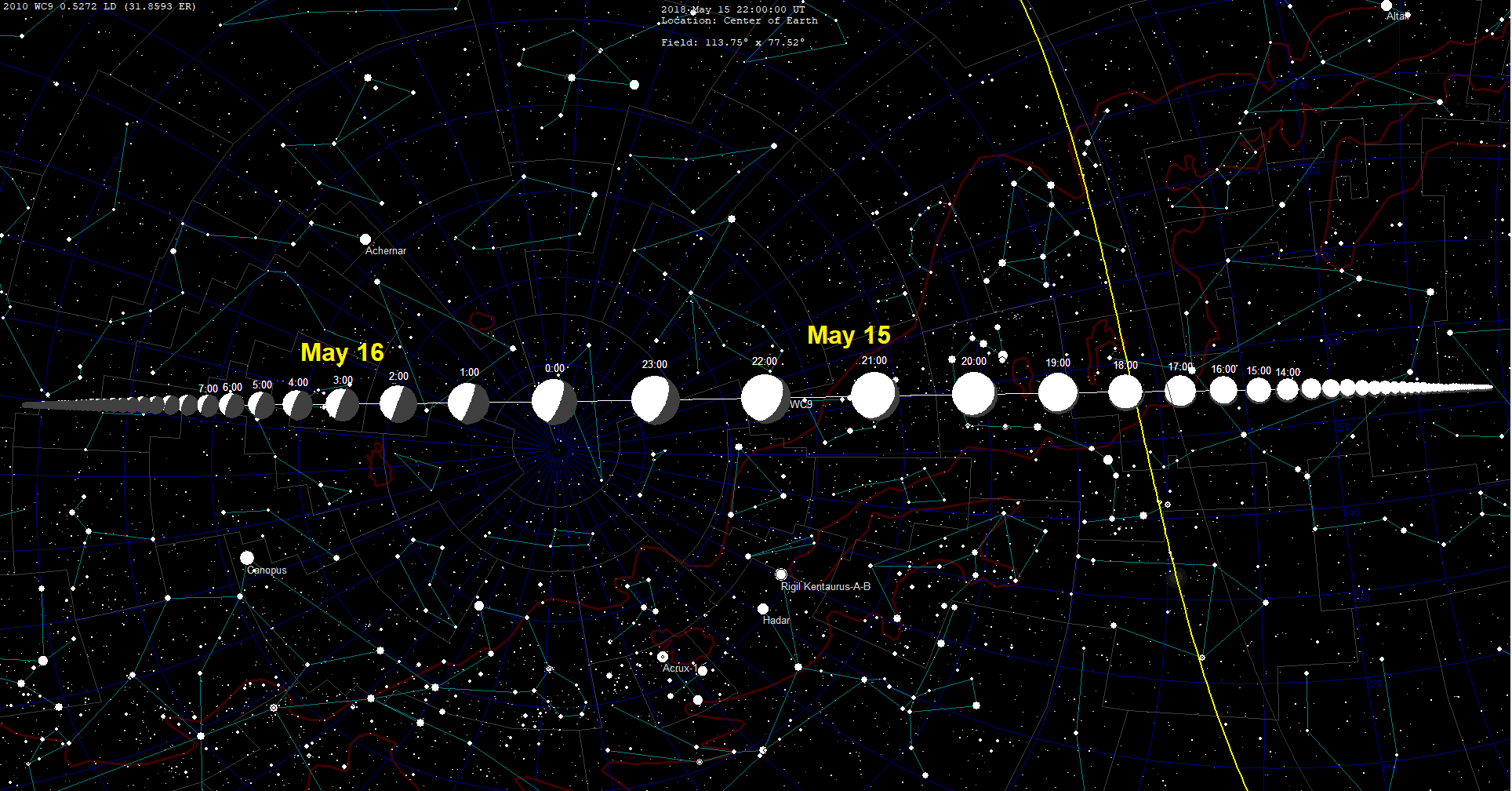
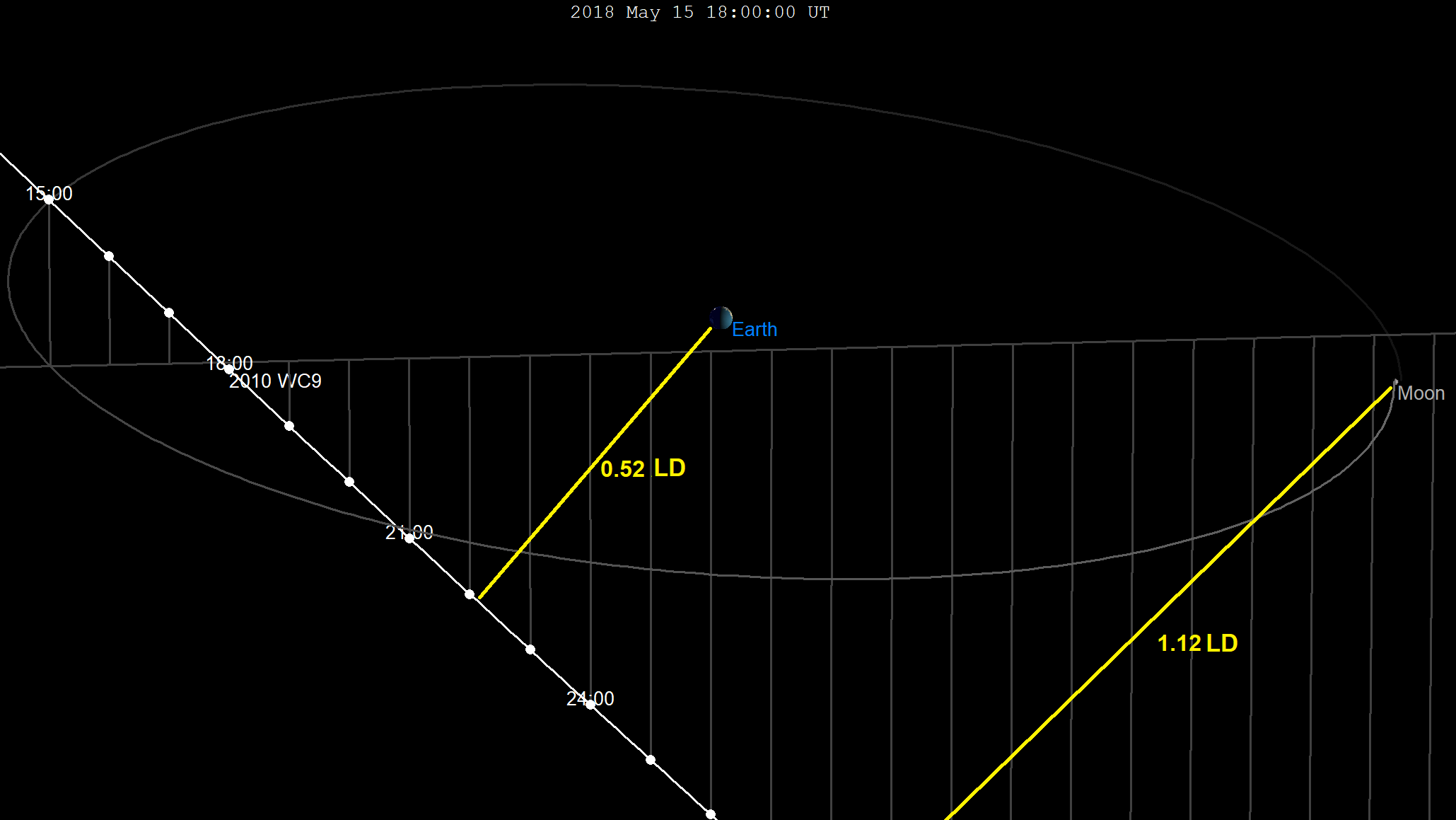
Flyby in 2018: geocentric trajectory in the sky (top) and flyby from north to south, shown with hourly motion (bottom)
Animation of 2010 WC9's orbit

Around the Sun

Around the Earth

2010 WC9 · Sun · Earth · Moon
History of closest approaches of large near-Earth objects since 1914
(less than H 24 and 1 LD)^{(A)}

NEO	Date	Approach distance in lunar distances			Abs. mag (H)	Diameter ^{(C)} (m)	Ref ^{(D)}
NEO	Date	Nominal^{(B)}	Minimum	Maximum	Abs. mag (H)	Diameter ^{(C)} (m)	Ref ^{(D)}
(152680) 1998 KJ9	1914-12-31	0.606	0.604	0.608	19.4	279–900	data
(458732) 2011 MD5	1918-09-17	0.911	0.909	0.913	17.9	556–1795	data
(163132) 2002 CU11	1925-08-30	0.903	0.901	0.905	18.5	443–477	data
2010 VB1	1936-01-06	0.553	0.553	0.553	23.2	48–156	data
2002 JE9	1971-04-11	0.616	0.587	0.651	21.2	122–393	data
2013 UG1	1976-10-17	0.854	0.853	0.855	22.3	73–237	data
2012 TY52	1982-11-04	0.818	0.813	0.822	21.4	111–358	data
2012 UE34	1991-04-08	0.847	0.676	1.027	23.3	46–149	data
2017 VW13	2001-11-08	0.373	0.316	3.236	20.7	153–494	data
2002 MN	2002-06-14	0.312	0.312	0.312	23.6	40–130	data
(308635) 2005 YU55	2011-11-08	0.845	0.845	0.845	21.9	320–400	data
2011 XC2	2011-12-03	0.904	0.901	0.907	23.2	48–156	data
2018 AH	2018-01-02	0.773	0.772	0.773	22.5	67–216	data
2018 GE3	2018-04-15	0.502	0.501	0.503	23.7	35–135	data
2010 WC9	2018-05-15	0.528	0.528	0.528	23.5	42–136	data
(153814) 2001 WN5	2028-06-26	0.647	0.647	0.647	18.2	921–943	data
99942 Apophis	2029-04-13	0.0989	0.0989	0.0989	19.7	310–340	data
2012 UE_{34}	2041-04-08	0.283	0.274	0.354	23.3	46–149	data
2015 XJ351	2047-06-06	0.789	0.251	38.135	22.4	70–226	data
2007 TV18	2058-09-22	0.918	0.917	0.919	23.8	37–119	data
2005 WY55	2065-05-28	0.865	0.856	0.874	20.7	153–494	data
(308635) 2005 YU55	2075-11-08	0.592	0.499	0.752	21.9	320–400	data
(456938) 2007 YV56	2101-01-02	0.621	0.615	0.628	21.0	133–431	data
2007 UW1	2129-10-19	0.239	0.155	0.381	22.7	61–197	data
101955 Bennu	2135-09-25	0.531	0.507	0.555	20.19	472–512	data
(153201) 2000 WO107	2140-12-01	0.634	0.631	0.637	19.3	427–593	data
2009 DO111	2146-03-23	0.896	0.744	1.288	22.8	58–188	data
(85640) 1998 OX4	2148-01-22	0.771	0.770	0.771	21.1	127–411	data
2011 LT17	2156-12-16	0.998	0.955	1.215	21.6	101–327	data
^{(A)} This list includes near-Earth approaches of less than 1 lunar distances (LD) of objects with H brighter than 24.^{(B)} Nominal geocentric distance from the center of Earth to the center of the object (Earth has a radius of approximately 6,400 km).^{(C)} Diameter: estimated, theoretical mean-diameter based on H and albedo range between 0.05 and 0.25.^{(D)} Reference: data source from the JPL SBDB, with AU converted into LD (1 AU≈390 LD)^{(E)} Color codes: unobserved at close approach observed during close approach upcoming approaches Note: All close approaches between 1900 and 2200 are listed (with H<24 at less than 1 LD). Objects not observed during the approach, and simply estimated to have approached on this date, are colored grey. Generically estimated asteroid diameters are given in italics.

== Physical characteristics ==
=== Diameter ===
As the asteroid has not been directly resolved by telescope, its diameter can only be estimated based on the distance and brightness. Based on a generic magnitude-to-diameter conversion, it is estimated to measure between 60 and 130 meters in diameter, for an absolute magnitude of 23.5, and an assumed albedo of 0.04–0.20.

== Numbering and naming ==
As of 2018, this minor planet has neither been numbered nor named by the Minor Planet Center.

== See also ==
- List of asteroid close approaches to Earth in 2018
