= 2018 GE3 =

Large eccentric near-Earth asteroid

2018 GE_{3}
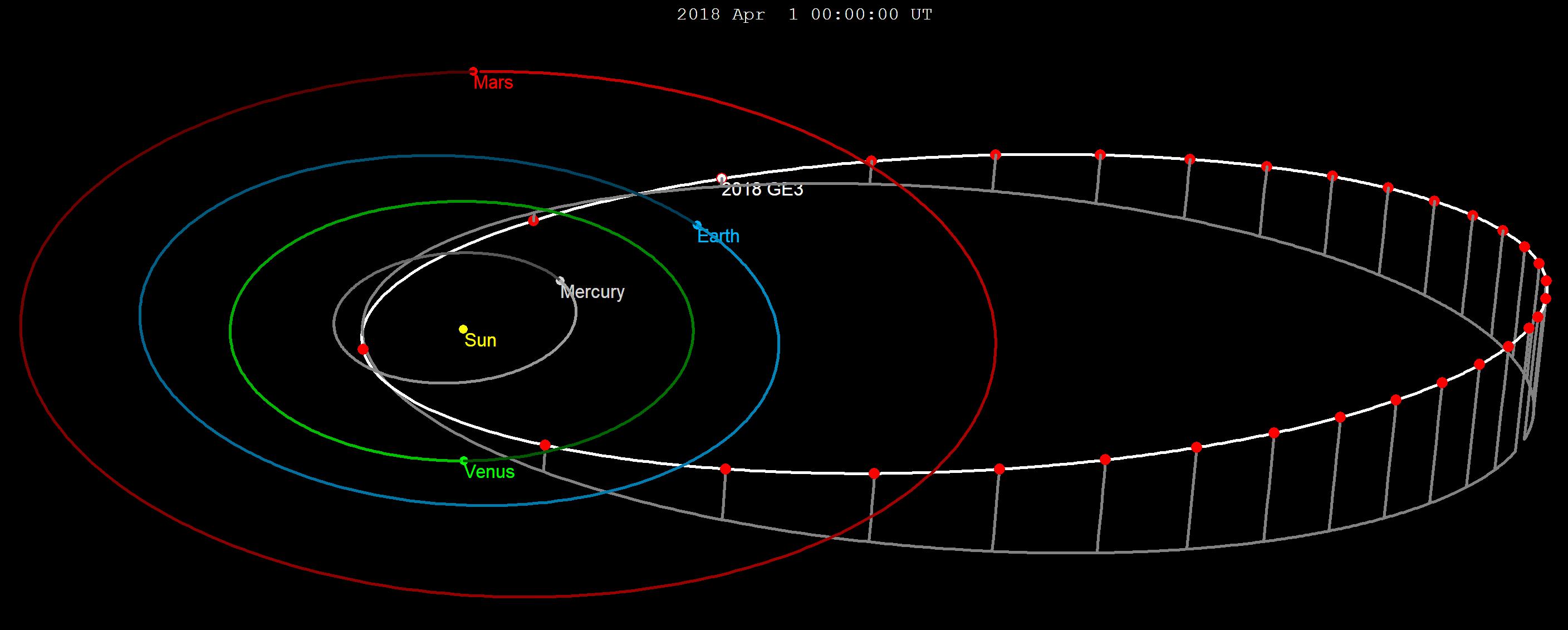
- The orbit of 2018 GE_{3} with 30-day markers

Discovery
- Discovered by: Catalina Sky Srvy.
- Discovery site: Catalina Stn.
- Discovery date: 14 April 2018 (first observed only)

Designations
- Minor planet category: NEO · Apollo

Orbital characteristics
- Epoch 23 March 2018 (JD 2458200.5)
- Uncertainty parameter 7
- Observation arc: 4 days
- Aphelion: 3.3782 AU
- Perihelion: 0.3179 AU
- Semi-major axis: 1.8481 AU
- Eccentricity: 0.8280
- Orbital period (sidereal): 2.51 yr (918 d)
- Mean anomaly: 333.94°
- Mean motion: 0° 23^{m} 32.28^{s} / day
- Inclination: 8.7368°
- Longitude of ascending node: 25.412°
- Argument of perihelion: 300.17°
- Earth MOID: 0.0010 AU (0.3896 LD)
- Mercury MOID: 0.0101 AU
- Venus MOID: 0.0556 AU
- Mars MOID: 0.0527 AU

Physical characteristics
- Mean diameter: 48–110 m 48 m (est. at 0.24); 100 m (est. at 0.05)
- Absolute magnitude (H): 23.813

2018 GE_{3} is a sub-kilometer asteroid on a highly eccentric orbit, classified as a near-Earth object of the Apollo group, approximately 48–110 meters (160–360 feet) in diameter. It was first observed on 14 April 2018, by astronomers with the Catalina Sky Survey one day prior to its sub-lunar close encounter with Earth at 0.5 lunar distance. It is one of the largest known asteroids (possibly the largest) in observational history to ever pass that close to Earth (also see list).

== Orbit and classification ==
2018 GE_{3} is a member of the near-Earth population of asteroids known as Apollos. Apollo asteroids cross the orbit of Earth and are the largest group of near-Earth objects with nearly 10 thousand known members. Based on an observation arc of 4 days, it orbits the Sun at a distance of 0.3–3.4 AU once every 2 years and 6 months (918 days; semi-major axis of 1.85 AU). Its orbit has an unusually high eccentricity of 0.83 and an inclination of 9° with respect to the ecliptic. It is also a Mercury-, Venus- and Mars-crosser, reaching its furthest point from the Sun in the outer asteroid belt. The body's observation arc begins at Steward Observatory's Catalina Station with its first observation in April 2018.

=== Close encounters ===
In observational history, and other than possibly 2002 MN and 2017 VW13, this asteroid is the largest known object to ever pass that close to Earth, as well as the Moon (also see History of closest approaches of large near-Earth objects). (Note: 2002 MN has a brighter absolute magnitude than this asteroid (23.6 vs. 23.8) and may therefore be larger. Note that the term "observational history" excludes objects such as 2017 VW13 not yet discovered at the time of close approach. Furthermore, 2017 VW_{13}'s orbit is uncertain enough that it may not have passed closer than 2018 GE_{3} at all.) 99942 Apophis will break both of these records when it approaches only 0.098 LD (0.000252 AU) from Earth on 13 April 2029.

==== 2018 flyby ====
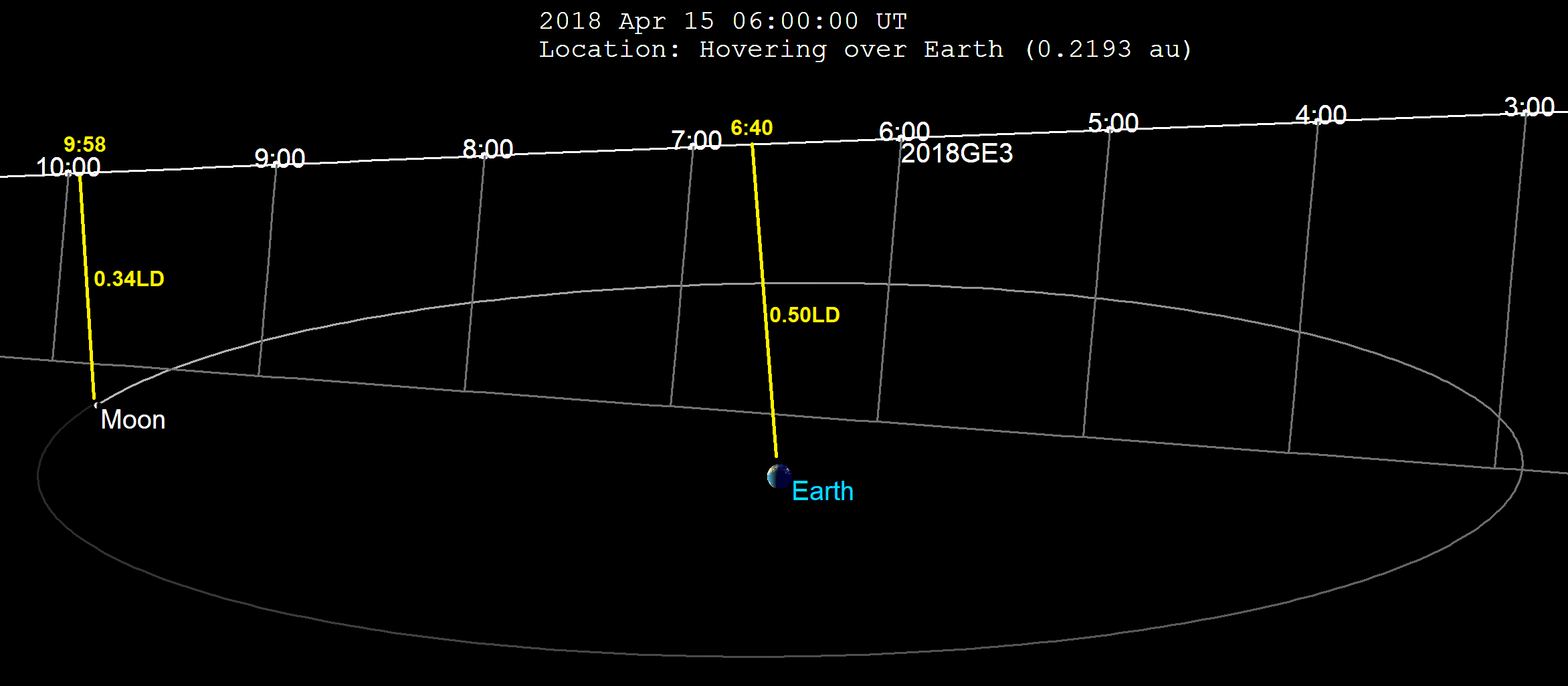
Trajectory past the Earth and Moon

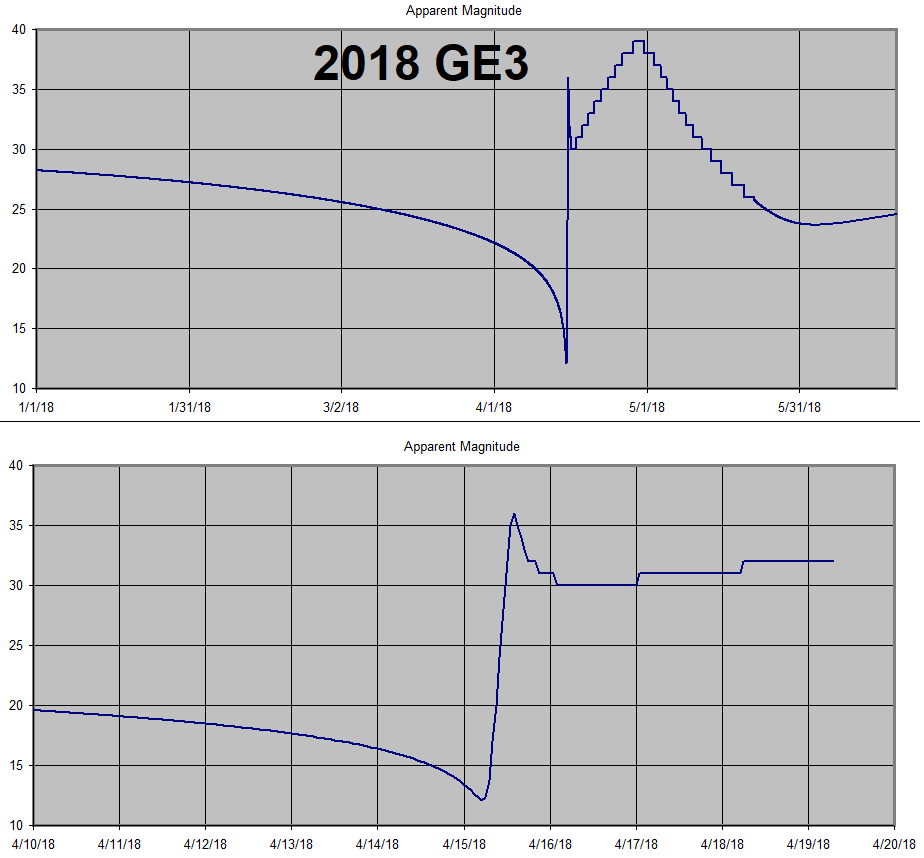
Magnitude estimates

2018 GE_{3} was first observed on 14 April 2018, at 09:23 UT by astronomers at Steward Observatory's Catalina Station, Arizona, the day prior to its close encounter with Earth.

It had been more than 120 degrees from the Sun since March 2018, but was simply too far and too faint to be detected by automated surveys. Despite coming from directly away from the Sun, it was not discovered until 14 April 2018, only one day prior to its closest approach. If the most advanced survey telescopes had been looking at its location, it could have been discovered as early as 30 March. On 15 April 2018, at 06:41 UT, this object passed Earth at a nominal distance of 0.50 LD (0.001289 AU) which corresponds to a distance of 193,000 kilometres (120,000 miles), at a speed of 29.5 km/s (66,000 mph). The object also approached the Moon at an even closer distance of 0.34 LD (0.00087 AU) a few hours later, at 09:59 UT.

It was the 32nd known asteroid to flyby Earth within 1 lunar distance (LD) since the start of 2018 and 16th closest, although it was the largest known asteroid to pass within half a lunar distance. After closest approach its apparent magnitude dropped from 12 to 35 in less than 12 hours, heading towards the Sun. Coming from the opposite direction, it would have been impossible to observe before its approach. A preliminary analysis of the orbit of 2018 GE_{3} shows that this is the closest this particular asteroid has come to Earth since at least 1930.

Animation of 2018 GE3's orbit

Around the Sun

Around the Earth

2018 GE3 · Sun · Earth · Moon

==== Historical close encounters ====
History of closest approaches of large near-Earth objects since 1914
(less than H 24 and 1 LD)^{(A)}

NEO	Date	Approach distance in lunar distances			Abs. mag (H)	Diameter ^{(C)} (m)	Ref ^{(D)}
NEO	Date	Nominal^{(B)}	Minimum	Maximum	Abs. mag (H)	Diameter ^{(C)} (m)	Ref ^{(D)}
(152680) 1998 KJ9	1914-12-31	0.606	0.604	0.608	19.4	279–900	data
(458732) 2011 MD5	1918-09-17	0.911	0.909	0.913	17.9	556–1795	data
(163132) 2002 CU11	1925-08-30	0.903	0.901	0.905	18.5	443–477	data
2010 VB1	1936-01-06	0.553	0.553	0.553	23.2	48–156	data
2002 JE9	1971-04-11	0.616	0.587	0.651	21.2	122–393	data
2013 UG1	1976-10-17	0.854	0.853	0.855	22.3	73–237	data
2012 TY52	1982-11-04	0.818	0.813	0.822	21.4	111–358	data
2012 UE34	1991-04-08	0.847	0.676	1.027	23.3	46–149	data
2017 VW13	2001-11-08	0.373	0.316	3.236	20.7	153–494	data
2002 MN	2002-06-14	0.312	0.312	0.312	23.6	40–130	data
(308635) 2005 YU55	2011-11-08	0.845	0.845	0.845	21.9	320–400	data
2011 XC2	2011-12-03	0.904	0.901	0.907	23.2	48–156	data
2018 AH	2018-01-02	0.773	0.772	0.773	22.5	67–216	data
2018 GE3	2018-04-15	0.502	0.501	0.503	23.7	35–135	data
2010 WC9	2018-05-15	0.528	0.528	0.528	23.5	42–136	data
(153814) 2001 WN5	2028-06-26	0.647	0.647	0.647	18.2	921–943	data
99942 Apophis	2029-04-13	0.0989	0.0989	0.0989	19.7	310–340	data
2012 UE_{34}	2041-04-08	0.283	0.274	0.354	23.3	46–149	data
2015 XJ351	2047-06-06	0.789	0.251	38.135	22.4	70–226	data
2007 TV18	2058-09-22	0.918	0.917	0.919	23.8	37–119	data
2005 WY55	2065-05-28	0.865	0.856	0.874	20.7	153–494	data
(308635) 2005 YU55	2075-11-08	0.592	0.499	0.752	21.9	320–400	data
(456938) 2007 YV56	2101-01-02	0.621	0.615	0.628	21.0	133–431	data
2007 UW1	2129-10-19	0.239	0.155	0.381	22.7	61–197	data
101955 Bennu	2135-09-25	0.531	0.507	0.555	20.19	472–512	data
(153201) 2000 WO107	2140-12-01	0.634	0.631	0.637	19.3	427–593	data
2009 DO111	2146-03-23	0.896	0.744	1.288	22.8	58–188	data
(85640) 1998 OX4	2148-01-22	0.771	0.770	0.771	21.1	127–411	data
2011 LT17	2156-12-16	0.998	0.955	1.215	21.6	101–327	data
^{(A)} This list includes near-Earth approaches of less than 1 lunar distances (LD) of objects with H brighter than 24.^{(B)} Nominal geocentric distance from the center of Earth to the center of the object (Earth has a radius of approximately 6,400 km).^{(C)} Diameter: estimated, theoretical mean-diameter based on H and albedo range between 0.05 and 0.25.^{(D)} Reference: data source from the JPL SBDB, with AU converted into LD (1 AU≈390 LD)^{(E)} Color codes: unobserved at close approach observed during close approach upcoming approaches Note: All close approaches between 1900 and 2200 are listed (with H<24 at less than 1 LD). Objects not observed during the approach, and simply estimated to have approached on this date, are colored grey. Generically estimated asteroid diameters are given in italics.

Asteroid 2002 MN passed closer to Earth than 2018 GE_{3} in 2002, and had a brighter absolute magnitude (H) of 23.6, and could be either larger or smaller than 2018 GE_{3}, depending on their albedos and thus exact sizes. 2017 VW13 (H=20.7) may have also passed closer in 2001, although the distance of its approach is very uncertain and it was not discovered until 2017.

== Physical characteristics ==
=== Diameter and albedo ===
The diameter can only be estimated based on the brightness and distance. The albedo is currently unknown. Based on a generic magnitude-to-diameter conversion, 2018 GE_{3} measures between 48–100 meters (157–328 feet) in diameter, for an absolute magnitude of 23.8, and an assumed albedo between 0.05 and 0.24, which represent typical values for carbonaceous and stony asteroids, respectively.

This asteroid is about three to six times the diameter of the meteor that exploded in the skies above Chelyabinsk, Russia in February 2013, which damaged over 7,200 buildings and injured 1,500 people, mostly from flying glass. If an asteroid of this size were to enter Earth's atmosphere, a good portion of it would likely disintegrate due to friction with the air. The remnants could survive entry however and impact the surface, thus causing regional damage dependent on various factors such as composition, speed, entry angle, and location of impact.

=== Rotation period ===
As of 2018, no rotational lightcurve of 2018 GE_{3} has been obtained from photometric observations. The body's rotation period, pole and shape remain unknown.

== Numbering and naming ==
This minor planet has neither been numbered nor named.

== See also ==
- List of asteroid close approaches to Earth
- List of asteroid close approaches to Earth in 2018
- 2018 AH, a slightly larger asteroid that also passed unusually close to Earth in 2018.
