= 2002 MN =

Near-Earth asteroid

Discovery
- Discovered by: MIT Lincoln Laboratory
- Discovery date: 17 June 2002

Designations
- Minor planet category: Apollo; NEO

Orbital characteristics
- Epoch 21 November 2025 (JD 2461000.5)
- Uncertainty parameter 0
- Observation arc: 22.04 yr
- Aphelion: 2.7236 AU (407.44 Gm)
- Perihelion: 0.90900 AU (135.984 Gm)
- Semi-major axis: 1.8163 AU (271.71 Gm)
- Eccentricity: 0.49953
- Orbital period (sidereal): 2.4478 yr (894.08 d)
- Mean anomaly: 224.060°
- Mean motion: 0.40265° / day
- Inclination: 1.0471°
- Longitude of ascending node: 85.291°
- Argument of perihelion: 131.599°
- Earth MOID: 0.000353729 AU (52,917.1 km)
- Jupiter MOID: 2.24701 AU (336.148 Gm)

Physical characteristics
- Dimensions: ~73 meters (240 ft) (assumed) (Note: Diameter estimate based on an assumed albedo of 0.15.)
- Mass: 5.4×10^{8} kg
- Absolute magnitude (H): 23.7

2002 MN is a 73-meter Apollo near-Earth asteroid that on 14 June 2002 passed Earth at a distance of 0.0008 AU (120,000 km; 74,000 mi), about one third the distance to the Moon (0.3 LD). The close approach was second only to the Earth approach by the 10-meter asteroid 1994 XM1. 2002 MN was discovered on 17 June 2002, three days after closest approach. Its mass and relative velocity were in the same general range as the object ascribed to the Tunguska event of 1908, which leveled over 2,100 km^{2} (800 mi^{2}) of trees in Siberia.

2002 MN was estimated to have a 1 in 360,000 chance of Earth impact sometime after 2070, but further observations in July 2024 ruled this out, and the object was removed from the risk list.

History of closest approaches of large near-Earth objects since 1914
(less than H 24 and 1 LD)^{(A)}

NEO	Date	Approach distance in lunar distances			Abs. mag (H)	Diameter ^{(C)} (m)	Ref ^{(D)}
NEO	Date	Nominal^{(B)}	Minimum	Maximum	Abs. mag (H)	Diameter ^{(C)} (m)	Ref ^{(D)}
(152680) 1998 KJ9	1914-12-31	0.606	0.604	0.608	19.4	279–900	data
(458732) 2011 MD5	1918-09-17	0.911	0.909	0.913	17.9	556–1795	data
(163132) 2002 CU11	1925-08-30	0.903	0.901	0.905	18.5	443–477	data
2010 VB1	1936-01-06	0.553	0.553	0.553	23.2	48–156	data
2002 JE9	1971-04-11	0.616	0.587	0.651	21.2	122–393	data
2013 UG1	1976-10-17	0.854	0.853	0.855	22.3	73–237	data
2012 TY52	1982-11-04	0.818	0.813	0.822	21.4	111–358	data
2012 UE34	1991-04-08	0.847	0.676	1.027	23.3	46–149	data
2017 VW13	2001-11-08	0.373	0.316	3.236	20.7	153–494	data
2002 MN	2002-06-14	0.312	0.312	0.312	23.6	40–130	data
(308635) 2005 YU55	2011-11-08	0.845	0.845	0.845	21.9	320–400	data
2011 XC2	2011-12-03	0.904	0.901	0.907	23.2	48–156	data
2018 AH	2018-01-02	0.773	0.772	0.773	22.5	67–216	data
2018 GE3	2018-04-15	0.502	0.501	0.503	23.7	35–135	data
2010 WC9	2018-05-15	0.528	0.528	0.528	23.5	42–136	data
(153814) 2001 WN5	2028-06-26	0.647	0.647	0.647	18.2	921–943	data
99942 Apophis	2029-04-13	0.0989	0.0989	0.0989	19.7	310–340	data
2012 UE_{34}	2041-04-08	0.283	0.274	0.354	23.3	46–149	data
2015 XJ351	2047-06-06	0.789	0.251	38.135	22.4	70–226	data
2007 TV18	2058-09-22	0.918	0.917	0.919	23.8	37–119	data
2005 WY55	2065-05-28	0.865	0.856	0.874	20.7	153–494	data
(308635) 2005 YU55	2075-11-08	0.592	0.499	0.752	21.9	320–400	data
(456938) 2007 YV56	2101-01-02	0.621	0.615	0.628	21.0	133–431	data
2007 UW1	2129-10-19	0.239	0.155	0.381	22.7	61–197	data
101955 Bennu	2135-09-25	0.531	0.507	0.555	20.19	472–512	data
(153201) 2000 WO107	2140-12-01	0.634	0.631	0.637	19.3	427–593	data
2009 DO111	2146-03-23	0.896	0.744	1.288	22.8	58–188	data
(85640) 1998 OX4	2148-01-22	0.771	0.770	0.771	21.1	127–411	data
2011 LT17	2156-12-16	0.998	0.955	1.215	21.6	101–327	data
^{(A)} This list includes near-Earth approaches of less than 1 lunar distances (LD) of objects with H brighter than 24.^{(B)} Nominal geocentric distance from the center of Earth to the center of the object (Earth has a radius of approximately 6,400 km).^{(C)} Diameter: estimated, theoretical mean-diameter based on H and albedo range between 0.05 and 0.25.^{(D)} Reference: data source from the JPL SBDB, with AU converted into LD (1 AU≈390 LD)^{(E)} Color codes: unobserved at close approach observed during close approach upcoming approaches Note: All close approaches between 1900 and 2200 are listed (with H<24 at less than 1 LD). Objects not observed during the approach, and simply estimated to have approached on this date, are colored grey. Generically estimated asteroid diameters are given in italics.

== Notes ==
Preceded by 2002 JE9	Large NEO Earth close approach (inside the orbit of the Moon); 14 June 2002	Succeeded by (308635) 2005 YU55
