= 2011 XC2 =

Near-Earth asteroid

2011 XC_{2}
Discovery
- Discovered by: LINEAR (704)
- Discovery date: 8 December 2011

Designations
- Minor planet category: Apollo NEO

Orbital characteristics
- Epoch 13 January 2016 (JD 2457400.5)
- Uncertainty parameter 7
- Observation arc: 22 days
- Aphelion: 3.1579 AU (472.42 Gm) (Q)
- Perihelion: 0.83844 AU (125.429 Gm) (q)
- Semi-major axis: 1.9982 AU (298.93 Gm) (a)
- Eccentricity: 0.58040 (e)
- Orbital period (sidereal): 2.82 yr (1031.7 d)
- Mean anomaly: 176.76° (M)
- Mean motion: 0° 20^{m} 56.184^{s} /day (n)
- Inclination: 28.768° (i)
- Longitude of ascending node: 70.686° (Ω)
- Argument of perihelion: 306.58° (ω)
- Earth MOID: 0.00132534 AU (198,268 km)
- Jupiter MOID: 2.67756 AU (400.557 Gm)

Physical characteristics
- Dimensions: ~85 meters (279 ft); 60–140 meters
- Mass: 8.4×10^{8} kg (assumed)
- Absolute magnitude (H): 23.2

2011 XC_{2} is a near-Earth asteroid roughly 60–140 meters (200–460 ft) in diameter that passed less than 1 lunar distance from Earth on 3 December 2011.

From mid October 2011 until 3 December 2011 15:00 UT the small dim asteroid had an elongation less than 60 degrees from the Sun. (While less than 18 degrees from the Sun any dim asteroid can be lost in astronomical twilight, and many observatories can not see below ~40 degrees from the horizon.) On 3 December 2011 at 15:20 UT the asteroid passed 0.0023 AU (340,000 km; 210,000 mi) from Earth and at 16:20 UT passed 0.0016 AU (240,000 km; 150,000 mi) from the Moon. The asteroid was then discovered on 8 December 2011 by Lincoln Near-Earth Asteroid Research (LINEAR) at an apparent magnitude of 19 using a 1.0-meter (39 in) reflecting telescope. At the time of discovery the asteroid was near opposition to the Sun.

It has an observation arc of 22 days with an uncertainty parameter of 7. Virtual clones of the asteroid that fit the uncertainty region in the known trajectory show a 1 in 455,000 chance that the asteroid will impact Earth on 2 December 2056. With a 2056 Palermo Technical Scale of −4.35, the odds of impact by 2011 XC_{2} in 2056 are about 22387 times less than the background hazard level of Earth impacts which is defined as the average risk posed by objects of the same size or larger over the years until the date of the potential impact. Using the nominal orbit, JPL Horizons shows that the asteroid will be 3.8 AU (570,000,000 km; 350,000,000 mi) from Earth on 2 December 2056.

H < 24 asteroids passing less than 1 LD from Earth
| Asteroid | Date | Nominal approach distance (LD) | Min. distance (LD) | Max. distance (LD) | Absolute magnitude (H) | Size (meters) |
|---|---|---|---|---|---|---|
| (152680) 1998 KJ9 | 1914-12-31 | 0.606 | 0.604 | 0.608 | 19.4 | 279–900 |
| (458732) 2011 MD5 | 1918-09-17 | 0.911 | 0.909 | 0.913 | 17.9 | 556–1795 |
| (163132) 2002 CU11 | 1925-08-30 | 0.903 | 0.901 | 0.905 | 18.5 | 443–477 |
| 2010 VB1 | 1936-01-06 | 0.553 | 0.553 | 0.553 | 23.2 | 48–156 |
| 2002 JE9 | 1971-04-11 | 0.616 | 0.587 | 0.651 | 21.2 | 122–393 |
| 2013 UG1 | 1976-10-17 | 0.854 | 0.853 | 0.855 | 22.3 | 73–237 |
| 2012 TY52 | 1981-11-04 | 0.818 | 0.813 | 0.823 | 21.4 | 111–358 |
| 2012 UE34 | 1991-04-08 | 0.847 | 0.676 | 1.027 | 23.3 | 46–149 |
| 2017 VW13 | 2001-11-08 | 0.454 | 0.318 | 3.436 | 20.7 | 153–494 |
| 2002 MN | 2002-06-14 | 0.312 | 0.312 | 0.312 | 23.6 | 40–130 |
| (308635) 2005 YU55 | 2011-11-08 | 0.845 | 0.845 | 0.845 | 21.9 | 320–400 |
| 2011 XC_{2} | 2011-12-03 | 0.904 | 0.901 | 0.907 | 23.2 | 48–156 |
| 2018 AH | 2018-01-02 | 0.773 | 0.772 | 0.773 | 22.5 | 67–216 |
| 2018 GE3 | 2018-04-15 | 0.502 | 0.501 | 0.503 | 23.7 | 35–135 |
| (153814) 2001 WN5 | 2028-06-26 | 0.647 | 0.647 | 0.647 | 18.2 | 921–943 |
| 99942 Apophis | 2029-04-13 | 0.0981 | 0.0963 | 0.1000 | 19.7 | 310–340 |
| 2012 UE_{34} | 2041-04-08 | 0.283 | 0.274 | 0.354 | 23.3 | 46–149 |
| 2015 XJ351 | 2047-06-06 | 0.789 | 0.251 | 38.135 | 22.4 | 70–226 |
| 2007 TV18 | 2058-09-22 | 0.918 | 0.917 | 0.919 | 23.8 | 37–119 |
| 2005 WY55 | 2065-05-28 | 0.865 | 0.856 | 0.874 | 20.7 | 153–494 |
| (308635) 2005 YU_{55} | 2075-11-08 | 0.592 | 0.499 | 0.752 | 21.9 | 320–400 |
| (456938) 2007 YV56 | 2101-01-02 | 0.621 | 0.615 | 0.628 | 21.0 | 133–431 |
| 2007 UW1 | 2129-10-19 | 0.239 | 0.155 | 0.381 | 22.7 | 61–197 |
| 101955 Bennu | 2135-09-25 | 0.780 | 0.308 | 1.406 | 20.19 | 472–512 |
| (153201) 2000 WO107 | 2140-12-01 | 0.634 | 0.631 | 0.637 | 19.3 | 427–593 |
| 2009 DO111 | 2146-03-23 | 0.896 | 0.744 | 1.288 | 22.8 | 58–188 |
| (85640) 1998 OX4 | 2148-01-22 | 0.771 | 0.770 | 0.771 | 21.1 | 127–411 |
| 2007 UY1 | 2156-02-13 | 0.685 | 0.652 | 6.856 | 22.9 | 56–179 |
| 2011 LT17 | 2156-12-16 | 0.998 | 0.955 | 1.215 | 21.6 | 101–327 |

| Preceded by (308635) 2005 YU55 | Large NEO Earth close approach (inside the orbit of the Moon); 3 December 2011 | Succeeded by 367943 Duende (2012 DA_{14}) |
