= 2012 UE34 =

Sub-kilometer asteroid

2012 UE_{34}
Discovery
- Discovered by: Pan-STARRS 1
- Discovery site: Haleakala Obs.
- Discovery date: 18 October 2012 (first observed only)

Designations
- Minor planet category: NEO; Apollo

Orbital characteristics
- Epoch 27 April 2019 (JD 2458600.5)
- Uncertainty parameter: 0; 1
- Observation arc: 7.06 yr (2,578 d)
- Aphelion: 1.2151 AU
- Perihelion: 0.9956 AU
- Semi-major axis: 1.1053 AU
- Eccentricity: 0.0993
- Orbital period (sidereal): 1.16 yr (424 d)
- Mean anomaly: 31.060°
- Mean motion: 0° 50^{m} 53.16^{s} / day
- Inclination: 9.6584°
- Longitude of ascending node: 198.48°
- Argument of perihelion: 18.425°
- Earth MOID: 0.000919 AU (0.358 LD)

Physical characteristics
- Mean diameter: 66 m (est. at 0.20); 130 m (est. at 0.05)
- Absolute magnitude (H): 23.3

2012 UE_{34} is a sub-kilometer asteroid, classified as a near-Earth object of the Apollo group, approximately 70 meters (230 feet) in diameter. It was first observed on 18 October 2012, by Pan-STARRS at Haleakala Observatory on the island of Maui, Hawaii, in the United States. The object was removed from the Sentry Risk Table on 29 December 2013. On 8 April 2041 it will pass Earth at a nominal distance of 0.0007329 AU (110,000 km; 68,000 mi). Due to its presumed small size, it does not qualify as a potentially hazardous asteroid, despite its low Earth MOID.

== Orbit and classification ==
2012 UE_{34} is an Apollo asteroid, which are Earth-crossers and the largest subgroup in the near-Earth object population. It orbits the Sun at a distance of 0.996–1.22 AU once every 14 months (424 days; semi-major axis of 1.11 AU). Its orbit has an eccentricity of 0.10 and an inclination of 10° with respect to the ecliptic. The body's observation arc begins with its official first observation at Haleakala in October 2012.

=== Close encounters ===
2012 UE_{34} passed about 0.002 AU (300,000 km; 190,000 mi) from Earth on 8 April 1991. On 8 April 2041, the asteroid will pass about 0.0007 AU (100,000 km; 65,000 mi) from Earth. For comparison, the distance to the Moon is about 0.0026 AU (384,400 km).

It has an exceptionally low minimum orbital intersection distance with Earth of 0.000919 AU (137,500 km), which translates into 0.36 lunar distances. Despite this exceptionally low theoretical distance, the asteroid is not listed as a potentially hazardous asteroid, due to its small size, represented by its proxy, an absolute magnitude of 23.3, which is below the defined threshold of 22 magnitude.

H < 24 asteroids passing less than 1 LD from Earth
Asteroid	Date	Nominal approach distance (LD)	Min. distance (LD)	Max. distance (LD)	Absolute magnitude (H)	Size (meters)
(152680) 1998 KJ9	1914-12-31	0.606	0.604	0.608	19.4	279–900
(458732) 2011 MD5	1918-09-17	0.911	0.909	0.913	17.9	556–1795
(163132) 2002 CU11	1925-08-30	0.903	0.901	0.905	18.5	443–477
2010 VB1	1936-01-06	0.553	0.553	0.553	23.2	48–156
2002 JE9	1971-04-11	0.616	0.587	0.651	21.2	122–393
2013 UG1	1976-10-17	0.854	0.853	0.855	22.3	73–237
2012 TY52	1981-11-04	0.818	0.813	0.823	21.4	111–358
2012 UE_{34}	1991-04-08	0.847	0.676	1.027	23.3	46–149
2017 VW13	2001-11-08	0.454	0.318	3.436	20.7	153–494
2002 MN	2002-06-14	0.312	0.312	0.312	23.6	40–130
(308635) 2005 YU55	2011-11-08	0.845	0.845	0.845	21.9	320–400
2011 XC2	2011-12-03	0.904	0.901	0.907	23.2	48–156
2018 AH	2018-01-02	0.773	0.772	0.773	22.5	67–216
2018 GE3	2018-04-15	0.502	0.501	0.503	23.7	35–135
(153814) 2001 WN5	2028-06-26	0.647	0.647	0.647	18.2	921–943
99942 Apophis	2029-04-13	0.0981	0.0963	0.1000	19.7	310–340
2012 UE_{34}	2041-04-08	0.283	0.274	0.354	23.3	46–149
2015 XJ351	2047-06-06	0.789	0.251	38.135	22.4	70–226
2007 TV18	2058-09-22	0.918	0.917	0.919	23.8	37–119
2005 WY55	2065-05-28	0.865	0.856	0.874	20.7	153–494
(308635) 2005 YU_{55}	2075-11-08	0.592	0.499	0.752	21.9	320–400
(456938) 2007 YV56	2101-01-02	0.621	0.615	0.628	21.0	133–431
2007 UW1	2129-10-19	0.239	0.155	0.381	22.7	61–197
101955 Bennu	2135-09-25	0.780	0.308	1.406	20.19	472–512
(153201) 2000 WO107	2140-12-01	0.634	0.631	0.637	19.3	427–593
2009 DO111	2146-03-23	0.896	0.744	1.288	22.8	58–188
(85640) 1998 OX4	2148-01-22	0.771	0.770	0.771	21.1	127–411
2007 UY1	2156-02-13	0.685	0.652	6.856	22.9	56–179
2011 LT17	2156-12-16	0.998	0.955	1.215	21.6	101–327

== Numbering and naming ==
This minor planet has not been numbered by the Minor Planet Center and remains unnamed.

== Physical characteristics ==
Based on a generic magnitude-to-diameter conversion, 2012 UE_{34} measures 66 meters in diameter, for an absolute magnitude of 23.3 and an assumed albedo of 0.20, which is typical for stony S-type asteroids. In the unusual case of being a carbonaceous asteroid with a low albedo of 0.05, 2012 UE_{34} may be as large as 130 meters in diameter.

Preceded by 99942 Apophis	Large NEO Earth close approach (inside the orbit of the Moon); 8 April 2041	Succeeded by 2005 WY55
