= (456938) 2007 YV56 =

Sub-kilometer asteroid on an eccentric orbit

(456938) 2007 YV_{56}
Discovery
- Discovered by: CSS
- Discovery site: Mount Lemmon Obs.
- Discovery date: 31 December 2007

Designations
- Minor planet category: NEO · Apollo · PHA

Orbital characteristics
- Epoch 23 March 2018 (JD 2458200.5)
- Uncertainty parameter 0
- Observation arc: 8.10 yr (2,959 days)
- Aphelion: 2.5556 AU
- Perihelion: 0.5952 AU
- Semi-major axis: 1.5754 AU
- Eccentricity: 0.6222
- Orbital period (sidereal): 1.98 yr (722 days)
- Mean anomaly: 87.984°
- Mean motion: 0° 29^{m} 54.24^{s} / day
- Inclination: 6.2441°
- Longitude of ascending node: 102.42°
- Argument of perihelion: 265.73°
- Earth MOID: 0.0047 AU (1.83 LD)
- Venus MOID: 0.0019 AU
- Mars MOID: 0.0571 AU

Physical characteristics
- Mean diameter: 0.19 km (est. at 0.20); 0.36 km (est. at 0.057)
- Absolute magnitude (H): 21.0

(456938) 2007 YV_{56} is a sub-kilometer asteroid on an eccentric orbit, classified as a near-Earth object and potentially hazardous asteroid of the Apollo group, approximately 190–360 meters (620–1,200 ft) in diameter. It was discovered on 31 December 2007, by astronomers of the Catalina Sky Survey conducted at the Catalina Station in Arizona, United States.

== Orbit and classification ==
2007 YV_{56} is an Apollo asteroid that crosses the orbit of Earth. Apollo's are the largest group of near-Earth objects with nearly 10 thousand known members.

It orbits the Sun at a distance of 0.60–2.55 AU once every 2 years (722 days; semi-major axis of 1.58 AU). Its orbit has a high eccentricity of 0.62 and an inclination of 6° with respect to the ecliptic. This makes it also a Mars-crossing asteroid, as it crosses the orbit of the Red Planet at 1.66 AU, as well as a Venus-crosser due to its aphelion of less than 0.71 AU. The body's observation arc begins at Catalina with its official discovery observation in December 2007.

== Close approaches ==
2007 YV_{56} has a minimum orbital intersection distance (MOID) with Earth of 703,000 km; 437,000 mi (0.0047 AU), which corresponds to 1.83 lunar distances (LD). It has an absolute magnitude of 21.0. This makes it a potentially hazardous asteroid, which are defined as having a MOID of less than 0.05 AU (19 LD) and an absolute magnitude brighter than 22. Besides Earth, it also makes close approaches to Venus, Mars and the Moon.

On 26 December 2007, five days prior to its discovery observation, it passed Earth at a nominal distance of 0.10037 AU (39.06 LD). On 2 January 2101, it is predicted to flyby Earth at 0.00159 AU (0.62 LD) and pass the Moon at a similar distance five hours earlier as well (also see List of asteroid close approaches to Earth § Predicted encounters).

History of closest approaches of large near-Earth objects since 1914
(less than H 24 and 1 LD)^{(A)}

NEO	Date	Approach distance in lunar distances			Abs. mag (H)	Diameter ^{(C)} (m)	Ref ^{(D)}
NEO	Date	Nominal^{(B)}	Minimum	Maximum	Abs. mag (H)	Diameter ^{(C)} (m)	Ref ^{(D)}
(152680) 1998 KJ9	1914-12-31	0.606	0.604	0.608	19.4	279–900	data
(458732) 2011 MD5	1918-09-17	0.911	0.909	0.913	17.9	556–1795	data
(163132) 2002 CU11	1925-08-30	0.903	0.901	0.905	18.5	443–477	data
2010 VB1	1936-01-06	0.553	0.553	0.553	23.2	48–156	data
2002 JE9	1971-04-11	0.616	0.587	0.651	21.2	122–393	data
2013 UG1	1976-10-17	0.854	0.853	0.855	22.3	73–237	data
2012 TY52	1982-11-04	0.818	0.813	0.822	21.4	111–358	data
2012 UE34	1991-04-08	0.847	0.676	1.027	23.3	46–149	data
2017 VW13	2001-11-08	0.373	0.316	3.236	20.7	153–494	data
2002 MN	2002-06-14	0.312	0.312	0.312	23.6	40–130	data
(308635) 2005 YU55	2011-11-08	0.845	0.845	0.845	21.9	320–400	data
2011 XC2	2011-12-03	0.904	0.901	0.907	23.2	48–156	data
2018 AH	2018-01-02	0.773	0.772	0.773	22.5	67–216	data
2018 GE3	2018-04-15	0.502	0.501	0.503	23.7	35–135	data
2010 WC9	2018-05-15	0.528	0.528	0.528	23.5	42–136	data
(153814) 2001 WN5	2028-06-26	0.647	0.647	0.647	18.2	921–943	data
99942 Apophis	2029-04-13	0.0989	0.0989	0.0989	19.7	310–340	data
2012 UE_{34}	2041-04-08	0.283	0.274	0.354	23.3	46–149	data
2015 XJ351	2047-06-06	0.789	0.251	38.135	22.4	70–226	data
2007 TV18	2058-09-22	0.918	0.917	0.919	23.8	37–119	data
2005 WY55	2065-05-28	0.865	0.856	0.874	20.7	153–494	data
(308635) 2005 YU55	2075-11-08	0.592	0.499	0.752	21.9	320–400	data
(456938) 2007 YV56	2101-01-02	0.621	0.615	0.628	21.0	133–431	data
2007 UW1	2129-10-19	0.239	0.155	0.381	22.7	61–197	data
101955 Bennu	2135-09-25	0.531	0.507	0.555	20.19	472–512	data
(153201) 2000 WO107	2140-12-01	0.634	0.631	0.637	19.3	427–593	data
2009 DO111	2146-03-23	0.896	0.744	1.288	22.8	58–188	data
(85640) 1998 OX4	2148-01-22	0.771	0.770	0.771	21.1	127–411	data
2011 LT17	2156-12-16	0.998	0.955	1.215	21.6	101–327	data
^{(A)} This list includes near-Earth approaches of less than 1 lunar distances (LD) of objects with H brighter than 24.^{(B)} Nominal geocentric distance from the center of Earth to the center of the object (Earth has a radius of approximately 6,400 km).^{(C)} Diameter: estimated, theoretical mean-diameter based on H and albedo range between 0.05 and 0.25.^{(D)} Reference: data source from the JPL SBDB, with AU converted into LD (1 AU≈390 LD)^{(E)} Color codes: unobserved at close approach observed during close approach upcoming approaches Note: All close approaches between 1900 and 2200 are listed (with H<24 at less than 1 LD). Objects not observed during the approach, and simply estimated to have approached on this date, are colored grey. Generically estimated asteroid diameters are given in italics.

== Physical characteristics ==
The body's spectral type is unknown. Near-Earth asteroids are often of a stony composition.

=== Diameter and albedo ===
Based on a generic magnitude-to-diameter conversion, 2007 YV_{56} measures 190–360 meters (620–1,180 ft) in diameter, for an absolute magnitude of 21.0, and an assumed albedo of 0.20 and 0.057, which represent typical values for stony and carbonaceous asteroids, respectively.

=== Rotation period ===
As of 2018, no rotational lightcurve of 2007 YV_{56} has been obtained from photometric observations. The body's rotation period, pole and shape remain unknown.

== Numbering and naming ==
This minor planet was numbered by the Minor Planet Center on 22 February 2016 (M.P.C. 98584). As of 2018, it has not been named.

Preceded by 2005 WY55	Large NEO Earth close approach (inside the orbit of the Moon); 2 January 2101	Succeeded by 2007 UW1
