= (308635) 2005 YU55 =

Potentially hazardous near-Earth asteroid

(308635) 2005 YU_{55}
- Goldstone radar images of asteroid 2005 YU_{55} taken 9 November 2011.

Discovery
- Discovered by: R. S. McMillan; Steward Observatory; Kitt Peak (691)
- Discovery date: 28 December 2005

Designations
- Minor planet category: Apollo ; NEO; PHA

Orbital characteristics
- Epoch 13 January 2016 (JD 2457400.5)
- Uncertainty parameter 0
- Observation arc: 2,183 days (5.98 yr)
- Aphelion: 1.65562913 AU (247.678593 Gm) (Q)
- Perihelion: 0.659003712 AU (98.5855521 Gm) (q)
- Semi-major axis: 1.15731642 AU (173.132072 Gm) (a)
- Eccentricity: 0.430576028 (e)
- Orbital period (sidereal): 1.25 Jyr (454.75 d)
- Mean anomaly: 175.227687° (M)
- Mean motion: 0° 47^{m} 29.892^{s} / day (n)
- Inclination: 0.340553512° (i)
- Longitude of ascending node: 35.9073158° (Ω)
- Argument of perihelion: 273.628156° (ω)
- Known satellites: none
- Earth MOID: 0.000433476 AU (64,847.1 km) (0.17 LD)
- Venus MOID: 0.0017 AU (0.66 LD)
- Mars MOID: 0.03884 AU (15.11 LD)
- Jupiter MOID: 3.60813 AU (539.769 Gm)
- T_{Jupiter}: 5.347

Physical characteristics
- Dimensions: 360±40 m
- Mean radius: 0.2 km
- Synodic rotation period: 18 h (0.75 d)
- Sidereal rotation period: 19.31±0.02 h
- Geometric albedo: 0.042±0.008
- Spectral type: C-type
- Absolute magnitude (H): 21.9

(308635) 2005 YU_{55} is a potentially hazardous asteroid 360±40 meters in diameter, as measured after its Earth flyby. Previously it was estimated to be 310 meters or about 400 m (1,300 feet) in diameter. It was discovered on 28 December 2005 by Robert S. McMillan at Steward Observatory, Kitt Peak. On 8 November 2011 it passed 0.85 lunar distances (330,000 km; 200,000 mi) from Earth.

== 8 November 2011 flyby ==
Trajectory of asteroid 2005 YU_{55} compared with the orbits of Earth and the Moon on 8–9 November 2011.

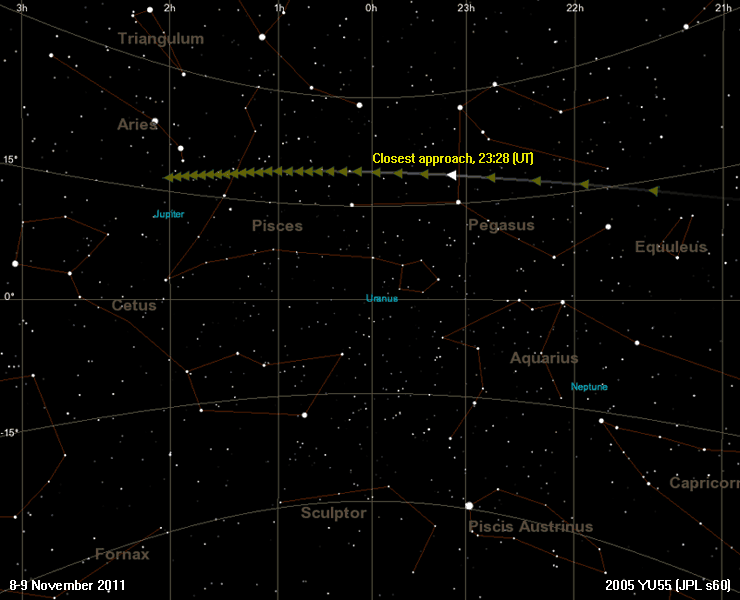
Apparent trajectory on 8–9 November 2011.

In February 2010, 2005 YU_{55} was rated 1 on the Torino Scale for a potential pass near Earth on 10 November 2103, that posed no unusual level of danger. On 19 April 2010, radar ranging by the Arecibo radio telescope reduced uncertainties about the orbit by 50%. This improvement eliminated any possibility of an impact with Earth within the next 100 years. It was removed from the Sentry Risk Table on 22 April 2010 and as such it now has a rating of 0 on the Torino Scale. It is now known that on 10 November 2103 2005 YU_{55} will be roughly 2 AU from Earth.

On 8 November 2011 at 23:28 UT the asteroid passed 0.85 LD (330,000 km; 200,000 mi) from Earth. On 9 November 2011 at 07:13 UT the asteroid passed 0.6231 LD (239,500 km; 148,800 mi) from the Moon. During the close approach the asteroid reached about apparent magnitude 11, and would have been visible to experienced observers using high-end binoculars with an objective lens of 80^{+} mm if it were not for bright moonlight preventing a true dark sky. Since the gibbous moon did interfere with the viewing, observers trying to visually locate the asteroid required a telescope with an aperture of 6 inches (15 centimeters) or larger.

The next few times a known asteroid this large will come this close to Earth will be in 2028 when (153814) 2001 WN5 passes 0.65 LD from Earth, and in 2029 when the 325-meter 99942 Apophis comes even closer at just 0.10 LD.

According to Jay Melosh, if an asteroid the size of 2005 YU_{55} (~400 m across) were to hit land, it would create a crater 6.3 km (3.9 mi) across, 518 m (1,699 ft) deep and generate a seven-magnitude-equivalent-earthquake. The chances of an actual collision with an asteroid like 2005 YU_{55} is about 1 percent in the next thousand years.

History of closest approaches of large near-Earth objects since 1914
(less than H 24 and 1 LD)^{(A)}

NEO	Date	Approach distance in lunar distances			Abs. mag (H)	Diameter ^{(C)} (m)	Ref ^{(D)}
NEO	Date	Nominal^{(B)}	Minimum	Maximum	Abs. mag (H)	Diameter ^{(C)} (m)	Ref ^{(D)}
(152680) 1998 KJ9	1914-12-31	0.606	0.604	0.608	19.4	279–900	data
(458732) 2011 MD5	1918-09-17	0.911	0.909	0.913	17.9	556–1795	data
(163132) 2002 CU11	1925-08-30	0.903	0.901	0.905	18.5	443–477	data
2010 VB1	1936-01-06	0.553	0.553	0.553	23.2	48–156	data
2002 JE9	1971-04-11	0.616	0.587	0.651	21.2	122–393	data
2013 UG1	1976-10-17	0.854	0.853	0.855	22.3	73–237	data
2012 TY52	1982-11-04	0.818	0.813	0.822	21.4	111–358	data
2012 UE34	1991-04-08	0.847	0.676	1.027	23.3	46–149	data
2017 VW13	2001-11-08	0.373	0.316	3.236	20.7	153–494	data
2002 MN	2002-06-14	0.312	0.312	0.312	23.6	40–130	data
(308635) 2005 YU55	2011-11-08	0.845	0.845	0.845	21.9	320–400	data
2011 XC2	2011-12-03	0.904	0.901	0.907	23.2	48–156	data
2018 AH	2018-01-02	0.773	0.772	0.773	22.5	67–216	data
2018 GE3	2018-04-15	0.502	0.501	0.503	23.7	35–135	data
2010 WC9	2018-05-15	0.528	0.528	0.528	23.5	42–136	data
(153814) 2001 WN5	2028-06-26	0.647	0.647	0.647	18.2	921–943	data
99942 Apophis	2029-04-13	0.0989	0.0989	0.0989	19.7	310–340	data
2012 UE_{34}	2041-04-08	0.283	0.274	0.354	23.3	46–149	data
2015 XJ351	2047-06-06	0.789	0.251	38.135	22.4	70–226	data
2007 TV18	2058-09-22	0.918	0.917	0.919	23.8	37–119	data
2005 WY55	2065-05-28	0.865	0.856	0.874	20.7	153–494	data
(308635) 2005 YU55	2075-11-08	0.592	0.499	0.752	21.9	320–400	data
(456938) 2007 YV56	2101-01-02	0.621	0.615	0.628	21.0	133–431	data
2007 UW1	2129-10-19	0.239	0.155	0.381	22.7	61–197	data
101955 Bennu	2135-09-25	0.531	0.507	0.555	20.19	472–512	data
(153201) 2000 WO107	2140-12-01	0.634	0.631	0.637	19.3	427–593	data
2009 DO111	2146-03-23	0.896	0.744	1.288	22.8	58–188	data
(85640) 1998 OX4	2148-01-22	0.771	0.770	0.771	21.1	127–411	data
2011 LT17	2156-12-16	0.998	0.955	1.215	21.6	101–327	data
^{(A)} This list includes near-Earth approaches of less than 1 lunar distances (LD) of objects with H brighter than 24.^{(B)} Nominal geocentric distance from the center of Earth to the center of the object (Earth has a radius of approximately 6,400 km).^{(C)} Diameter: estimated, theoretical mean-diameter based on H and albedo range between 0.05 and 0.25.^{(D)} Reference: data source from the JPL SBDB, with AU converted into LD (1 AU≈390 LD)^{(E)} Color codes: unobserved at close approach observed during close approach upcoming approaches Note: All close approaches between 1900 and 2200 are listed (with H<24 at less than 1 LD). Objects not observed during the approach, and simply estimated to have approached on this date, are colored grey. Generically estimated asteroid diameters are given in italics.

== Study ==
Swift captures flyby of asteroid 2005 YU_{55}.

During the 2011 passage 2005 YU_{55} was studied with radar using Goldstone, Arecibo, the Very Long Baseline Array, and the Green Bank Telescope. The Herschel Space Observatory has made far-infrared measurements of 2005 YU_{55} on 10 November, helping determine its temperature and composition.

Radar analysis has also helped to pin down the asteroid's albedo, or diffuse reflectivity. Although radar measurements do not detect visible light they can determine the distance and size of an object with a high degree of accuracy. This information, coupled with visible light measurements, provides a more accurate measure of an object's absolute magnitude, and therefore its albedo.

On 8 November 2011, NASA released a statement mentioning a number of structures on the surface of the asteroid, which were detected as it passed near Earth. On 11 November 2011, higher-resolution images showed concavities, a ridge near the asteroid's equator, and numerous features interpreted as decameter-scale boulders. Shape modeling based on the radar images shows that YU55's shape is close to spheroidal, with maximum dimensions of 360±40 m, and an equator-aligned ridge. A 150–200 meter-long, ~20 meter-high rise forms a portion of the ridge-line, and the number of boulders on the surface is comparable to that seen on the asteroid 25143 Itokawa by the Hayabusa spacecraft.

Optical lightcurve measurements during the flyby provided a more accurate estimate of the asteroid's spin period – about 19.3 hours. Because 2005 YU_{55} is so nearly spheroidal, it was not significantly torqued by Earth's tides during the flyby, and there is no evidence of non-principal-axis rotation. Optical, near-infrared, and ultraviolet spectroscopy confirmed that 2005 YU_{55} is a C-type asteroid.

== Future trajectory ==
On 19 January 2029, 2005 YU_{55} will pass 0.0023 AU (340,000 km; 210,000 mi) from Venus. The close approach distance to Venus in 2029 will determine how close the asteroid will pass to Earth in 2041. Before the November 2011 observations, the uncertainties in the post-2029 trajectory showed that the asteroid would pass somewhere between 0.002 AU (300,000 km; 190,000 mi) and 0.3 AU (45,000,000 km; 28,000,000 mi) of Earth in 2041. Radar astrometry in November 2011 clarified the Earth passage in 2041 and beyond. As a result of the November 2011 radar observations, it is now known that 2005 YU_{55} will pass between 0.1017 AU (15,210,000 km; 9,450,000 mi) and 0.1020 AU of Earth on 12 November 2041. Using the current uncertainty region integrated until the future, the 2075 approach will be between 0.0013 AU (190,000 km; 120,000 mi) and 0.0021 AU (310,000 km; 200,000 mi).

Preceded by 2002 MN	Large NEO Earth close approach (inside the orbit of the Moon); 8 November 2011, and 8 November 2075	Succeeded by 2011 XC2
