= 2018 AH =

Near-Earth asteroid Christmas 2021

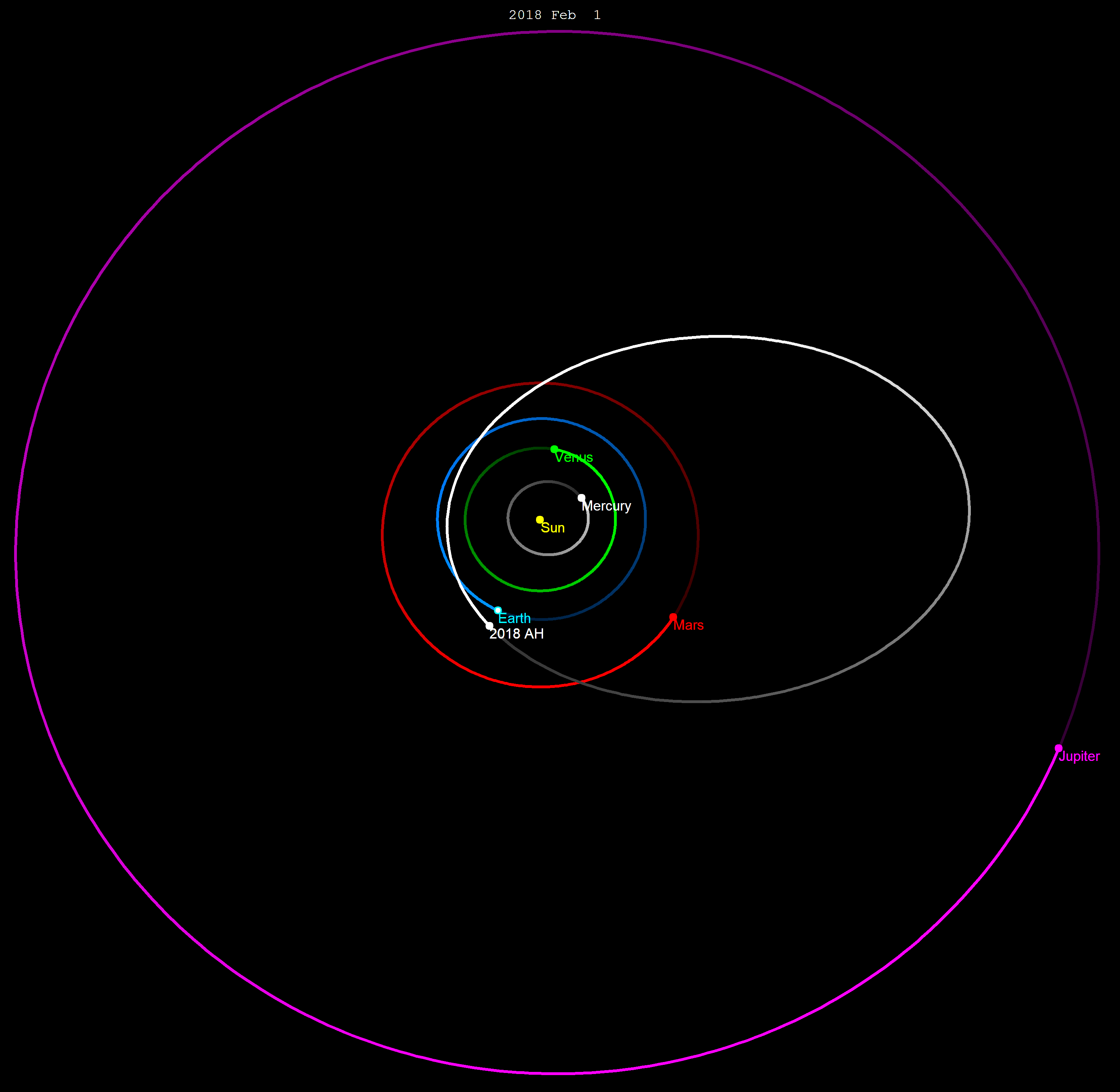
- Orbital diagram of 2018 AH with the planets of the inner Solar System

Discovery
- Discovered by: ATLAS–MLO
- Discovery site: Mauna Loa Obs.
- Discovery date: 4 January 2018 (first observed only)

Designations
- Minor planet category: NEO · Apollo

Orbital characteristics
- Epoch 2022-Jan-21 (JD 2459600.5)
- Uncertainty parameter 0
- Observation arc: 4.01 years
- Aphelion: 4.1154 AU
- Perihelion: 0.91547 AU
- Semi-major axis: 2.5155 AU
- Eccentricity: 0.63606
- Orbital period (sidereal): 3.99 yr (1,457 days)
- Mean anomaly: 11.96°
- Mean motion: 0° 14^{m} 50.64^{s} / day
- Inclination: 12.429°
- Longitude of ascending node: 101.2°
- Time of perihelion: 2021-Dec-03
- Argument of perihelion: 322.9°
- Earth MOID: 0.0065 AU (2.5 LD)

Physical characteristics
- Mean diameter: 80–170 meters (2022); 84–190 m (assumed)
- Geometric albedo: 0.05–0.25 (assumed)
- Apparent magnitude: ~13 (peak 2018-01-03)
- Absolute magnitude (H): 22.7

2018 AH is a sub-kilometer asteroid, classified as a near-Earth object of the Apollo group, approximately 100 m (300 ft) in diameter. It was first observed on 4 January 2018, by the Asteroid Terrestrial-impact Last Alert System (ATLAS) on Mauna Loa and quickly followed-up by many other surveys, with precovery observations found from Pan-STARRS and PTF from the day previous.

It is the largest known asteroid to pass so close to Earth (0.001985 AU (297,000 km; 184,500 mi)) since 2002 JE9 in 1971, and until 2001 WN_{5} in 2028, although it was only discovered two days after its closest approach on 2 January 2018, at 04:25 UTC. The Tunguska asteroid was likely of a similar size, if not slightly smaller.

Before being recovered on 4 January 2022 11:49 UTC at an Earth distance of 9.8 million km, the asteroid only had an observation arc of 46 days and had not been observed since February 2018. Being a short arc object that had not been observed for years generated an uncertainty that is relatively large. Between 24–31 December 2021 it was only known to make an Earth approach of between 1-8 million km. As it came to perihelion on 3 December 2021, it was approaching from the direction of the Sun.

2021 close approach
Date	JPL SBDB nominal geocentric distance	uncertainty region (3-sigma)
2021-12-27.7 ± 3.6 days (as known before recovery)	4.5 million km	± 3.6 million km
2021-12-27.548 (as known after recovery)	4.68 million km	± 83 km

== Description ==
2018 AH has a fairly eccentric orbit, and its distance to the Sun therefore varies from as close as 90% of the Sun-Earth distance to over 4 times that distance. Due to this, among other factors, the asteroid remained undiscovered until its 2018 approach. It is almost always dimmer than magnitude 23, dimmer than most asteroid surveys can detect. During August–October 2013 it approached within ~0.3 AU of Earth and became as bright as magnitude 22.4, still rather dimmer than most survey-discovered asteroids, and it was not noticed.

=== 2018 Approach ===
On its approach to Earth in 2018, 2018 AH had recently passed perihelion and was moving outwards on its orbit. It therefore approached from roughly the direction of the Sun, where it was undetectable to ground-based optical observations. It reached its closest point to Earth at only 45 degrees from the Sun. It was discovered at a more observable elongation of 129 degrees and at a magnitude of 15.7, and was quickly followed up over the next several days due to its brightness. 2018 AH remained brighter than magnitude 23 until late February 2018, and once more became mostly unobservable until its next Earth approach in December 2021.

2018 AH passed unusually close for such a bright asteroid, at an absolute magnitude of 22.5 (making it approximately 84–190 meters across). The largest asteroid to pass so close to Earth in 2017 was only an absolute magnitude of 24.3 (or about 31–91 meters). Since 1900, the only asteroids larger than 2018 AH known to pass closer than it to Earth are listed below:

Asteroid diameters marked in italics have had their size directly measured.

Designation	Date	Distance (thousand km)	H	Diameter (meters)
Tunguska asteroid	1908-06-30	Impact	~23?	60–190
(152680) 1998 KJ9	1914-12-31	232.9	19.4	279–900
2002 JE9	1971-04-11	237.0	21.2	122–393
2018 AH	2018-01-02	297.0	22.5	84–190
(153814) 2001 WN5	2028-06-26	248.7	18.3	921–943
99942 Apophis	2029-04-13	37.8	19.7	310–340
(308635) 2005 YU55	2075-11-08	228.1	21.9	320–400
(456938) 2007 YV56	2101-01-02	238.8	21.0	133–431
(153201) 2000 WO107	2140-12-01	243.6	19.3	427–593
(85640) 1998 OX4	2148-01-22	296.2	21.1	127–411

H < 23 asteroids passing less than 1 LD from Earth
Asteroid	Date	Nominal approach distance (LD)	Min. distance (LD)	Max. distance (LD)	Absolute magnitude (H)	Size (meters)
(152680) 1998 KJ9	1914-12-31	0.606	0.604	0.608	19.4	279–900
(458732) 2011 MD5	1918-09-17	0.911	0.909	0.913	17.9	556–1795
(163132) 2002 CU11	1925-08-30	0.903	0.901	0.905	18.5	443–477
2002 JE9	1971-04-11	0.616	0.587	0.651	21.2	122–393
2013 UG1	1976-10-17	0.854	0.853	0.855	22.3	73–237
2012 TY52	1981-11-04	0.818	0.813	0.823	21.4	111–358
2017 VW13	2001-11-08	0.454	0.318	3.436	20.7	153–494
(308635) 2005 YU55	2011-11-08	0.845	0.845	0.845	21.9	320–400
2018 AH	2018-01-02	0.773	0.772	0.773	22.5	67–216
(153814) 2001 WN5	2028-06-26	0.647	0.647	0.647	18.2	921–943
99942 Apophis	2029-04-13	0.0981	0.0963	0.1000	19.7	310–340
2015 XJ351	2047-06-06	0.789	0.251	38.135	22.4	70–226
2005 WY55	2065-05-28	0.865	0.856	0.874	20.7	153–494
(308635) 2005 YU_{55}	2075-11-08	0.592	0.499	0.752	21.9	320–400
(456938) 2007 YV56	2101-01-02	0.621	0.615	0.628	21.0	133–431
2007 UW1	2129-10-19	0.239	0.155	0.381	22.7	61–197
101955 Bennu	2135-09-25	0.780	0.308	1.406	20.19	472–512
(153201) 2000 WO107	2140-12-01	0.634	0.631	0.637	19.3	427–593
2009 DO111	2146-03-23	0.896	0.744	1.288	22.8	58–188
(85640) 1998 OX4	2148-01-22	0.771	0.770	0.771	21.1	127–411
2007 UY1	2156-02-13	0.685	0.652	6.856	22.9	56–179
2011 LT17	2156-12-16	0.998	0.955	1.215	21.6	101–327

== See also ==
- 2020 AP1 – Short arc object (not recently observed) approaching in January 2022
- 2009 JF1 – Short arc object (not recently observed) possibly approaching in May 2022
- List of asteroid close approaches to Earth in 2018
