= 2015 TB145 =

Potentially hazardous near-Earth asteroid

2015 TB_{145}
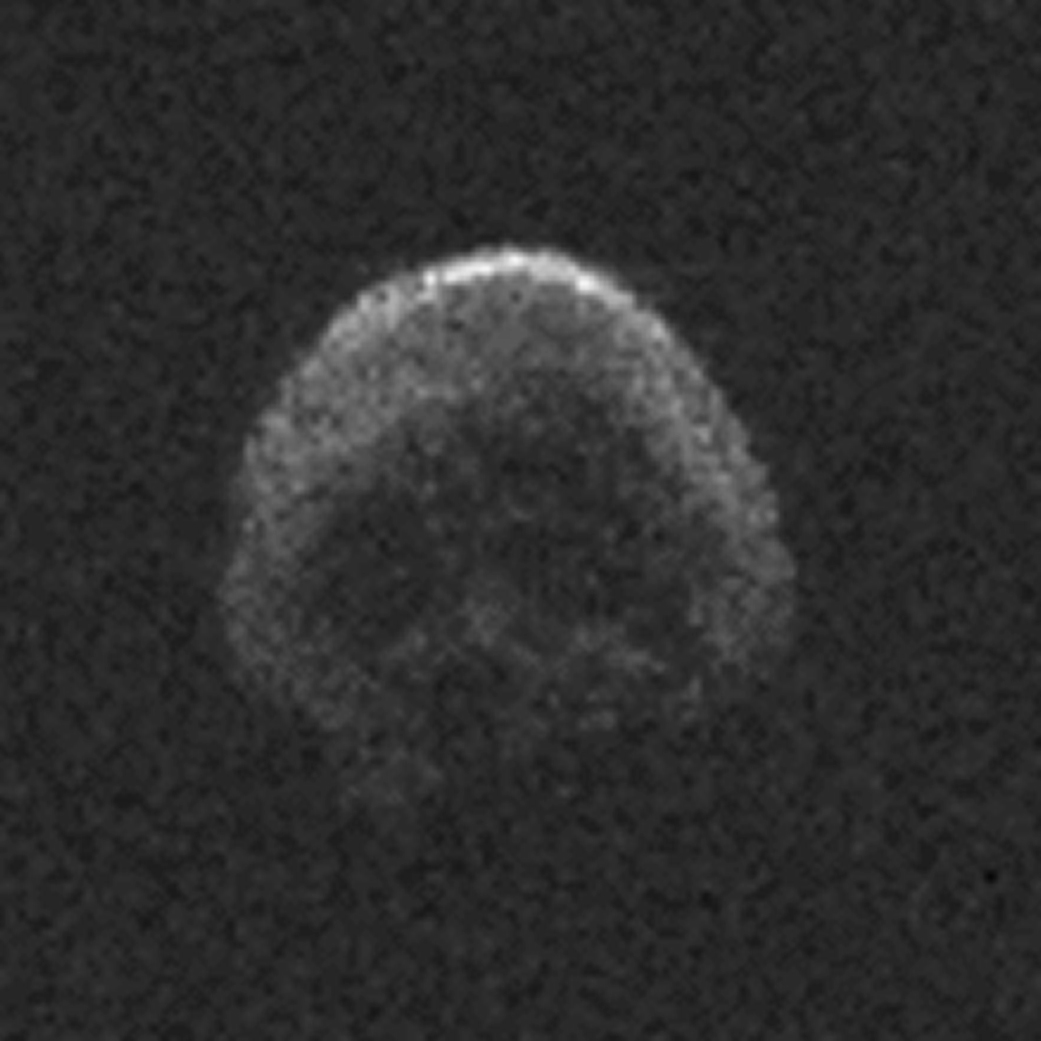
- Radar image of 2015 TB_{145} taken by the Arecibo Observatory on 30 October 2015

Discovery
- Discovered by: Pan-STARRS
- Discovery date: 10 October 2015

Designations
- Minor planet category: Apollo; NEO; PHA; Mercury-crosser; Venus-crosser; Mars-crosser

Orbital characteristics
- Epoch 31 May 2020 (JD 2459000.5)
- Uncertainty parameter 0
- Observation arc: 3.11 yr (1,137 d)
- Aphelion: 3.9073 AU
- Perihelion: 0.2941 AU
- Semi-major axis: 2.1007 AU
- Eccentricity: 0.86002
- Orbital period (sidereal): 3.04 yr (1,112.1 d)
- Mean anomaly: 121.744°
- Mean motion: 0° 19^{m} 25.364^{s} / day
- Inclination: 39.6899°
- Longitude of ascending node: 37.698°
- Argument of perihelion: 121.744°
- Earth MOID: 0.00295731 AU (442,407 km)
- Jupiter MOID: 2.41052 AU
- T_{Jupiter}: 2.97

Physical characteristics
- Dimensions: 650±30 m (2130±100 ft); 600 m
- Synodic rotation period: 5 hours; 2.938 h (0.1224 d)
- Geometric albedo: 0.06
- Absolute magnitude (H): 20.0

2015 TB_{145} is a sub-kilometer asteroid, classified as a near-Earth object and potentially hazardous asteroid of the Apollo group, approximately 650 meters (2,000 feet) in diameter. It safely passed 1.27 lunar distances from Earth on 31 October 2015 at 17:01 UTC, and passed by Earth again in November 2018.

== Discovery ==
Discovery image of 2015 TB_{145} from the Pan-STARRS1 telescope, operated by the Institute for Astronomy at the University of Hawaii

The asteroid was first observed on 10 October 2015 by Pan-STARRS at an apparent magnitude of 20 using a 1.8-meter (71 in) Ritchey–Chrétien telescope. (Note: For comparison, around 6 October 2012, the asteroid peaked at about apparent magnitude 20.9, but had a solar elongation of only about 75 degrees while 0.4 AU from Earth.) The asteroid was not discovered sooner because it spends most of its time beyond the orbit of Mars, has a large orbital inclination, and is usually well below the plane of the ecliptic. The asteroid last passed within 0.064 AU (9,600,000 km; 5,900,000 mi) of Earth on 29 October 1923 and will not pass that close again until 1 November 2088.

The media has nicknamed the asteroid the "Great Pumpkin" after the animated Halloween television special It's the Great Pumpkin, Charlie Brown, "Spooky", the "Halloween Asteroid", and the "Skull Asteroid" due to its skull-like appearance following radio frequency images taken at Arecibo Observatory and closest approach coincidentally occurring on Halloween day.

== 2015 flyby ==
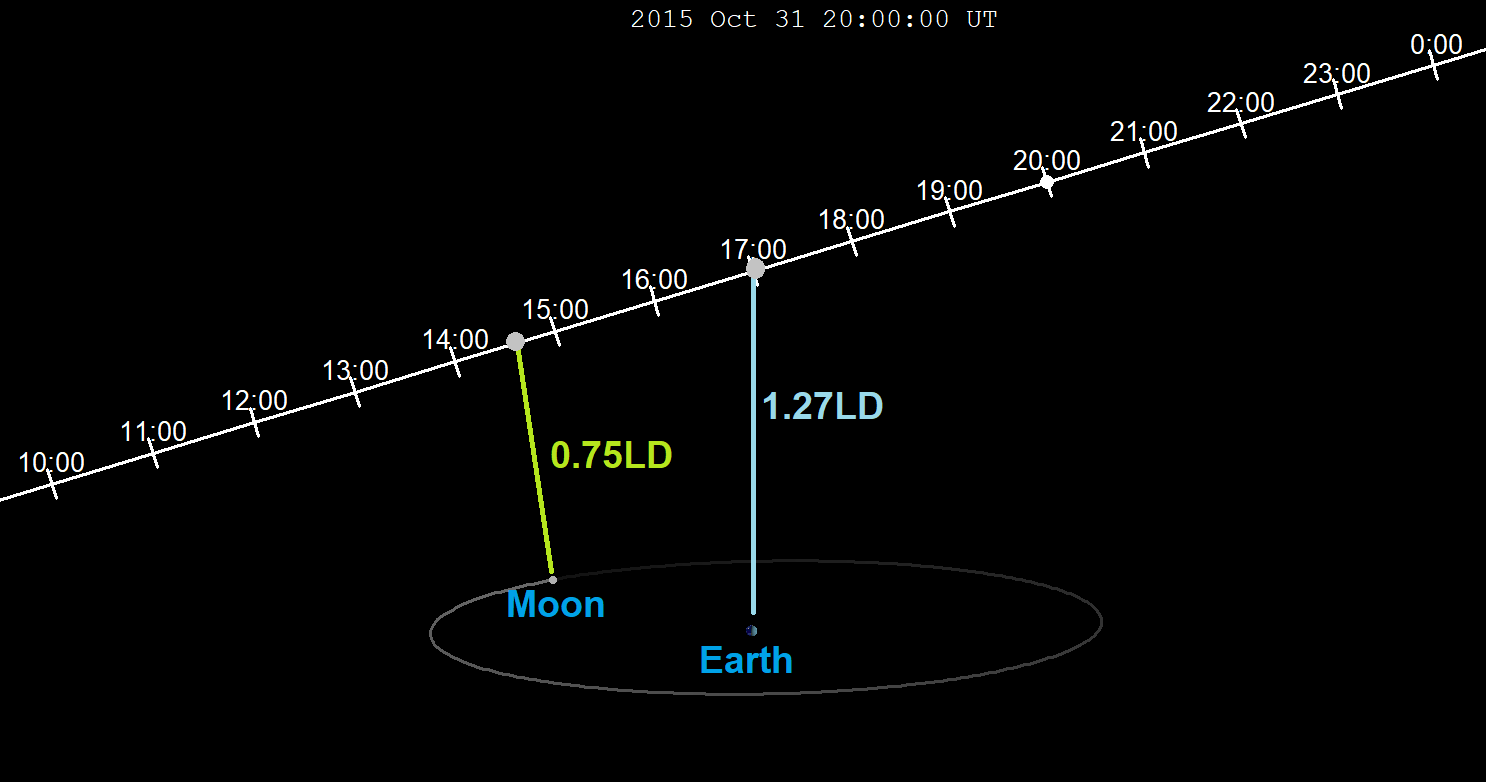
2015 TB_{145} passed 1.27 LD from the Earth, and 0.75 LD from the Moon.

On 31 October 2015 the asteroid passed 0.00191 AU (286,000 km; 178,000 mi) from the Moon and then passed 0.00325 AU (486,000 km; 302,000 mi) from Earth.

The last approach this close by an object with absolute magnitude brighter than 20 was (612901) 2004 XP14 on 3 July 2006 at 1.1 lunar distances. The next object this large known to pass this close to Earth is (137108) 1999 AN10 that will pass about 1 lunar distance from Earth on 7 August 2027. It is estimated that there are about 2400 near-Earth asteroids 300–500 meters in diameter, of which about 1100 have been discovered.

During closest approach to Earth the asteroid reached about apparent magnitude 10, which is much too faint to be seen by the naked eye. Even at peak brightness, the asteroid was a challenging target for amateur astronomers with small telescopes, best seen in the Northern Hemisphere. The glare from an 80% waning gibbous Moon also hindered observations.

At 11:00 UT the asteroid was in the constellation of Taurus about 9 degrees from the Moon and moving at a rate of 3.4 degrees per hour. At the time of closest approach of 17:00 UT the asteroid was in the constellation of Ursa Major about 56 degrees from the Moon and moving at a rate of 14.7 degrees per hour. After closest approach it quickly became too faint and too close to the Sun in the sky to be seen.

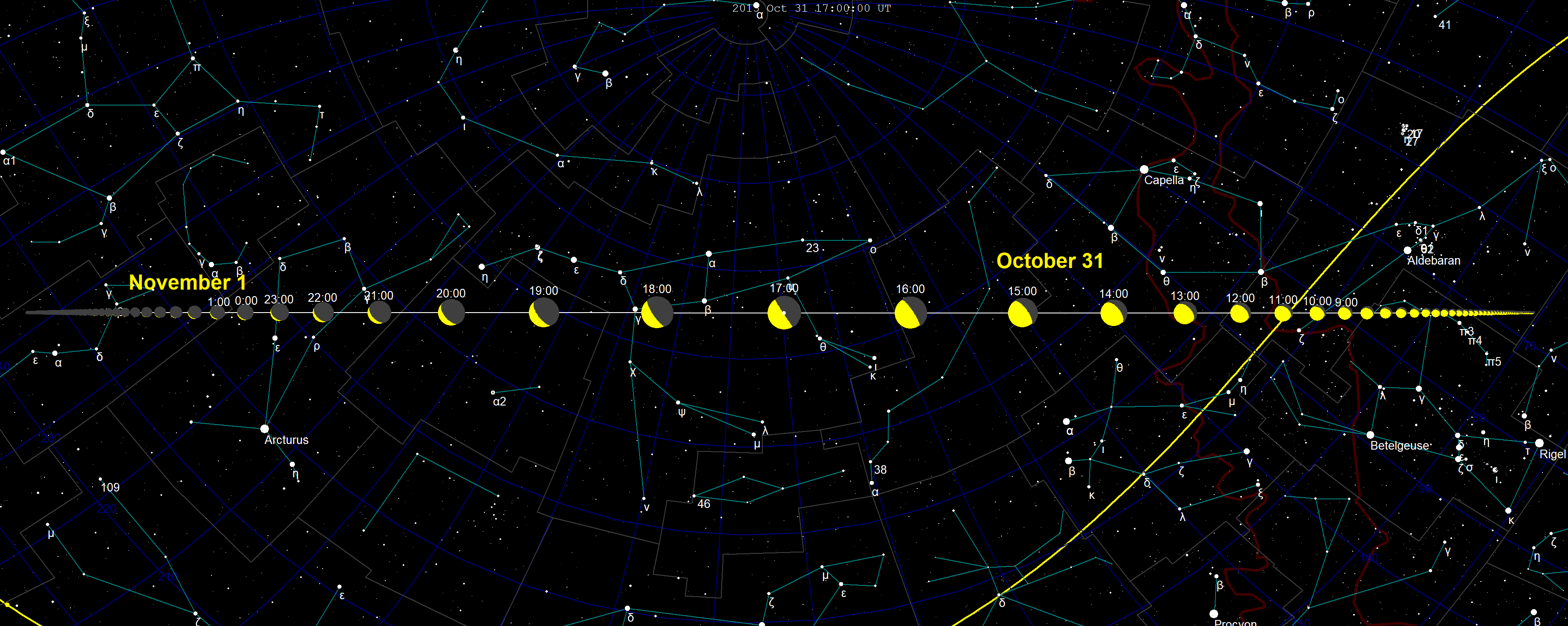

History of close approaches of large near-Earth objects since 1908 ^{(A)}

PHA	Date	Approach distance in lunar distances			Abs. mag (H)	Diameter ^{(C)} (m)	Ref ^{(D)}
PHA	Date	Nominal^{(B)}	Minimum	Maximum	Abs. mag (H)	Diameter ^{(C)} (m)	Ref ^{(D)}
(152680) 1998 KJ9	1914-12-31	0.606	0.604	0.608	19.4	279–900	data
(458732) 2011 MD5	1918-09-17	0.911	0.909	0.913	17.9	556–1795	data
(163132) 2002 CU11	1925-08-30	0.903	0.901	0.905	18.5	443–477	data
69230 Hermes	1937-10-30	1.926	1.926	1.927	17.5	700-900	data
69230 Hermes	1942-04-26	1.651	1.651	1.651	17.5	700-900	data
2017 NM6	1959-07-12	1.89	1.846	1.934	18.8	580–1300	data
(27002) 1998 DV9	1975-01-31	1.762	1.761	1.762	18.1	507–1637	data
2002 NY40	2002-08-18	1.371	1.371	1.371	19.0	335–1082	data
(612901) 2004 XP1414	2006-07-03	1.125	1.125	1.125	19.3	292–942	data
2015 TB145	2015-10-31	1.266	1.266	1.266	20.0	620-690	data
(137108) 1999 AN10	2027-08-07	1.014	1.010	1.019	17.9	556–1793	data
(153814) 2001 WN5	2028-06-26	0.647	0.647	0.647	18.2	921–943	data
99942 Apophis	2029-04-13	0.0981	0.0963	0.1000	19.7	310–340	data
2017 MB1	2072-07-26	1.216	1.215	2.759	18.8	367–1186	data
2011 SM68	2072-10-17	1.875	1.865	1.886	19.6	254–820	data
(163132) 2002 CU_{11}	2080-08-31	1.655	1.654	1.656	18.5	443–477	data
(416801) 1998 MZ	2116-11-26	1.068	1.068	1.069	19.2	305–986	data
(153201) 2000 WO107	2140-12-01	0.634	0.631	0.637	19.3	427–593	data
(276033) 2002 AJ129	2172-02-08	1.783	1.775	1.792	18.7	385–1242	data
(290772) 2005 VC	2198-05-05	1.951	1.791	2.134	17.6	638–2061	data
^{(A)} This list includes near-Earth approaches of less than 2 lunar distances (LD) of objects with H brighter than 20.^{(B)} Nominal geocentric distance from the center of Earth to the center of the object (Earth has a radius of approximately 6,400 km).^{(C)} Diameter: estimated, theoretical mean-diameter based on H and albedo range between X and Y.^{(D)} Reference: data source from the JPL SBDB, with AU converted into LD (1 AU≈390 LD)^{(E)} Color codes: unobserved at close approach observed during close approach upcoming approaches

== 2018 flyby ==
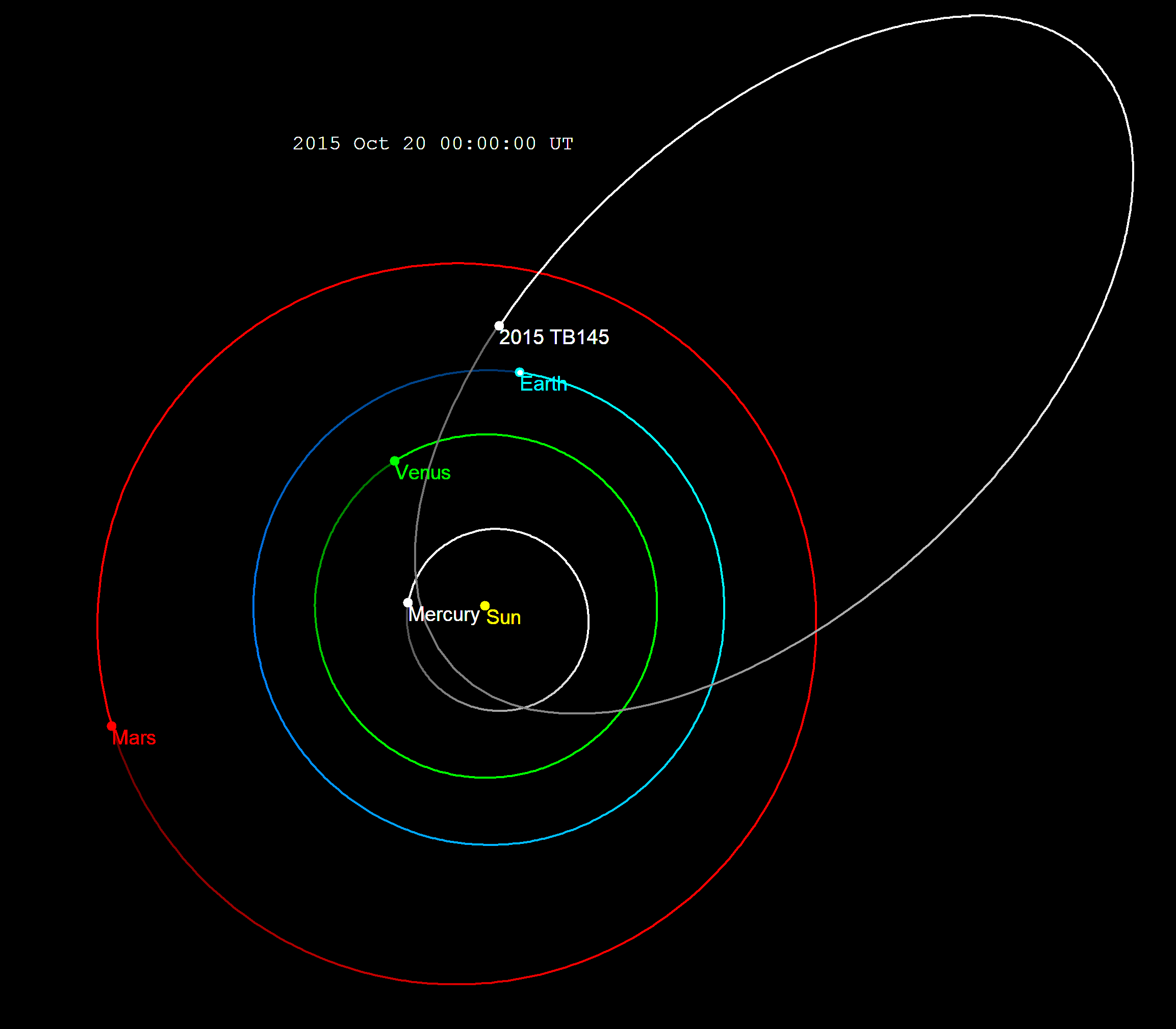
Orbit of 2015 TB_{145}

After it had been unobservable for almost three years, 2015 TB_{145} was recovered on 7 October 2018 by L. Buzzi at Schiaparelli Observatory (observatory code 204), at apparent magnitude 21.

The 11 November 2018 flyby was about 0.267 AU (39,900,000 km; 24,800,000 mi) from Earth.

== Observations ==
=== Radar imagery ===
The close approach was studied with radar using Goldstone, the Green Bank Telescope, and the Arecibo Observatory. It was one of the best radar targets of the year with a resolution as high as 2 meters (7 ft) per pixel. Bistatic radar images created with the Green Bank Telescope had a resolution of 4 meters (13 ft) per pixel. Arecibo images had a resolution of 7.5 meters (25 ft) per pixel.

30 October	31 October 12:55–13:08 UTC	1 November

== Possible cometary origin ==
The high orbital inclination and eccentricity suggest 2015 TB_{145} may be an extinct comet that has shed its volatiles after numerous passes around the Sun. Orbital calculations by Petrus Jenniskens and Jérémie Vaubaillon showed that it was not expected to produce associated meteors in 2015. Any meteoroids were expected to pass more than 0.0007 AU (100,000 km; 65,000 mi) from Earth's orbit.

If meteoroids related to this asteroid were to cross Earth's path, the radiant is expected to be near Northern Eridanus. Cameras for Allsky Meteor Surveillance (CAMS) did not detect any activity in the presumed area of the sky during 2013 and 2014. The object has a low albedo of 0.06, which is only slightly more than a typical comet that has an albedo of 0.03–0.05.
