= 2007 UW1 =

Sub-kilometer asteroid

2007 UW_{1}
Discovery
- Discovered by: Lowell Observatory-LONEOS
- Discovery site: Anderson Mesa Station, near Flagstaff, Arizona
- Discovery date: October 17, 2007

Designations
- Alternative designations: MPO 279093
- Minor planet category: Aten NEO

Orbital characteristics
- Epoch 21 November 2025 (JD 2461000.5)
- Uncertainty parameter 1
- Observation arc: 2239 days 6.13 yr
- Aphelion: 1.01712759 AU (152.160122 Gm)
- Perihelion: 0.79768780 AU (119.332396 Gm)
- Semi-major axis: 0.90740769 AU (135.746258 Gm)
- Eccentricity: 0.1209158
- Orbital period (sidereal): 0.86 yr (315.7 d)
- Average orbital speed: 31.147779 km/s
- Mean anomaly: 196.02469°
- Mean motion: 1.1402508°/day
- Inclination: 8.215966°
- Longitude of ascending node: 25.921307°
- Argument of perihelion: 146.57824°
- Earth MOID: 0.0015674 AU (234,480 km)
- Jupiter MOID: 3.94546 AU (590.232 Gm)

Physical characteristics
- Dimensions: 80–180 m
- Absolute magnitude (H): 22.7

2007 UW_{1} is a sub-kilometer asteroid that is a near-Earth object of the Aten group.

H < 23 asteroids passing less than 1 LD from Earth
Asteroid	Date	Nominal approach distance (LD)	Min. distance (LD)	Max. distance (LD)	Absolute magnitude (H)	Size (meters)
(152680) 1998 KJ9	1914-12-31	0.606	0.604	0.608	19.4	279–900
(458732) 2011 MD5	1918-09-17	0.911	0.909	0.913	17.9	556–1795
(163132) 2002 CU11	1925-08-30	0.903	0.901	0.905	18.5	443–477
2002 JE9	1971-04-11	0.616	0.587	0.651	21.2	122–393
2013 UG1	1976-10-17	0.854	0.853	0.855	22.3	73–237
2012 TY52	1981-11-04	0.818	0.813	0.823	21.4	111–358
2017 VW13	2001-11-08	0.454	0.318	3.436	20.7	153–494
(308635) 2005 YU55	2011-11-08	0.845	0.845	0.845	21.9	320–400
2018 AH	2018-01-02	0.773	0.772	0.773	22.5	67–216
(153814) 2001 WN5	2028-06-26	0.647	0.647	0.647	18.2	921–943
99942 Apophis	2029-04-13	0.0981	0.0963	0.1000	19.7	310–340
2015 XJ351	2047-06-06	0.789	0.251	38.135	22.4	70–226
2005 WY55	2065-05-28	0.865	0.856	0.874	20.7	153–494
(308635) 2005 YU_{55}	2075-11-08	0.592	0.499	0.752	21.9	320–400
(456938) 2007 YV56	2101-01-02	0.621	0.615	0.628	21.0	133–431
2007 UW_{1}	2129-10-19	0.239	0.155	0.381	22.7	61–197
101955 Bennu	2135-09-25	0.780	0.308	1.406	20.19	472–512
(153201) 2000 WO107	2140-12-01	0.634	0.631	0.637	19.3	427–593
2009 DO111	2146-03-23	0.896	0.744	1.288	22.8	58–188
(85640) 1998 OX4	2148-01-22	0.771	0.770	0.771	21.1	127–411
2007 UY1	2156-02-13	0.685	0.652	6.856	22.9	56–179
2011 LT17	2156-12-16	0.998	0.955	1.215	21.6	101–327

== Orbit ==
The orbit of 2007 UW_{1} has been established with more than a 6-year observation arc. It will pass within 0.001 AU (150,000 km; 93,000 mi) of Earth on 19 October 2129. For comparison, the distance to the Moon is about 0.0026 AU (384,400 km).

Preceded by 2007 YV56	Large NEO Earth close approach (inside the orbit of the Moon); 19 October 2129	Succeeded by (153201) 2000 WO107
