= 2020 AP1 =

Near-Earth asteroid in January 2022

2020 AP_{1}
Discovery
- Discovered by: MLS
- Discovery site: Mount Lemmon Obs.
- Discovery date: 4 January 2020

Designations
- Minor planet category: NEO–Apollo

Orbital characteristics
- Epoch 2020-May-31 (JD 2459000.5)
- Uncertainty parameter 7
- Observation arc: 1 day
- Aphelion: 2.196 AU (328,500,000 km) (Q)
- Perihelion: 0.9810 AU (146,760,000 km) (q)
- Semi-major axis: 1.588 AU (237,600,000 km) (a)
- Eccentricity: 0.3824 (e)
- Orbital period (sidereal): 2.002 yr
- Mean anomaly: 77.83° (M)
- Inclination: 2.256° (i)
- Longitude of ascending node: 101.2° (Ω)
- Time of perihelion: 25 December 2021
- Argument of perihelion: 349.7° (ω)
- Earth MOID: 0.0014 AU (210,000 km; 0.54 LD)
- Jupiter MOID: 3.0 AU (450,000,000 km)

Physical characteristics
- Mean diameter: 3–7 meters (CNEOS)
- Absolute magnitude (H): 29.6

2020 AP_{1} is an Apollo near-Earth object roughly 5 meters (20 feet) in diameter. On 2 January 2020 it passed 0.00218 AU (326 thousand km; 0.85 LD) from Earth. With a short 1-day observation arc it was roughly expected to pass about 0.01 AU (1.5 million km; 3.9 LD) from Earth on 7 January 2022, but with an uncertainty of ±8 days for the close approach date it could have passed significantly closer or further.

2022 close approach
Date	JPL SBDB nominal geocentric distance	uncertainty region (3-sigma)
2022-01-07.7 ± 8.3 days	1.7 million km	± 2.5 million km

== Discovery ==
2020 AP_{1} came to perihelion (closest approach to the Sun) on 24 December 2020. On 2 January 2020 it passed 0.00218 AU (326 thousand km; 0.85 LD) from Earth. It was then discovered by the Mount Lemmon Survey on 4 January 2020, when it was 0.006 AU (900 thousand km; 2.3 LD) from Earth and had a solar elongation of 134°. Being such a small and faint asteroid with the bright glare of the waxing gibbous moon in the sky, it was only observed for 1 day. The Earth approach increased the asteroid's orbital period by roughly 21 days.

== 2022 ==
The asteroid came to perihelion around 25 December 2021. The poorly constrained orbit has the asteroid passing 0.01 AU (1.5 million km; 3.9 LD) from Earth on 7 January 2022 with an uncertainty region of about ±2.5 million km extending over ±8 days.

The JPL Small-Body Database shows a linear minimum possible distance of 0.000007 AU (1,000 km) from the center of Earth, which would be inside of the 6,371 km radius of Earth. It is not listed on the more thorough Sentry Risk Table because Sentry accounts for orbit propagation nonlinearities along the line of variations and the nonlinearities do not intersect where Earth will be.

== See also ==
- 2018 AH – Short arc object approaching in December 2021
- 2009 JF1 – Short arc object possibly approaching in May 2022
