= (612358) 2002 JE9 =

Apollo near-Earth asteroid

(612358) 2002 JE_{9}
Discovery
- Discovered by: LINEAR (704); 1.0-m Reflector
- Discovery date: 6 May 2002

Designations
- Minor planet category: Apollo NEO, PHA

Orbital characteristics
- Epoch 13 January 2016 (JD 2457400.5)
- Uncertainty parameter 0
- Observation arc: 4014 days (10.99 yr)
- Aphelion: 1.5126 AU (226,280,000 km) (Q)
- Perihelion: 0.62292 AU (93,188,000 km) (q)
- Semi-major axis: 1.0678 AU (159,740,000 km) (a)
- Eccentricity: 0.41662 (e)
- Orbital period (sidereal): 1.10 yr (403.01 d)
- Mean anomaly: 221.24° (M)
- Mean motion: 0° 53^{m} 35.772^{s} /day (n)
- Inclination: 8.8300° (i)
- Longitude of ascending node: 200.08° (Ω)
- Argument of perihelion: 255.43° (ω)
- Earth MOID: 0.00548821 AU (821,025 km)
- Jupiter MOID: 3.70534 AU (554,311,000 km)

Physical characteristics
- Dimensions: ~200 meters (660 ft)
- Absolute magnitude (H): 21.2

(612358) 2002 JE_{9} is an Apollo near-Earth asteroid and potentially hazardous object. It has a well determined orbit with an observation arc of 10 years and an Uncertainty Parameter of 1. It was removed from the Sentry Risk Table on 10 May 2002. 2002 JE_{9} was discovered on 6 May 2002 by the Lincoln Near-Earth Asteroid Research (LINEAR) project using a 1.0-metre (39 in) Reflecting telescope; at the time of discovery, the asteroid possessed an apparent magnitude of 19.1.

The asteroid has an estimated diameter of about 200 meters (660 ft) based on an absolute magnitude of 21.3. 2002 JE_{9} is considered significant due to having previously passed closer to the Earth; on 11 April 1971, it passed Earth at a distance of 0.0015 AU (220,000 km; 140,000 mi). 2002 JE_{9} is one of the largest objects known to have passed inside the orbit of the moon. During the close approach in 1971 the asteroid reached about apparent magnitude 10, about the same brightness as Saturn's moon Iapetus.

The asteroid will pass 0.0049 AU (730,000 km; 460,000 mi) from Venus on 25 November 2021.

H < 22 asteroids passing less than 1 LD from Earth
Asteroid	Date	Nominal approach distance (LD)	Min. distance (LD)	Max. distance (LD)	Absolute magnitude (H)	Size (meters)
(152680) 1998 KJ9	1914-12-31	0.606	0.604	0.608	19.4	279–900
(458732) 2011 MD5	1918-09-17	0.911	0.909	0.913	17.9	556–1795
(163132) 2002 CU11	1925-08-30	0.903	0.901	0.905	18.5	443–477
2002 JE_{9}	1971-04-11	0.616	0.587	0.651	21.2	122–393
2012 TY52	1981-11-04	0.818	0.813	0.823	21.4	111–358
2017 VW13	2001-11-08	0.454	0.318	3.436	20.7	153–494
(308635) 2005 YU55	2011-11-08	0.845	0.845	0.845	21.9	320–400
(153814) 2001 WN5	2028-06-26	0.647	0.647	0.647	18.2	921–943
99942 Apophis	2029-04-13	0.0981	0.0963	0.1000	19.7	310–340
2005 WY55	2065-05-28	0.865	0.856	0.874	20.7	153–494
(308635) 2005 YU_{55}	2075-11-08	0.592	0.499	0.752	21.9	320–400
(456938) 2007 YV56	2101-01-02	0.621	0.615	0.628	21.0	133–431
101955 Bennu	2135-09-25	0.780	0.308	1.406	20.19	472–512
(153201) 2000 WO107	2140-12-01	0.634	0.631	0.637	19.3	427–593
(85640) 1998 OX4	2148-01-22	0.771	0.770	0.771	21.1	127–411
2011 LT17	2156-12-16	0.998	0.955	1.215	21.6	101–327

Preceded by (163132) 2002 CU11	Large NEO Earth close approach (inside the orbit of the Moon); 11 April 1971	Succeeded by 2002 MN
