= (85640) 1998 OX4 =

Sub-kilometer asteroid

(85640) 1998 OX_{4}
Discovery
- Discovered by: Spacewatch
- Discovery site: Kitt Peak National Obs.
- Discovery date: 26 July 1998

Designations
- Alternative designations: MPO 267962
- Minor planet category: NEO; Apollo; PHA; Mars crosser

Orbital characteristics
- Epoch 13 January 2016 (JD 2457400.5)
- Uncertainty parameter 0
- Observation arc: 3656 days (10.01 yr)
- Aphelion: 2.347918212 AU (351.2435651 Gm)
- Perihelion: 0.81264205 AU (121.569520 Gm)
- Semi-major axis: 1.580280132 AU (236.4065429 Gm)
- Eccentricity: 0.4857608
- Orbital period (sidereal): 1.99 yr (725.60 d)
- Mean anomaly: 227.77555°
- Mean motion: 0° 29^{m} 46.099^{s} / day
- Inclination: 4.5134807°
- Longitude of ascending node: 299.70814°
- Argument of perihelion: 117.10906°
- Earth MOID: 0.00103632 AU (155,031 km)
- Jupiter MOID: 3.03959 AU (454.716 Gm)

Physical characteristics
- Dimensions: 300–600 m^{[a]}
- Absolute magnitude (H): 21.1

(85640) 1998 OX_{4} is a sub-kilometer asteroid, classified as a near-Earth object and potentially hazardous asteroid of the Apollo group.

== Description ==
It was discovered on 26 July 1998 by the Spacewatch program and subsequently lost. It was re-discovered by the Near-Earth Asteroid Tracking (NEAT) project on 31 August 2002, as 2002 PJ_{34}. It was removed from the Sentry Risk Table on 8 August 2002. It has a well determined orbit with an observation arc of more than 10 years. It is included in the Minor Planet Center list of Potentially Hazardous Asteroids (PHAs) as it comes to within 0.05 AU of Earth periodically. It is also a Mars crossing asteroid.

H < 22 asteroids passing less than 1 LD from Earth
Asteroid	Date	Nominal approach distance (LD)	Min. distance (LD)	Max. distance (LD)	Absolute magnitude (H)	Size (meters)
(152680) 1998 KJ9	1914-12-31	0.606	0.604	0.608	19.4	279–900
(458732) 2011 MD5	1918-09-17	0.911	0.909	0.913	17.9	556–1795
(163132) 2002 CU11	1925-08-30	0.903	0.901	0.905	18.5	443–477
2002 JE9	1971-04-11	0.616	0.587	0.651	21.2	122–393
2012 TY52	1981-11-04	0.818	0.813	0.823	21.4	111–358
2017 VW13	2001-11-08	0.454	0.318	3.436	20.7	153–494
(308635) 2005 YU55	2011-11-08	0.845	0.845	0.845	21.9	320–400
(153814) 2001 WN5	2028-06-26	0.647	0.647	0.647	18.2	921–943
99942 Apophis	2029-04-13	0.0981	0.0963	0.1000	19.7	310–340
2005 WY55	2065-05-28	0.865	0.856	0.874	20.7	153–494
(308635) 2005 YU_{55}	2075-11-08	0.592	0.499	0.752	21.9	320–400
(456938) 2007 YV56	2101-01-02	0.621	0.615	0.628	21.0	133–431
101955 Bennu	2135-09-25	0.780	0.308	1.406	20.19	472–512
(153201) 2000 WO107	2140-12-01	0.634	0.631	0.637	19.3	427–593
(85640) 1998 OX_{4}	2148-01-22	0.771	0.770	0.771	21.1	127–411
2011 LT17	2156-12-16	0.998	0.955	1.215	21.6	101–327

== See also ==
- 99942 Apophis

== Notes ==
- This is assuming an albedo of 0.25–0.05.

Preceded by (153201) 2000 WO107	Large NEO Earth close approach (inside the orbit of the Moon); 22 January 2148	Succeeded by 2011 LT_{17}
