= 2002 NY40 =

Near-Earth asteroid

2002 NY_{40}
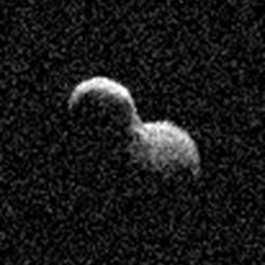
- Radar image of 2002 NY_{40} taken by the Arecibo Observatory in August 2002, revealing its contact binary shape

Discovery
- Discovered by: LINEAR
- Discovery site: Lincoln Laboratory ETS
- Discovery date: 14 July 2002 (first observed only)

Designations
- Minor planet category: NEO · Apollo · PHA

Orbital characteristics
- Epoch 21 November 2025 (JD 2461000.5)
- Uncertainty parameter 0
- Observation arc: 3.01 yr (1,099 d)
- Aphelion: 3.5019 AU
- Perihelion: 0.5985 AU
- Semi-major axis: 2.0502 AU
- Eccentricity: 0.7081
- Orbital period (sidereal): 2.94 yr (1,072 d)
- Mean anomaly: 317.21°
- Mean motion: 0° 20^{m} 8.52^{s} / day
- Inclination: 5.8940°
- Longitude of ascending node: 145.25°
- Argument of perihelion: 269.93°
- Earth MOID: 0.0012 AU (0.4670 LD)

Physical characteristics
- Mean diameter: 800 m
- Absolute magnitude (H): 19.0

2002 NY_{40} is a sub-kilometer near-Earth object and potentially hazardous asteroid of the Apollo group, approximately 800 meters (2,600 feet) in diameter. The contact binary with a bilobated, peanut-like shape was first observed on 14 July 2002 by the LINEAR automated system in New Mexico. On 18 August 2002, it passed Earth at a distance of 540,000 km. It was observed with adaptive optics by the Midcourse Space Experiment.

== Orbit and classification ==
It orbits the Sun at a distance of 0.6–3.5 AU once every 2 years and 11 months (1,073 days; semi-major axis of 2.05 AU). Its orbit has an eccentricity of 0.71 and an inclination of 6° with respect to the ecliptic.
