= (153201) 2000 WO107 =

Sub-kilometer asteroid

(153201) 2000 WO_{107}
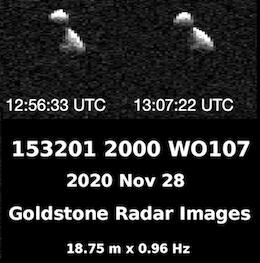
- Goldstone radar images showing the two lobes of contact binary 2000 WO_{107}.

Discovery
- Discovered by: LINEAR
- Discovery site: Lincoln Lab's ETS
- Discovery date: 29 November 2000

Designations
- Minor planet category: Aten · NEO · PHA

Orbital characteristics
- Epoch 2020-May-31 (JD 2459000.5)
- Uncertainty parameter 0
- Observation arc: 20.0 yr (7,304 days)
- Aphelion: 1.6231 AU
- Perihelion: 0.2000 AU
- Semi-major axis: 0.9115 AU
- Eccentricity: 0.7807
- Orbital period (sidereal): 0.87 yr (318 days)
- Mean anomaly: 206.45°
- Mean motion: 1° 7^{m} 57.72^{s} / day
- Inclination: 7.7703°
- Longitude of ascending node: 69.252°
- Time of perihelion: 13 October 2020
- Argument of perihelion: 213.72°
- Earth MOID: 0.0031 AU (460 thousand km; 1.2 LD)

Physical characteristics
- Mean diameter: 0.510±0.083 km
- Synodic rotation period: 4.8 hours
- Geometric albedo: 0.129±0.058
- Spectral type: SMASS = X
- Absolute magnitude (H): 19.3

(153201) 2000 WO_{107} is a sub-kilometer asteroid, classified as a near-Earth object and potentially hazardous asteroid of the Aten group with a very well determined orbit. It was discovered on 29 November 2000, by astronomers of the Lincoln Near-Earth Asteroid Research (LINEAR) at the Lincoln Laboratory's Experimental Test Site near Socorro, New Mexico, in the United States. It is a contact binary.

== Orbit ==
The orbit of this potentially hazardous asteroid (PHA) has been well-established with 20 years of observations. It orbits from inside the orbit of Mercury out to the orbit of Mars. It makes close approaches to all of the inner planets.

=== 2020 ===
The asteroid came to perihelion on 13 October 2020 when it passed the Sun going 88 kilometers per second (320,000 kilometers per hour). (Note: v = 42.1219 √1/r − 0.5/a, where r is the distance from the Sun, and a is the major semi-axis. Objects move fastest at perihelion and slowest at aphelion.) The asteroid was not more than 60 degrees from the Sun until 26 November 2020 and was observed by Goldstone radar on 27 November 2020. On 29 November 2020 the asteroid passed 0.02876 AU (4.302 million km; 11.19 LD) from Earth. Even the 2018 orbit solution had a known accuracy of roughly ±150 km for the close approach. With the radar observations the close approach distance is known with an accuracy of roughly ±5 km.

=== 2140 ===
This asteroid will pass 0.00162 AU (242 thousand km; 0.63 LD) from Earth on 1 December 2140. The 2140 close approach distance is known with an accuracy of roughly ±1000 km. For comparison, the distance to the Moon is about 0.0026 AU (384,400 km).

The Jupiter Tisserand invariant, used to distinguish different kinds of orbits, is 6.228.

History of close approaches of large near-Earth objects since 1908 ^{(A)}

PHA	Date	Approach distance in lunar distances			Abs. mag (H)	Diameter ^{(C)} (m)	Ref ^{(D)}
PHA	Date	Nominal^{(B)}	Minimum	Maximum	Abs. mag (H)	Diameter ^{(C)} (m)	Ref ^{(D)}
(152680) 1998 KJ9	1914-12-31	0.606	0.604	0.608	19.4	279–900	data
(458732) 2011 MD5	1918-09-17	0.911	0.909	0.913	17.9	556–1795	data
(163132) 2002 CU11	1925-08-30	0.903	0.901	0.905	18.5	443–477	data
69230 Hermes	1937-10-30	1.926	1.926	1.927	17.5	700-900	data
69230 Hermes	1942-04-26	1.651	1.651	1.651	17.5	700-900	data
2017 NM6	1959-07-12	1.89	1.846	1.934	18.8	580–1300	data
(27002) 1998 DV9	1975-01-31	1.762	1.761	1.762	18.1	507–1637	data
2002 NY40	2002-08-18	1.371	1.371	1.371	19.0	335–1082	data
(612901) 2004 XP1414	2006-07-03	1.125	1.125	1.125	19.3	292–942	data
2015 TB145	2015-10-31	1.266	1.266	1.266	20.0	620-690	data
(137108) 1999 AN10	2027-08-07	1.014	1.010	1.019	17.9	556–1793	data
(153814) 2001 WN5	2028-06-26	0.647	0.647	0.647	18.2	921–943	data
99942 Apophis	2029-04-13	0.0981	0.0963	0.1000	19.7	310–340	data
2017 MB1	2072-07-26	1.216	1.215	2.759	18.8	367–1186	data
2011 SM68	2072-10-17	1.875	1.865	1.886	19.6	254–820	data
(163132) 2002 CU_{11}	2080-08-31	1.655	1.654	1.656	18.5	443–477	data
(416801) 1998 MZ	2116-11-26	1.068	1.068	1.069	19.2	305–986	data
(153201) 2000 WO107	2140-12-01	0.634	0.631	0.637	19.3	427–593	data
(276033) 2002 AJ129	2172-02-08	1.783	1.775	1.792	18.7	385–1242	data
(290772) 2005 VC	2198-05-05	1.951	1.791	2.134	17.6	638–2061	data
^{(A)} This list includes near-Earth approaches of less than 2 lunar distances (LD) of objects with H brighter than 20.^{(B)} Nominal geocentric distance from the center of Earth to the center of the object (Earth has a radius of approximately 6,400 km).^{(C)} Diameter: estimated, theoretical mean-diameter based on H and albedo range between X and Y.^{(D)} Reference: data source from the JPL SBDB, with AU converted into LD (1 AU≈390 LD)^{(E)} Color codes: unobserved at close approach observed during close approach upcoming approaches

== Physical characteristics ==
In the SMASS classification, the object's spectral type is that of an X-type. According to the space-based survey by NASA's NEOWISE mission, the asteroid measures 510 meters in diameter and its surface has an albedo of 0.129.

== Numbering and naming ==
This minor planet was numbered by the Minor Planet Center on 2 April 2007. As of 2018, it has not been named.

== See also ==
- 2002 NY40
- 2014 HQ124
- (388188) 2006 DP14
- (53319) 1999 JM8

== Notes ==
Preceded by 2007 UW1	Large NEO Earth close approach (inside the orbit of the Moon); 1 December 2140	Succeeded by (85640) 1998 OX4
