= (163132) 2002 CU11 =

Near-earth asteroid

(163132) 2002 CU_{11}
Discovery
- Discovered by: LINEAR
- Discovery date: 7 February 2002

Designations
- Minor planet category: NEO · PHA · Apollo

Orbital characteristics
- Epoch 13 January 2016 (JD 2457400.5)
- Uncertainty parameter 0
- Observation arc: 4600 days (12.59 yr)
- Aphelion: 1.5795 AU (236.29 Gm)
- Perihelion: 0.85959 AU (128.593 Gm)
- Semi-major axis: 1.2196 AU (182.45 Gm)
- Eccentricity: 0.29517
- Orbital period (sidereal): 1.35 yr (491.94 d)
- Mean anomaly: 47.609°
- Mean motion: 0° 43^{m} 54.48^{s} / day (n)
- Inclination: 48.782°
- Longitude of ascending node: 157.77°
- Argument of perihelion: 110.54°
- Earth MOID: 0.00189035 AU (282,792 km)

Physical characteristics
- Mean diameter: 0.460±0.017 km 0.730 km (assumed)
- Mass: 5.3×10^{11} kg (assumed)
- Geometric albedo: 0.408±0.061
- Absolute magnitude (H): 18.5

(163132) 2002 CU_{11} is a bright, sub-kilometer asteroid, classified as a near-Earth object and potentially hazardous asteroid of the Apollo group. Based on absolute magnitude, it is the second largest asteroid known to have passed closer than the Moon.

== Description ==
2002 CU_{11} was discovered on 7 February 2002 by Lincoln Near-Earth Asteroid Research (LINEAR) at an apparent magnitude of 19 using a 1.0-meter (39 in) reflecting telescope. It has an estimated diameter of 730 meters (2,400 ft). The asteroid was listed on Sentry Risk Table with a Torino Scale rating of 1 on 20 March 2002.

With an observation arc of 44 days, (163132) 2002 CU_{11} showed a 1 in 9,300 chance of impacting Earth in 2049. It was removed from the Sentry Risk Table on 26 April 2002. It is now known that on 3 September 2049 the asteroid will be 0.0843 AU (12,610,000 km; 7,840,000 mi) from Earth.

Even though using an epoch of 27 June 2015 gives 2002 CU_{11} an Earth-MOID of 0.0000093 AU (1,390 km; 860 mi), the asteroid does not make any threatening approaches to Earth in the foreseeable future.

Notable close-approaches to Earth
Date	Distance from Earth
1925-08-30	0.0023 AU (340,000 km; 210,000 mi)
2014-08-30	0.0346 AU (5,180,000 km; 3,220,000 mi)
2049-09-03	0.0843 AU (12,610,000 km; 7,840,000 mi)
2080-08-31	0.0042 AU (630,000 km; 390,000 mi)

The close approach of 2080 will cause an uncertainty of 4 minutes for the close approach time of 2084.

History of close approaches of large near-Earth objects since 1908 ^{(A)}

PHA	Date	Approach distance in lunar distances			Abs. mag (H)	Diameter ^{(C)} (m)	Ref ^{(D)}
PHA	Date	Nominal^{(B)}	Minimum	Maximum	Abs. mag (H)	Diameter ^{(C)} (m)	Ref ^{(D)}
(152680) 1998 KJ9	1914-12-31	0.606	0.604	0.608	19.4	279–900	data
(458732) 2011 MD5	1918-09-17	0.911	0.909	0.913	17.9	556–1795	data
(163132) 2002 CU11	1925-08-30	0.903	0.901	0.905	18.5	443–477	data
69230 Hermes	1937-10-30	1.926	1.926	1.927	17.5	700-900	data
69230 Hermes	1942-04-26	1.651	1.651	1.651	17.5	700-900	data
2017 NM6	1959-07-12	1.89	1.846	1.934	18.8	580–1300	data
(27002) 1998 DV9	1975-01-31	1.762	1.761	1.762	18.1	507–1637	data
2002 NY40	2002-08-18	1.371	1.371	1.371	19.0	335–1082	data
(612901) 2004 XP1414	2006-07-03	1.125	1.125	1.125	19.3	292–942	data
2015 TB145	2015-10-31	1.266	1.266	1.266	20.0	620-690	data
(137108) 1999 AN10	2027-08-07	1.014	1.010	1.019	17.9	556–1793	data
(153814) 2001 WN5	2028-06-26	0.647	0.647	0.647	18.2	921–943	data
99942 Apophis	2029-04-13	0.0981	0.0963	0.1000	19.7	310–340	data
2017 MB1	2072-07-26	1.216	1.215	2.759	18.8	367–1186	data
2011 SM68	2072-10-17	1.875	1.865	1.886	19.6	254–820	data
(163132) 2002 CU_{11}	2080-08-31	1.655	1.654	1.656	18.5	443–477	data
(416801) 1998 MZ	2116-11-26	1.068	1.068	1.069	19.2	305–986	data
(153201) 2000 WO107	2140-12-01	0.634	0.631	0.637	19.3	427–593	data
(276033) 2002 AJ129	2172-02-08	1.783	1.775	1.792	18.7	385–1242	data
(290772) 2005 VC	2198-05-05	1.951	1.791	2.134	17.6	638–2061	data
^{(A)} This list includes near-Earth approaches of less than 2 lunar distances (LD) of objects with H brighter than 20.^{(B)} Nominal geocentric distance from the center of Earth to the center of the object (Earth has a radius of approximately 6,400 km).^{(C)} Diameter: estimated, theoretical mean-diameter based on H and albedo range between X and Y.^{(D)} Reference: data source from the JPL SBDB, with AU converted into LD (1 AU≈390 LD)^{(E)} Color codes: unobserved at close approach observed during close approach upcoming approaches

Preceded by (152680) 1998 KJ9	Large NEO Earth close approach (inside the orbit of the Moon); 30 August 1925	Succeeded by 2002 JE9
