= (152680) 1998 KJ9 =

Small near-Earth asteroid

(152680) 1998 KJ_{9}
Discovery
- Discovered by: LINEAR (704); 1.0-m Reflector
- Discovery site: Lincoln Lab's ETS
- Discovery date: 27 May 1998

Designations
- Minor planet category: NEO · PHA · Apollo

Orbital characteristics
- Epoch 13 January 2016 (JD 2457400.5)
- Uncertainty parameter 0
- Observation arc: 7706 days (21.10 yr)
- Aphelion: 2.3742 AU (355.18 Gm) (Q)
- Perihelion: 0.52125 AU (77.978 Gm) (q)
- Semi-major axis: 1.4477 AU (216.57 Gm) (a)
- Eccentricity: 0.63995 (e)
- Orbital period (sidereal): 1.74 yr (636.25 d)
- Mean anomaly: 6.2670° (M)
- Mean motion: 0° 33^{m} 56.952^{s} / day (n)
- Inclination: 10.932° (i)
- Longitude of ascending node: 98.675° (Ω)
- Argument of perihelion: 259.95° (ω)
- Earth MOID: 0.00552 AU (826,000 km)

Physical characteristics
- Dimensions: ~500 meters
- Mass: 7.87×10^{10} kg
- Absolute magnitude (H): 19.4

(152680) 1998 KJ_{9} is a sub-kilometer asteroid, classified as a near-Earth object and potentially hazardous asteroid of the Apollo group. Based on absolute magnitude, it is the third largest asteroid known to have passed closer than the Moon.

== Description ==
It was discovered on 27 May 1998, by astronomers of the Lincoln Near-Earth Asteroid Research (LINEAR) at Lincoln Laboratory's ETS near Socorro, New Mexico, at an apparent magnitude of 17.6 using a 1.0-meter (39 in) reflector. It was tracked through 9 June 1998. It was recovered on 28 December 2003 which extended the observation arc by 5 years. Two precovery images from January 1990 extended the observation arc by 8 years.

Based on an absolute magnitude of 19.4, the asteroid has an estimated diameter of about 500 metres (1,600 ft). (152680) 1998 KJ_{9} is noted for a close approach to the Earth on 31 December 1914 at a distance of 0.00155 AU (232,000 km; 144,000 mi). It is one of the largest objects known to have come inside the orbit of the moon. During the 1914 close approach the asteroid reached about apparent magnitude 7.7.

History of close approaches of large near-Earth objects since 1908 ^{(A)}

PHA	Date	Approach distance in lunar distances			Abs. mag (H)	Diameter ^{(C)} (m)	Ref ^{(D)}
PHA	Date	Nominal^{(B)}	Minimum	Maximum	Abs. mag (H)	Diameter ^{(C)} (m)	Ref ^{(D)}
(152680) 1998 KJ9	1914-12-31	0.606	0.604	0.608	19.4	279–900	data
(458732) 2011 MD5	1918-09-17	0.911	0.909	0.913	17.9	556–1795	data
(163132) 2002 CU11	1925-08-30	0.903	0.901	0.905	18.5	443–477	data
69230 Hermes	1937-10-30	1.926	1.926	1.927	17.5	700-900	data
69230 Hermes	1942-04-26	1.651	1.651	1.651	17.5	700-900	data
2017 NM6	1959-07-12	1.89	1.846	1.934	18.8	580–1300	data
(27002) 1998 DV9	1975-01-31	1.762	1.761	1.762	18.1	507–1637	data
2002 NY40	2002-08-18	1.371	1.371	1.371	19.0	335–1082	data
(612901) 2004 XP1414	2006-07-03	1.125	1.125	1.125	19.3	292–942	data
2015 TB145	2015-10-31	1.266	1.266	1.266	20.0	620-690	data
(137108) 1999 AN10	2027-08-07	1.014	1.010	1.019	17.9	556–1793	data
(153814) 2001 WN5	2028-06-26	0.647	0.647	0.647	18.2	921–943	data
99942 Apophis	2029-04-13	0.0981	0.0963	0.1000	19.7	310–340	data
2017 MB1	2072-07-26	1.216	1.215	2.759	18.8	367–1186	data
2011 SM68	2072-10-17	1.875	1.865	1.886	19.6	254–820	data
(163132) 2002 CU_{11}	2080-08-31	1.655	1.654	1.656	18.5	443–477	data
(416801) 1998 MZ	2116-11-26	1.068	1.068	1.069	19.2	305–986	data
(153201) 2000 WO107	2140-12-01	0.634	0.631	0.637	19.3	427–593	data
(276033) 2002 AJ129	2172-02-08	1.783	1.775	1.792	18.7	385–1242	data
(290772) 2005 VC	2198-05-05	1.951	1.791	2.134	17.6	638–2061	data
^{(A)} This list includes near-Earth approaches of less than 2 lunar distances (LD) of objects with H brighter than 20.^{(B)} Nominal geocentric distance from the center of Earth to the center of the object (Earth has a radius of approximately 6,400 km).^{(C)} Diameter: estimated, theoretical mean-diameter based on H and albedo range between X and Y.^{(D)} Reference: data source from the JPL SBDB, with AU converted into LD (1 AU≈390 LD)^{(E)} Color codes: unobserved at close approach observed during close approach upcoming approaches

Preceded by	Large NEO Earth close approach (inside the orbit of the Moon); 31 December 1914	Succeeded by (163132) 2002 CU11
