= 2015 XJ351 =

Potentially hazardous asteroid

Discovery
- Discovery date: 9 December 2015 (first reported obs.)

Designations
- Minor planet category: Apollo

Orbital characteristics
- Epoch 9 June 2026 (JD 2461200.5)
- Uncertainty parameter 1
- Observation arc: 2897 d (7.93 yr)
- Aphelion: 1.9487 AU
- Perihelion: 0.7793 AU
- Semi-major axis: 1.3640 AU
- Eccentricity: 0.4287
- Orbital period (sidereal): 1.5931 yr (581.881 d)
- Mean anomaly: 264.352°
- Mean motion: 0.6187° / d
- Inclination: 19.3657°
- Longitude of ascending node: 254.930°
- Argument of perihelion: 76.8280°
- Earth MOID: 0.0002413 AU

Physical characteristics
- Dimensions: 88–200 meters
- Absolute magnitude (H): 22.4

2015 XJ_{351} is a near-Earth asteroid with an estimated diameter of around 140 meters. It was discovered in 2015 when it passed 0.144 AU (21.5 million km; 56 LD) from Earth. The object is not risk-listed.

== June 2047 ==
With a short observation arc of 24 days, the Earth approach of June 2047 is poorly constrained and could be anywhere from 0.00056 AU (84 thousand km; 0.22 LD) to 0.097 AU (14.5 million km; 38 LD). The nominal 2047 Earth approach is 0.01 AU (1.5 million km; 3.9 LD) ±4 days.

== See also ==
- 2008 VL14
