= (153814) 2001 WN5 =

Potentially hazardous near-Earth asteroid

(153814) 2001 WN_{5}
Discovery
- Discovered by: LONEOS
- Discovery site: Anderson Mesa Stn.
- Discovery date: 20 November 2001

Designations
- Minor planet category: NEO; PHA; Apollo

Orbital characteristics
- Epoch 26 November 2017 (JD 2458083.5)
- Uncertainty parameter 0
- Observation arc: 21.88 yr (7,990 days)
- Aphelion: 2.5114 AU
- Perihelion: 0.9125 AU
- Semi-major axis: 1.7119 AU
- Eccentricity: 0.4670
- Orbital period (sidereal): 2.24 yr (818 days)
- Mean anomaly: 46.227°
- Mean motion: 0° 26^{m} 24^{s} / day
- Inclination: 1.9197°
- Longitude of ascending node: 277.51°
- Argument of perihelion: 44.569°
- Earth MOID: 0.0015 AU (0.6 LD)

Physical characteristics
- Mean diameter: 0.932±0.011 km
- Geometric albedo: 0.097±0.016
- Absolute magnitude (H): 18.3

(153814) 2001 WN_{5} is a sub-kilometer asteroid, classified as a near-Earth object and potentially hazardous asteroid of the Apollo group.

2028 Earth/Moon approach
Date & Time	Approach to	Nominal distance	uncertainty region (3-sigma)
2028-Jun-26 05:22	Earth	248694 km	± 24 km
2028-Jun-26 07:43	Moon	502854 km	± 26 km

== Description ==
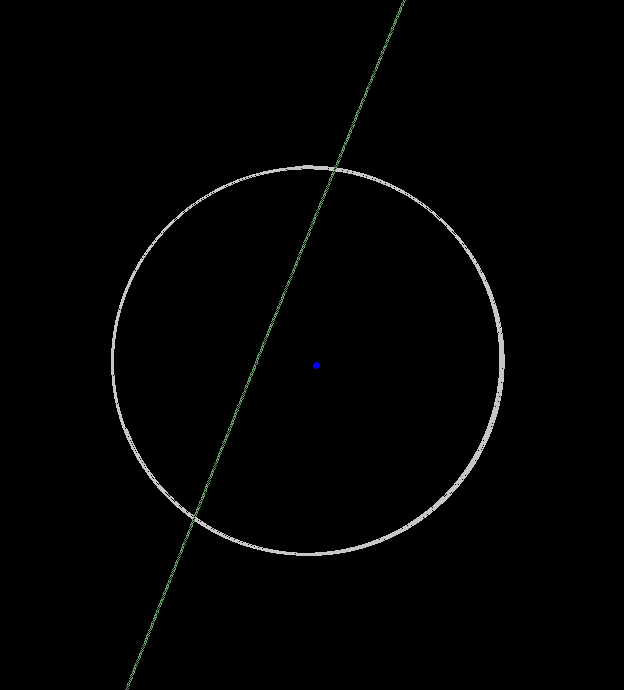
Nominal orbit of 2001 WN_{5} (green line) passing the Earth–Moon system in June 2028

It was discovered by the Lowell Observatory Near-Earth-Object Search at Anderson Mesa Station on 20 November 2001, The potentially hazardous asteroid was removed from the Sentry Risk Table on 30 January 2002.

There are precovery images dating back to 10 February 1996. The orbit is well determined with an observation arc of 14.9 years which includes two radar delay observations. It has an Uncertainty Parameter of 0.

The asteroid will pass 248,700 km (0.647 LD) from the Earth on 26 June 2028. During the close approach, the asteroid should peak at about apparent magnitude 6.7, and will be visible in binoculars. It has an absolute magnitude (H) of 18.2.

According to observations by the NEOWISE mission, the asteroid measures approximately 0.9 km in diameter and its surface has a rather low albedo of 0.097.

History of close approaches of large near-Earth objects since 1908 ^{(A)}

PHA	Date	Approach distance in lunar distances			Abs. mag (H)	Diameter ^{(C)} (m)	Ref ^{(D)}
PHA	Date	Nominal^{(B)}	Minimum	Maximum	Abs. mag (H)	Diameter ^{(C)} (m)	Ref ^{(D)}
(152680) 1998 KJ9	1914-12-31	0.606	0.604	0.608	19.4	279–900	data
(458732) 2011 MD5	1918-09-17	0.911	0.909	0.913	17.9	556–1795	data
(163132) 2002 CU11	1925-08-30	0.903	0.901	0.905	18.5	443–477	data
69230 Hermes	1937-10-30	1.926	1.926	1.927	17.5	700-900	data
69230 Hermes	1942-04-26	1.651	1.651	1.651	17.5	700-900	data
2017 NM6	1959-07-12	1.89	1.846	1.934	18.8	580–1300	data
(27002) 1998 DV9	1975-01-31	1.762	1.761	1.762	18.1	507–1637	data
2002 NY40	2002-08-18	1.371	1.371	1.371	19.0	335–1082	data
(612901) 2004 XP1414	2006-07-03	1.125	1.125	1.125	19.3	292–942	data
2015 TB145	2015-10-31	1.266	1.266	1.266	20.0	620-690	data
(137108) 1999 AN10	2027-08-07	1.014	1.010	1.019	17.9	556–1793	data
(153814) 2001 WN5	2028-06-26	0.647	0.647	0.647	18.2	921–943	data
99942 Apophis	2029-04-13	0.0981	0.0963	0.1000	19.7	310–340	data
2017 MB1	2072-07-26	1.216	1.215	2.759	18.8	367–1186	data
2011 SM68	2072-10-17	1.875	1.865	1.886	19.6	254–820	data
(163132) 2002 CU_{11}	2080-08-31	1.655	1.654	1.656	18.5	443–477	data
(416801) 1998 MZ	2116-11-26	1.068	1.068	1.069	19.2	305–986	data
(153201) 2000 WO107	2140-12-01	0.634	0.631	0.637	19.3	427–593	data
(276033) 2002 AJ129	2172-02-08	1.783	1.775	1.792	18.7	385–1242	data
(290772) 2005 VC	2198-05-05	1.951	1.791	2.134	17.6	638–2061	data
^{(A)} This list includes near-Earth approaches of less than 2 lunar distances (LD) of objects with H brighter than 20.^{(B)} Nominal geocentric distance from the center of Earth to the center of the object (Earth has a radius of approximately 6,400 km).^{(C)} Diameter: estimated, theoretical mean-diameter based on H and albedo range between X and Y.^{(D)} Reference: data source from the JPL SBDB, with AU converted into LD (1 AU≈390 LD)^{(E)} Color codes: unobserved at close approach observed during close approach upcoming approaches

Preceded by 367943 Duende (2012 DA_{14})	Large NEO Earth close approach (inside the orbit of the Moon); 26 June 2028	Succeeded by 99942 Apophis
