= (458732) 2011 MD5 =

Apollo near-Earth asteroid

(458732) 2011 MD_{5}
Discovery
- Discovered by: Pan-STARRS 1
- Discovery site: Haleakala Obs.
- Discovery date: 30 June 2011

Designations
- Minor planet category: NEO; Apollo

Orbital characteristics
- Epoch 31 May 2020 (JD 2459000.5)
- Uncertainty parameter 0
- Observation arc: 8.67 yr (3,165 d)
- Aphelion: 3.9869 AU
- Perihelion: 0.9895 AU
- Semi-major axis: 2.4882 AU
- Eccentricity: 0.6023
- Orbital period (sidereal): 3.92 yr (1,434 d)
- Mean anomaly: 49.188°
- Mean motion: 0° 15^{m} 3.96^{s} / day
- Inclination: 10.553°
- Longitude of ascending node: 170.34°
- Argument of perihelion: 224.84°
- Earth MOID: 0.0627 AU (24.4 LD)

Physical characteristics
- Mean diameter: 730–1,600 m (CNEOS); 0.8 km 1.2 km
- Absolute magnitude (H): 17.8; 17.9

(458732) 2011 MD_{5} is an Apollo near-Earth asteroid around 1.2 kilometers (0.75 miles) in diameter. It is the largest asteroid known to have passed closer than the Moon. On 17 September 1918 the asteroid passed 0.00234 AU (350,000 km; 0.91 LD) from Earth with a peak apparent magnitude of around 8.4. The 1918 close approach distance is known with an accuracy of roughly ±120 km. The asteroid had come to opposition (opposite the Sun in the sky) on 9 August 1918 at magnitude 16.

2011 MD_{5} was not discovered until 30 June 2011, when the asteroid was 1.3 AU (190 million km) from Earth. As of 2023, the asteroid has a 12-year observation arc and a well-determined orbit.
