= List of asteroid close approaches to Earth =

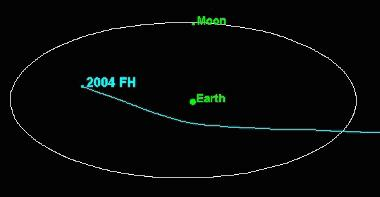
Trajectory of 2004 FH in the Earth–Moon system

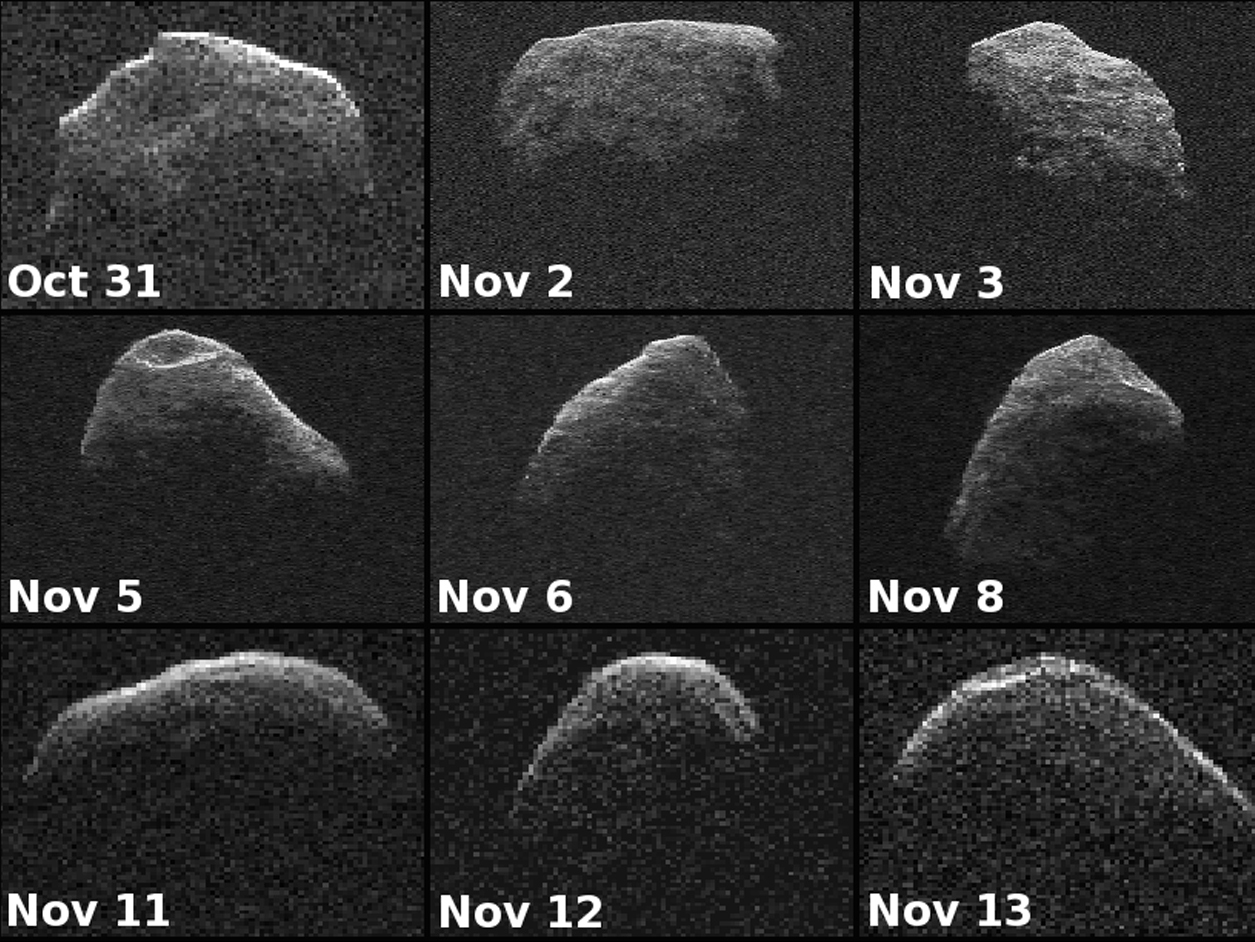
Goldstone radar images of asteroid 2007 PA8's Earth flyby in 2012

This is a list of examples where an asteroid or meteoroid travels close to the Earth. Some of these objects are regarded as potentially hazardous objects if they are estimated to be large enough to cause regional devastation. This list also gives an overview of more detailed lists dedicated to specific years, such as List of asteroid close approaches to Earth in 2025.

Near-Earth object detection technology began to improve around 1998, so objects being detected as of 2004 could have been missed only a decade earlier due to a lack of dedicated near-Earth astronomical surveys. As sky surveys improve, smaller and smaller asteroids are regularly being discovered. As smaller asteroids are more numerous, ever more close approaches are detected within a given distance. In 2014, scientists estimated that several dozen asteroids in the 6–12 m (20–39 ft) size range fly by Earth at a distance closer than the Moon every year, but only a fraction of these are actually detected.

== Definitions ==
The lists below are based on the close approach database of the Center for Near-Earth Object Studies (CNEOS), in its state as of 27 February 2025. The database lists any approaches with a minimum distance less than 0.2 astronomical units (AU) from 1900 and until a century into the future which have been derived by orbit calculations. This includes some close approaches a full orbit or more before or after the object has been observed.

The distance calculated for an approach has an uncertainty, the magnitude of which depends on the amount, length in time and quality of observations used, the extrapolation time from the observations, and perturbations by other objects along the predicted orbit. The uncertainty is usually characterised by the 3-sigma uncertainty region, which is the nominal close approach distance plus or minus three times the standard deviation, and includes 99.7% of the probability distribution. For predicted close approaches in the future, if Earth is near the uncertainty region or intersects it, an impact risk is calculated. Confirmed impacts, however, aren't considered close approaches and are excluded from the CNEOS close approach database. Asteroids whose detection in space led to predicted impacts on Earth are listed separately, as are the hundreds of other objects that collided with Earth's atmosphere which were not discovered in advance but were observed visually or recorded by sensors designed to detect detonation of nuclear devices. The CNEOS list also does not include Earth-grazers, objects that enter Earth's atmosphere at a very shallow angle and leave it again without burning up completely, but they are listed separately below. Although Earth's atmosphere thins out continuously with distance from Earth's surface, the nominal limit of space is the Kármán line, which is 100 km (62 mi) above sea level.

== Timeline of closest approaches ever observed ==
The list below shows all approaches by potentially hazardous objects (objects which can approach Earth within 0.05 AU) without atmospheric contact which have been the closest ever observed at some point in time, from the discovery of the first such object to the record holder, as of December 2025.

Date of closest approach	Nominal geocentric distance			Object	Size (m) (approximate)	Abs. mag.	Ref
Date of closest approach	(km)	(LD)	(AU)	Object	Size (m) (approximate)	Abs. mag.	Ref
1932-05-15	11,220,000	29.189	0.075003	1862 Apollo	1500	16.1	JPL · CAD
1936-02-07	2,217,500	5.769	0.014823	2101 Adonis	600	18.7	JPL · CAD
1937-10-30	740,600	1.927	0.004951	69230 Hermes	770–1700; 810	17.7	JPL · CAD
1989-03-22	684,000	1.779	0.004572	4581 Asclepius	190–420	20.7	JPL · CAD
	384,399	1.000	0.002570	average distance to the Moon			
1991-01-18	149,200	0.438	0.001124	1991 BA	5.1–11	28.6	JPL · CAD
1993-05-20	149,200	0.438	0.001124	1993 KA_{2}	4.2–9.4	29.0	JPL · CAD
1994-12-09	105,300	0.388	0.000997	1994 XM_{1}	6.1–14	28.2	JPL · CAD
2003-09-27	84,200	0.274	0.000704	2003 SQ_{222}	2.5–5.7	30.1	JPL · CAD
2004-03-18	49,100	0.219	0.000563	2004 FH	14–31	26.4	JPL · CAD
	42,164	0.110	0.0002827	geosynchronous orbit			
2004-03-31	12,900	0.0336	0.0000863	2004 FU162	3.4–7.6	29.5	JPL · CAD
2008-10-09	12,540	0.0329	0.0000845	2008 TS26	0.61–1.4	33.2	JPL · CAD
2011-02-04	11,852	0.0308	0.0000792	2011 CQ1	1.0–2.3	32.1	JPL · CAD
2020-08-16	9,317	0.0242	0.0000623	2020 QG	2.8–6.2	29.9	JPL · CAD
2025-10-01	6,780	0.0180	0.0000453	2025 TF	1.2–2.7	31.7	JPL · CAD
2020-11-13	6,746	0.0175	0.0000451	2020 VT4	5.0–11	28.6	JPL · CAD
2025-10-30	6,599	0.0172	0.0000441	2025 UC11	0.41–0.93	34.06	JPL · CAD
	6,478	0.01685	0.0000433	Kármán line (nominal limit of the atmosphere) above the equator			
	6,378	0.01659	0.0000426	equatorial radius of the Earth			

== Close approaches within one lunar distance ==
The average distance to the Moon (or lunar distance (LD)) is 384,399 km (238,854 mi), which is around 30 times the diameter of the Earth. The lists in this section are of close approaches in less than one LD.

=== Time of discovery ===
The bar graphs below show the time of discovery relative to the time of the closest approach for each year. The asteroids are listed in separate list articles for each year. The statistics below only include close approaches that are evidenced by observations, thus the pre-discovery close approaches are only included if the object was found by precovery.

Year(s)	Approaches	Total
2000-2007	2 22 6 23	53
2008	8 1 11	20
2009	11 1 7	19
2010	12 11	23
2011	2 10 1 19	32
2012	1 2 13 1 6	23
2013	1 9 2 12	24
2014	1 8 4 18	31
2015	1 6 3 17	27
2016	16 5 31	52
2017	1 1 24 6 23	55
2018	2 26 6 43	77
2019	4 20 10 47	81
2020	2 26 18 66	112
2021	1 54 33 70	158
2022	1 36 26 80	143
2023	1 2 37 13 62	115
2024	4 58 18 65	145
2025	2 57 36 94	189
Discovered > 1 year in advance Discovered > 7 weeks in advance Discovered > 1 week in advance Discovered up to 1 week in advance < 24 hours' warning < no warning

=== Closest per year ===
Satellites in geostationary orbit

From the annual lists summarized in the preceding section, these are the closest known asteroids per year that approach Earth within one lunar distance. More than one asteroid per year may be listed if its geocentric distance (Note: Distance from the center of Earth to the center of the object. See the NASA/JPL Solar System Dynamics Glossary: Geocentric. Earth has a radius of approximately 6,400 km.)

The CNEOS database of close approaches lists some close approaches a full orbit or more before or after the discovery of the object, derived by orbit calculation. Until 2001 and in future years, all of these close approaches are included in the list below, but from the start of regular discoveries each year in 2001 until the current year, the list is limited to close approaches that are evidenced by observations, thus any of these pre-discovery close approaches are only included if the object was found by precovery.

Rows highlighted red indicate objects which were not discovered until after closest approach

Rows highlighted yellow indicate objects discovered less than 24 hours before closest approach

Rows left white indicate objects discovered 1–7 days before closest approach

Rows highlighted green indicate objects discovered more than one week before closest approach

Rows highlighted blue indicate objects discovered more than one year before closest approach, i.e. objects successfully cataloged on a previous orbit, rather than being detected during final approach.

Year	Date of closest approach	Date discovered	Object	Nominal geocentric distance (in 000's km)	Nominal geocentric distance (in LD)	Size of object (in meters)	(H)	Ref
2095	2095-09-06	2010-09-05	2010 RF12	51.9	0.135	5.5–12	28.4	JPL · CAD
2032	2032-08-14	2008-02-18	2008 DB	127.4	0.332	18–41	25.8	JPL · CAD
2029	2029-04-13	2004-06-19	99942 Apophis	38.0	0.096	340 ±40	19.1	JPL · CAD
2028	2028-06-26	2001-11-20	(153814) 2001 WN5	248.7	0.647	932 ±11	18.3	JPL · CAD
2025	2025-10-30	2025-10-30	2025 UC11	6.6	0.017	0.41–0.93	34.06	JPL · CAD
2024	2024-12-01	2024-12-01	2024 XA	7.7	0.020	1.2–2.8	31.6	JPL · CAD
2023	2023-01-27	2023-01-21	2023 BU	10.0	0.026	3.1–6.9	29.7	JPL · CAD
2022	2022-03-25	2022-03-24	2022 FD1	14.8	0.039	1.6–3.7	31.1	JPL · CAD
2021	2021-10-25	2021-10-25	2021 UA1	9.4	0.025	1.1–2.5	31.8	JPL · CAD
2020	2020-11-13	2020-11-14	2020 VT4	6.7	0.018	5.0–11	28.6	JPL · CAD
2019	2019-10-31	2019-10-31	2019 UN13	12.6	0.033	1.1–2.4	32.0	JPL · CAD
2018	2018-10-19	2018-10-19	2018 UA	13.7	0.036	2.4–5.4	30.2	JPL · CAD
2017	2017-04-04	2017-04-03	2017 GM	16.3	0.042	2.8–6.2	29.9	JPL · CAD
2016	2016-02-25	2016-02-26	2016 DY_{30}	14.3	0.037	2.1–4.7	30.5	JPL · CAD
2015	2015-09-22	2015-09-24	2015 SK_{7}	26.6	0.069	4.4–9.9	28.9	JPL · CAD
2014	2014-06-03	2014-06-02	2014 LY21	20.0	0.052	4.0–9.0	29.1	JPL · CAD
2013	2013-12-23	2013-12-23	2013 YB	27.3	0.071	1.4–3.1	31.4	JPL · CAD
2013	2013-02-15	2012-02-23	367943 Duende*	34.1	0.089	39–86	24.2	JPL · CAD
2012	2012-05-29	2012-05-28	2012 KT42	20.8	0.054	4.2–9.4	29.0	JPL · CAD
2011	2011-02-04	2011-02-04	2011 CQ1	11.9	0.031	1.0–2.3	32.1	JPL · CAD
2010	2010-11-17	2010-11-16	2010 WA	38.9	0.101	2.7–5.9	30.0	JPL · CAD
2009	2009-11-06	2009-11-06	2009 VA	20.5	0.053	5.1–11	28.6	JPL · CAD
2008	2008-10-09	2008-10-09	2008 TS_{26}	12.6	0.033	0.6-1.4	33.2	JPL · CAD
2007	2007-10-17	2007-10-21	2007 UN_{12}	69.7	0.181	4.8–11	28.7	JPL · CAD
2006	2006-02-23	2006-02-22	2006 DD_{1}	117.5	0.306	13–30	26.5	JPL · CAD
2005	2005-11-26	2005-11-25	2005 WN_{3}	83.8	0.218	2.8–6.2	29.9	JPL · CAD
2004	2004-03-31	2004-03-31	2004 FU162	12.9	0.034	3.4–7.6	29.5	JPL · CAD
2003	2003-09-27	2003-09-28	2003 SQ_{222}	84.2	0.22	2.5–5.7	30.1	JPL · CAD
2002	2002-12-11	2002-12-13	2002 XV_{90}	117.7	0.31	23–52	25.3	JPL · CAD
2001	2001-11-08 (undetected)	2017	2017 VW_{13}	120.2	0.31	200–440	20.6	JPL · CAD
2001	2001-01-15	2001-01-19	2001 BA_{16}	306.2	0.80	17–38	26.0	JPL · CAD
1999	1999-03-12 (undetected)	2013	2013 EC_{20}	313.3	0.82	4.2–9.4	29.0	JPL · CAD
1994	1994-12-09	1994-12-09	1994 XM_{1}	105.3	0.27	6.1–14	28.2	JPL · CAD
1993	1993-05-20	1993-05-21	1993 KA_{2}	149.2	0.39	4.2–9.4	29.0	JPL · CAD
1992	1992-09-12 (undetected)	2024	2024 RC_{42}	62.6	0.16	0.89–2.0	32.4	JPL · CAD
1991	1991-01-18	1991-01-18	1991 BA	168.2	0.44	5.1–11	28.6	JPL · CAD
1990	1990-09-19 (undetected)	2003	2003 SW_{130}	205.9	0.54	4.0–9.0	29.1	JPL · CAD
1988	1988-10-15 (undetected)	2010	2010 UK	367.3	0.96	12–26	26.8	JPL · CAD
1987	1987-08-25 (undetected)	2024	2024 RV_{30}	384.3	1.00	9.0–20	27.4	JPL · CAD
1985	1985-11-01 (undetected)	2019	2019 VC_{37}	253.7	0.66	3.1–6.9	29.7	JPL · CAD
1984	1984-01-10 (undetected)	2016	2016 TB_{57}	294.8	0.77	16–36	26.1	JPL · CAD
1982	1982-11-04 (undetected)	2012	2012 TY_{52}	314.3	0.82	150–330	21.3	JPL · CAD
1980	1980-10-15 (undetected)	2018	2018 RY_{1}	173.3	0.45	32–71	24.6	JPL · CAD
1979	1979-09-02 (undetected)	2014	2014 WX_{202}	334.6	0.87	3.2–7.1	29.6	JPL · CAD
1977	1977-09-05 (undetected)	2022	2022 QX_{4}	128.7	0.33	31–68	24.7	JPL · CAD
1976	1976-10-17 (undetected)	2013	2013 UG_{1}	328.2	0.85	81–180	22.6	JPL · CAD
1975	1975-07-01 (undetected)	2021	2021 LD_{6}	117.9	0.31	9.7–22	27.2	JPL · CAD
1972	1972-03-17 (undetected)	2021	2021 RP_{2}	91.7	0.24	2.3–5.2	30.3	JPL · CAD
1971	1971-03-19 (undetected)	2024	2024 EN	135.5	0.35	34–77	24.4	JPL · CAD
1970	1970-02-26 (undetected)	2019	2019 DS_{1}	361.3	0.94	20–45	25.6	JPL · CAD
1968	1968-04-23 (undetected)	2008	2008 GD_{110}	91.7	0.24	33–75	24.5	JPL · CAD
1965	1965-10-27 (undetected)	2005	2005 VL_{1}	340.9	0.89	14–30	26.4	JPL · CAD
1964	1964-11-07 (undetected)	2023	2023 VW	253.6	0.66	6.7–15	28.0	JPL · CAD
1961	1961-05-31 (undetected)	2022	2022 KW_{4}	353.4	0.92	6.1–14	28.2	JPL · CAD
1960	1960-10-24 (undetected)	2004	2004 UH_{1}	184.1	0.48	6.4–14	28.1	JPL · CAD
1959	1959-01-27 (undetected)	2012	2012 BX34	204.2	0.53	8.0–18	27.6	JPL · CAD
1958	1958-10-29 (undetected)	2024	2024 UO_{5}	182.8	0.48	3.5–7.9	29.4	JPL · CAD
1957	1957-12-10 (undetected)	2010	2010 XW_{58}	60.8	0.16	28–62	24.9	JPL · CAD
1955	1955-06-19 (undetected)	2015	2015 LR_{21}	226.7	0.59	13–28	26.6	JPL · CAD
1954	1954-03-13 (undetected)	2013	2013 RZ_{53}	103.5	0.27	1.6–3.6	31.1	JPL · CAD
1953	1953-04-10 (undetected)	2019	2019 GK_{21}	202.6	0.53	19–43	31.1	JPL · CAD
1952	1952-10-23 (undetected)	2009	2009 UU_{1}	260.1	0.68	31–68	31.1	JPL · CAD
1949	1949-01-01 (undetected)	2003	2003 YS_{70}	258.6	0.67	4.0–9.0	29.1	JPL · CAD
1948	1948-01-24 (undetected)	2017	2017 BX	378.8	0.99	6.7–15	28.0	JPL · CAD
1944	1944-08-12 (undetected)	2022	2022 BY_{39}	227.7	0.59	2.7–6.1	29.9	JPL · CAD
1942	1942-09-11 (undetected)	2023	2023 FY_{3}	330.3	0.86	4.2–9.3	29.0	JPL · CAD
1941	1941-01-10 (undetected)	2014	2014 AW_{32}	141.3	0.37	8.4–19	27.5	JPL · CAD
1940	1940-09-16 (undetected)	2007	2007 RJ_{1}	251.1	0.65	24–54	25.2	JPL · CAD
1938	1938-11-14 (undetected)	2023	2023 VV_{1}	82.2	0.27	4.3–9.7	28.9	JPL · CAD
1936	1936-01-06 (undetected)	2010	2010 VB_{1}	212.6	0.55	58–130	23.3	JPL · CAD
1935	1935-03-08 (undetected)	2015	2015 DD_{54}	184.1	0.48	22–49	25.4	JPL · CAD
1933	1933-10-22 (undetected)	2015	2015 UM_{52}	253.2	0.66	7.3–16	27.8	JPL · CAD
1931	1931-10-01 (undetected)	2022	2022 SU_{7}	334.3	0.87	5.8–13	28.3	JPL · CAD
1928	1928-03-20 (undetected)	2024	2024 HC	179.6	0.47	8.6–19	27.4	JPL · CAD
1926	1926-02-06 (undetected)	2023	2023 CN_{1}	149.6	0.39	15–34	26.2	JPL · CAD
1925	1925-03-29 (undetected)	2002	(163132) 2002 CU11	39.3	0.10	460 ±17	18.6	JPL · CAD
1923	1923-06-26 (undetected)	2021	2021 MK_{1}	368.9	0.96	140–320	27.5	JPL · CAD
1922	1922-06-07 (undetected)	2017	2017 LD	51.8	0.13	8.4–19	27.5	JPL · CAD
1920	1920-06-21 (undetected)	2023	2023 VC_{7}	271.0	0.71	18–40	27.5	JPL · CAD
1919	1919-04-02 (undetected)	2024	2024 FQ_{5}	112.2	0.29	1.7–3.8	31.0	JPL · CAD
1918	1918-09-17 (undetected)	2011	(458732) 2011 MD5	350.0	0.91	730–1600	17.8	JPL · CAD
1914	1914-12-31 (undetected)	1998	(152680) 1998 KJ9	233.2	0.61	330–740	19.4	JPL · CAD
1910	1910-05-09 (undetected)	2007	2007 JB_{21}	174.9	0.45	22–49	25.4	JPL · CAD

*367943 Duende is listed for 2013 although it was only the second-closest that year for notability: it is the largest asteroid that was observed while it approached within the radius of the geostationary orbit, it was also predicted nearly a year in advance, and coincidentally approached just a few hours after the unrelated Chelyabinsk meteor, which was unpredicted, but injured thousands of people when it impacted.

=== Largest per year ===
Trajectory of the relatively large 2005 YU55 compared with the orbits of Earth and the Moon on 8–9 Nov 2011

From the lists in the first section, these are the largest known asteroids per year that approach Earth within one LD. (More than one asteroid per year may be listed if its size is 100 m [330 ft] or more.) For comparison, the 1908 Tunguska event was caused by an object about 60–190 m (200–620 ft) in size, while the 2013 Chelyabinsk meteor, which injured thousands of people and damaged buildings when it generated a large airburst over Russia, was estimated to be just 20 m (66 ft) across.

The CNEOS database of close approaches lists some close approaches a full orbit or more before or after the discovery of the object, derived by orbit calculation. For years when the largest of the objects that had an undetected close approach within 1 LD was larger than the largest of the objects that were detected in real time or in precovery, both objects are listed. If there were only undetected close approaches in a year, only objects larger than 25 m [82 ft] (or H ≤ 25.75) are shown.

Year	Date of closest approach	Object	Nominal geocentric distance (in 000s km)	Nominal geocentric distance (in LD)	Est. size (in m)	(H)	Ref
2029	2029-04-13	99942 Apophis	38.0	0.099	300–380	19.1	JPL · CAD
2028	2028-06-26	(153814) 2001 WN5	248.7	0.647	921–943	18.3	JPL · CAD
2025	2025-02-04	2025 BB_{2}	291.5	0.758	20–44	25.6	JPL · CAD
2024	2024-06-29	2024 MK	295.4	0.769	100–230	22.0	JPL · CAD
2023	2023-03-25	2023 DZ2	174.6	0.454	37–83	24.3	JPL · CAD
2022	2022-07-10	2022 NR	384.0	0.999	18–40	25.9	JPL · CAD
2021	2021-09-16	2021 SG	245.0	0.637	42–94	24.0	JPL · CAD
2020	2020-07-25	2020 LD	306.4	0.797	89–200	22.4	JPL · CAD
2019	2019-07-25	2019 OK	71.4	0.191	58–130	23.3	JPL · CAD
2018	2018-01-03	2018 AH	297.0	0.772	77–170	22.7	JPL · CAD
2017	2017-07-21	2017 QP1	62.6	0.163	37–83	24.3	JPL · CAD
2016	2016-03-21	2016 QA_{2}	86.6	0.225	25–57	25.1	JPL · CAD
2015	2015-01-18	2015 KW_{121}	285.8	0.743	16–36	26.1	JPL · CAD
2014	2014-03-30	2014 GY_{44}	167.7	0.436	22–49	25.4	JPL · CAD
2013	2013-01-15	367943 Duende	34.1	0.089	39–86	24.2	JPL · CAD
2012	2012-04-01	2012 EG5	230.4	0.599	37–82	24.3	JPL · CAD
2011	2011-11-08	(308635) 2005 YU55	324.9	0.845	400	21.9	JPL · CAD
2010	2010-11-02	2010 UJ_{7}	286.4	0.745	22–49	25.4	JPL · CAD
2009	2009-03-02	2009 DD45	72.2	0.188	18–41	25.8	JPL · CAD
2008	2008-02-15	2008 CK70	371.2	0.97	28–62	24.9	JPL · CAD
2007	2007-01-18	2007 BD	324.1	0.84	22–49	25.4	JPL · CAD
2006	2006-02-23	2006 DD_{1}	117.5	0.31	13–30	26.5	JPL · CAD
2005	2005-12-05	2005 XA_{8}	217.2	0.57	19–43	25.7	JPL · CAD
2004	2001-04-18 (undetected)	2023 DZ_{2}	120.2	0.31	37–83	24.3	JPL · CAD
2004	2004-03-18	2004 FY_{15}	238.7	0.62	16–36	26.1	JPL · CAD
2003	2003-12-06	2003 XJ_{7}	148.2	0.39	14–31	26.4	JPL · CAD
2002	2002-06-14	2002 MN	120.0	0.31	48–110	23.7	JPL · CAD
2001	2001-11-08 (undetected)	2017 VW_{13}	120.2	0.31	200–440	20.6	JPL · CAD
2001	2001-01-15	2001 BA_{16}	306.2	0.80	17–38	26.0	JPL · CAD
1994	1994-12-09	1994 XM_{1}	105.3	0.27	6.1–14	28.2	JPL · CAD
1993	1993-05-20	1993 KA_{2}	149.2	0.39	4.2–9.4	29.0	JPL · CAD
1991	1991-04-08 (undetected)	2012 UE34	329.7	0.86	58–130	23.3	JPL · CAD
1991	1991-01-18	1991 BA	168.2	0.44	5.1–11	28.6	JPL · CAD
1982	1982-11-04 (undetected)	2012 TY_{52}	314.3	0.82	150-330	21.3	JPL · CAD
1980	1980-10-15 (undetected)	2018 RY_{1}	173.3	0.45	32-71	24.6	JPL · CAD
1977	1977-09-05 (undetected)	2022 QX_{4}	128.7	0.33	31–68	24.7	JPL · CAD
1976	1976-10-17 (undetected)	2013 UG_{1}	328.1	0.85	81–180	22.6	JPL · CAD
1971	1971-04-11 (undetected)	(612358) 2002 JE9	263.6	0.69	140–310	21.4	JPL · CAD
1970	1970-02-26 (undetected)	2019 DS_{1}	361.3	0.94	20–45	25.6	JPL · CAD
1968	1968-04-23 (undetected)	2008 GD_{110}	91.7	0.24	33–75	24.5	JPL · CAD
1957	1957-02-02 (undetected)	2019 CD_{2}	75.3	0.20	260–590	20.0	JPL · CAD
1953	1953-04-10 (undetected)	2019 GK_{21}	202.6	0.53	19–43	25.7	JPL · CAD
1952	1952-10-23 (undetected)	2009 UU_{1}	260.1	0.68	31–68	24.7	JPL · CAD
1940	1940-09-16 (undetected)	2007 RJ_{1}	251.1	0.65	24–54	25.2	JPL · CAD
1936	1936-01-06 (undetected)	2010 VB_{1}	212.6	0.55	58–130	23.3	JPL · CAD
1935	1935-03-08 (undetected)	2015 DD_{54}	184.1	0.48	22–49	25.4	JPL · CAD
1925	1925-08-30 (undetected)	(163132) 2002 CU11	347.0	0.90	443–467	18.6	JPL · CAD
1923	1923-06-26 (undetected)	2021 MK_{1}	368.9	0.96	140–320	27.5	JPL · CAD
1920	1920-06-21 (undetected)	2023 VC_{7}	271.0	0.71	18–40	27.5	JPL · CAD
1918	1918-09-17 (undetected)	(458732) 2011 MD5	350.0	0.91	730–1600	17.8	JPL · CAD
1914	1914-12-31 (undetected)	(152680) 1998 KJ9	233.2	0.61	279–900	19.5	JPL · CAD

The year 2011 was notable as two asteroids with size 100 m (330 ft) or more approached within one lunar distance.

=== Extremes in relative speed ===
The average near-Earth asteroid, such as 2019 VF_{5}, passes Earth at 18 km/s. The average short-period comet passes Earth at 30 km/s, and the average long-period comet passes Earth at 53 km/s. A retrograde parabolic Oort cloud comet (e=1, i=180°) could pass Earth at 72 km/s when 1 AU from the Sun.

Fastest asteroid within 1 LD for each year (these asteroids have eccentric orbits)
Date of closest approach	Object	Earth distance (LD)	Sun distance (AU)	Velocity wrt Earth (km/s)	Velocity wrt Sun (km/s)	Approx. size (m)	(H) (abs. mag.)	References
2025-01-23	2025 BP_{4}	0.83	0.984	22.1	36.5	3.7–8.3	29.3	JPL Horizons
2024-02-11	2024 CH_{4}	0.28	0.987	24.0	34.3	7.7–17	27.7	JPL Horizons
2023-10-20	2023 TK_{15}	0.99	0.996	21.9	33.7	18–39	25.9	JPL Horizons
2022-12-23	2022 YW_{6}	0.55	0.983	29.8	38.1	4.8–11	28.7	JPL Horizons
2021-10-27	2021 UA_{7}	0.33	0.994	27.7	37.0	4.7–11	28.8	JPL Horizons
2020-03-14	2020 FD_{2}	0.85	0.995	33.4	38.6	19–43	25.7	JPL Horizons
2019-03-28	2019 FC_{1}	0.27	0.998	25.9	37.1	20–45	25.6	JPL Horizons
2018-04-15	2018 GE3	0.50	1.003	29.6	35.9	46–100	23.8	JPL Horizons
2017-08-14	2017 QP1	0.16	1.013	24.0	33.4	37–83	24.3	JPL Horizons
2016-03-08	2016 EV_{28}	0.40	0.993	25.6	36.6	5.4–12	28.5	JPL Horizons
2015-03-12	2015 EO_{6}	0.29	0.994	23.8	37.5	2.4–5.4	30.2	JPL Horizons

The slowest passing speeds during close approaches are dominated by the perigees of asteroids captured by Earth as temporary satellites. This list includes close approaches that weren't observed, but the orbit was calculated with high precision.

Slowest asteroids passing within 1 LD of Earth (these asteroids have Earth-like orbits)
Date of closest approach	Object	Earth distance (LD)	Sun distance (AU)	Velocity wrt Earth (km/s)	Velocity wrt Sun (km/s)	Approx. size (m)	(H) (abs. mag.)	Notes	References
2007-03-25	2006 RH120	0.92	0.997	1.37	31.1	3.3–7.5	29.5	temporary satellite perigee	JPL Horizons
2018-10-26	2020 CD3	0.84	0.994	1.45	31.3	1.2–2.7	31.7	temporary satellite perigee; undetected	JPL Horizons
2019-09-10	2020 CD_{3}	0.79	1.007	1.47	28.2	1.2–2.7	31.7	temporary satellite perigee; undetected	JPL Horizons
2018-08-09	2020 CD_{3}	0.79	1.013	1.48	30.7	1.2–2.7	31.7	temporary satellite perigee; undetected	JPL Horizons
2019-11-18	2020 CD_{3}	0.75	0.989	1.54	29.8	1.2–2.7	31.7	temporary satellite perigee; undetected	JPL Horizons
2019-06-30	2020 CD_{3}	0.72	1.018	1.56	28.1	1.2–2.7	31.7	temporary satellite perigee; undetected	JPL Horizons
2007-06-14	2006 RH_{120}	0.72	1.015	1.57	30.3	3.3–7.5	29.5	temporary satellite perigee	JPL Horizons
2014-12-07	2014 WX_{202}	0.98	0.985	1.67	30.6	3.2–7.1	29.6		JPL Horizons
2017-12-06	2020 CD_{3}	0.65	0.986	1.67	28.7	1.2–2.7	31.7	temporary satellite perigee; undetected	JPL Horizons
2018-02-19	2020 CD_{3}	0.58	0.989	1.77	29.5	1.2–2.7	31.7	temporary satellite perigee; undetected	JPL Horizons
1979-09-02	2014 WX_{202}	0.87	1.008	1.79	29.4	3.2–7.1	29.6	undetected	JPL Horizons
2020-05-09	2021 GM1	0.71	1.009	1.81	30.5	2.2–4.9	30.4	precovery	JPL Horizons
2017-09-18	2020 CD_{3}	0.52	1.000	1.89	27.9	1.2–2.7	31.7	temporary satellite perigee; undetected	JPL Horizons
2011-06-02	2009 BD	0.90	1.015	1.91	30.1	6.4–14	28.1		JPL Horizons

== Closest approaches by size ==
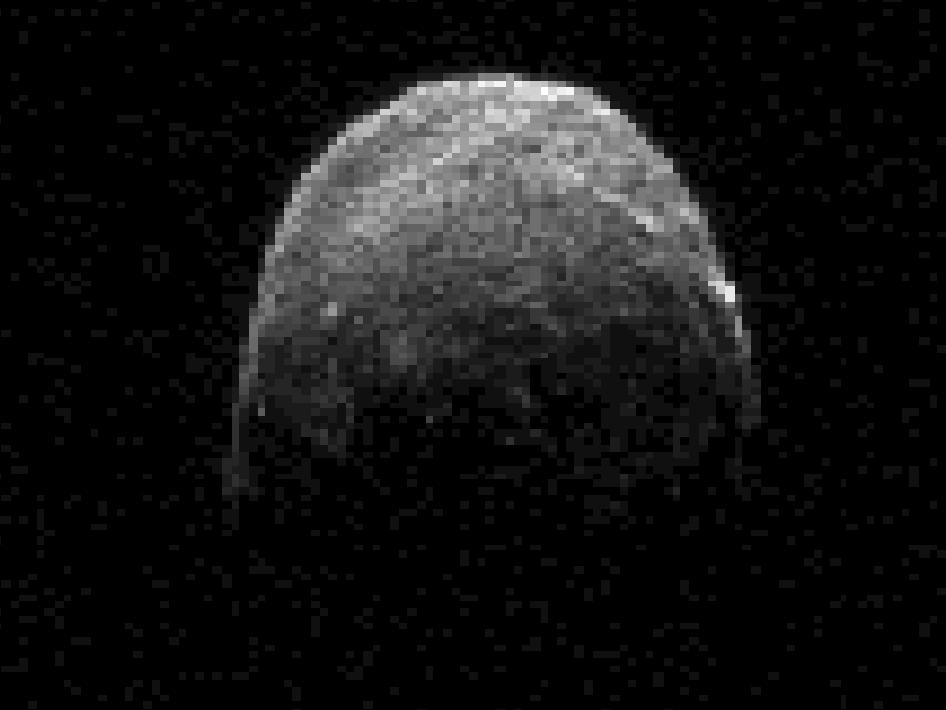
Goldstone radar image of asteroid 2005 YU55 taken November 7, 2011

Below are lists of the closest approaches in different size ranges, the limits of which correspond to with size limits commonly considered in impact hazard scenarios. The list includes close approaches an orbital period or more before or after the closest observations in time which were derived by orbit calculation.

The diameter of most asteroids has not been measured directly, and can only be estimated from their brightness and assumed surface reflectivity or albedo. While the measured albedo of asteroids can be as low as 6% and as high as 20%, the default estimated size for asteroids in the CNEOS databases is calculated for an albedo of 14%, which is also used for the size range limits below. For objects with uncertain albedo, the CNEOS close approach database provides a possible size range, which is shown in all the lists on this page. In case other, more precise size estimates are available from other sources, the tables below show those, too, but asteroids are sorted according to the size resp. absolute magnitude in the CNEOS database.

=== Closest with an estimated diameter under 7 m (H > 28.5) ===
If an asteroid less than 7 metres (23 ft) across (with an absolute magnitude greater than 28.5) impacts the Earth, it will produce spectacular but mostly harmless fireballs and meteorite falls. All of the asteroids that were destroyed in predicted impacts on Earth up to 2024 were in this size range. The list below shows all close approaches within 10,000 km (6,214 mi) from the centre of the Earth (or about 3,600 km (2,200 mi) above its surface).

Nominal geocentric distance			Date of closest approach	Object	Size (m) (approximate)	Abs. mag.	Ref
(km)	(LD)	(AU)	Date of closest approach	Object	Size (m) (approximate)	Abs. mag.	Ref
6,600	0.0172	0.0000441	2025-10-30	2025 UC11	0.41–0.93	34.06	JPL · CAD
7,726	0.0201	0.0000516	2024-12-01	2024 XA	1.2–2.8	31.6	JPL · CAD
8,098	0.0211	0.0000541	2024-06-06	2024 LH_{1}	1.8–4.1	30.8	JPL · CAD
8,850	0.0230	0.0000592	2024-10-30	2024 UG_{9}	0.80–1.8	32.6	JPL · CAD
9,317	0.0242	0.0000623	2020-08-16	2020 QG	2.8–6.2	29.9	JPL · CAD
9,427	0.0245	0.0000630	2021-10-25	2021 UA1	1.1–2.5	31.8	JPL · CAD
9,712	0.0253	0.0000649	2025-01-26	2025 BP_{6}	1.1–2.6	31.8	JPL · CAD
9,967	0.0259	0.0000666	2023-01-27	2023 BU	3.1–6.9	29.7	JPL · CAD

=== Closest with an estimated diameter between 7 m and 20 m (28.5 ≥ H > 26.25) ===
If an asteroid at the bottom of this size range, one 7 metres (23 ft) across (with an absolute magnitude greater than 28.5), has average asteroid density and impacts the Earth at average meteor speed, its impact energy is about 15 kilotons TNT equivalent, or roughly equivalent to the blast energy of the Hiroshima bomb. The list below shows all close approaches of objects in the range between 7 and 20 metres across within the radius of the geostationary orbit or 42,164 km (26,199 mi) from the centre of the Earth.

Nominal geocentric distance			Date of closest approach	Object	Size (m) (approximate)	Abs. mag.	Ref
(km)	(LD)	(AU)	Date of closest approach	Object	Size (m) (approximate)	Abs. mag.	Ref
18,651	0.0485	0.000125	2011-06-27	2011 MD	6.7–15	28.0	JPL · CAD
27,380	0.0712	0.000183	2023-11-17	2023 WA	5.3–12	28.5	JPL · CAD
29,336	0.0763	0.000196	2024-12-06	2024 XA_{6}	13–30	26.5	JPL · CAD
29,870	0.0777	0.000200	2024-10-10	2024 TH_{11}	9.3–21	27.3	JPL · CAD
32,770	0.0852	0.000219	2023-11-07	2023 VB_{2}	6.3–13	28.2	JPL · CAD
33,490	0.0871	0.000224	2018-08-10	2018 PD20	8.8–20	27.4	JPL · CAD
37,870	0.0985	0.000253	2019-09-05	2019 RP_{1}	7.0–16	27.9	JPL · CAD
39,908	0.1038	0.000267	2014-09-07	2014 RC	11–25	26.9	JPL · CAD
40,483	0.1053	0.000271	2016-09-07	2016 RB_{1}	5.8–13	28.3	JPL · CAD

=== Closest with an estimated diameter between 20 m and 50 m (26.25 ≥ H > 24.25) ===
The bottom of this size range, 20 m (66 ft) corresponds to the average size of an asteroid with the smallest impact energy (1 megaton) considered for impact hazard ratings on the Torino scale. 20 m (66 ft) is also about the size of the Chelyabinsk meteor, which produced a meteor ending in an airburst briefly brighter than the Sun that injured over a thousand people and damaged thousands of buildings. The list below shows all close approaches within 100,000 km (62,137 mi) from the centre of the Earth.

Nominal geocentric distance			Date of closest approach	Object	Size (m) (approximate)	Abs. mag.	Ref
(km)	(LD)	(AU)	Date of closest approach	Object	Size (m) (approximate)	Abs. mag.	Ref
31,620	0.082	0.000211	2016-03-11	2016 EF_{195}	21–47	25.5	JPL · CAD
60,810	0.158	0.000406	1957-12-10 (undetected)	2010 XW_{58}	28–62	24.9	JPL · CAD
61,250	0.159	0.000409	2017-08-29 (precovery)	2019 DP	26–58	25.1	JPL · CAD
62,640	0.163	0.000419	2017-08-14	2017 QP1	37–83	24.3	JPL · CAD
69,732	0.181	0.000466	2018-02-09	2018 CB	18–39	25.9	JPL · CAD
72,228	0.188	0.000483	2009-03-02	2009 DD45	15–41	25.8	JPL · CAD
77,930	0.203	0.000521	2020-06-05	2020 FB_{7}	16–36	26.1	JPL · CAD
85,220	0.222	0.000570	2019-11-19	2019 WH	15–34	26.2	JPL · CAD
86,569	0.225	0.000579	2016-08-28	2016 GA_{2}	25–57	25.1	JPL · CAD
92,000	0.239	0.000613	1968-04-23 (undetected)	2008 GD_{110}	33–75	24.5	JPL · CAD

=== Closest with an estimated diameter between 50 m and 140 m (24.25 ≥ H > 22.00) ===
NASA's Planetary Defense Coordination Office (PDCO) considers objects with a diameter of at least 50 m (164 ft) capable of destroying a concentrated urban area if they impact Earth. The asteroid causing the Tunguska event is estimated at 50–80 m (164–262 ft) in diameter. The list below shows all close approaches within 1 LD (384,400 km; 238,900 mi) from the centre of the Earth.

Nominal geocentric distance			Date of closest approach	Object	Size (m) (approximate)	Abs. mag.	Ref
(km)	(LD)	(AU)	Date of closest approach	Object	Size (m) (approximate)	Abs. mag.	Ref
34,053	0.089	0.000228	2013-02-15	367943 Duende	39–86	24.2	JPL · CAD
71,355	0.186	0.000477	2019-07-25	2019 OK	58–130	23.3	JPL · CAD
119,985	0.312	0.000802	2002-06-14	2002 MN	48–110	23.7	JPL · CAD
192,950	0.502	0.00129	2018-04-15	2018 GE3	46–100	23.8	JPL · CAD
202,960	0.528	0.00130	2018-06-15	2010 WC9	53–120	23.5	JPL · CAD
212,600	0.553	0.00142	1936-01-06 (undetected)	2010 VB_{1}	58–130	22.3	JPL · CAD
245,000	0.637	0.00164	2021-09-16	2021 SG	42–94	24.0	JPL · CAD
296,984	0.773	0.00199	2018-01-02	2018 AH	77–170	22.7	JPL · CAD
306,420	0.797	0.00205	2020-06-05	2020 LD	89–200	22.4	JPL · CAD
328,224	0.854	0.00219	1976-10-17 (undetected)	2013 UG_{1}	81–180	22.6	JPL · CAD
329,680	0.858	0.00220	1991-04-08 (undetected)	2012 UE34	58–130	23.3	JPL · CAD
347,400	0.904	0.00232	2011-12-03	2011 XC2	61–140	23.2	JPL · CAD
357,785	0.931	0.00239	2019-07-24	2019 OD	56–120	23.4	JPL · CAD

=== Closest with an estimated diameter between 140 m and 1 km (22.0 ≥ H > 17.75) ===
In 2005, the United States Congress gave NASA an updated mandate to detect 90% of NEOs with diameters of 140 m (459 ft) or greater. NASA's PDCO considers objects with a diameter of at least 140 m (459 ft) capable of creating an impact crater at least 1–2 km (0.62–1.24 mi) across and causing regional devastation if they impact Earth. The list below shows all close approaches within 2 LD (768,800 km; 477,700 mi) from the centre of the Earth.

Nominal geocentric distance			Date of closest approach	Object	Size (m) (approximate)	Abs. mag.	Ref
(km)	(LD)	(AU)	Date of closest approach	Object	Size (m) (approximate)	Abs. mag.	Ref
75,300	0.196	0.000503	1957-02-01 (undetected)	2019 CD_{2}	260–590	20.0	JPL · CAD
120,160	0.313	0.000803	2001-11-08 (undetected)	2017 VW13	200–440	20.6	JPL · CAD
233,220	0.607	0.00156	1914-12-31 (undetected)	(152680) 1998 KJ9	330–740	19.5	JPL · CAD
263,600	0.686	0.00176	1971-04-11 (undetected)	(612358) 2002 JE9	140–310	21.4	JPL · CAD
295,420	0.769	0.00197	2024-06-29	2024 MK	100–230; 150	22.0	JPL · CAD
314,290	0.818	0.00210	1982-11-04 (undetected)	2012 TY_{52}	150–330	21.3	JPL · CAD
324,931	0.845	0.00217	2011-11-08	(308635) 2005 YU55	400	21.9	JPL · CAD
346,940	0.903	0.00232	1925-08-30 (undetected)	(163132) 2002 CU11	460 ±17	18.6	JPL · CAD
350,000	0.911	0.00234	1918-09-17 (undetected)	(458732) 2011 MD5	730–1600	17.8	JPL · CAD
369,000	0.960	0.00247	1923-06-26 (undetected)	2021 MK_{1}	140–320	21.3	JPL · CAD
403,240	1.049	0.00270	1985-09-02 (undetected)	(371660) 2007 CN_{26}	160–350	21.1	JPL · CAD
413,930	1.077	0.00277	1965-09-15 (undetected)	2021 PC_{7}	350–790	19.4	JPL · CAD
432,439	1.125	0.00289	2006-07-03	(612901) 2004 XP14	290–650; 130–260	19.8	JPL · CAD
453,160	1.179	0.00303	1996-05-19	1996 JA_{1}	170–380	21.0	JPL · CAD
486,807	1.266	0.00325	2015-10-31	2015 TB145	260–580; 625–700	20.0	JPL · CAD
518,530	1.349	0.00347	2013-06-15 (undetected)	2021 MK_{1}	140–320	21.3	JPL · CAD
526,974	1.371	0.00352	2002-02-18	2002 NY40	420–640	19.0	JPL · CAD
550,500	1.432	0.00368	1938-03-11 (undetected)	2013 FA_{8}	160–370	21.1	JPL · CAD
554,169	1.442	0.00370	2008-01-29	2007 TU24	230–510; 250	20.3	JPL · CAD
594,400	1.546	0.00397	1983-03-19 (undetected)	2018 VG_{3}	180–390	20.9	JPL · CAD
624,154	1.624	0.00417	2011-04-25	2011 JA	140–310	21.4	JPL · CAD
649,700	1.690	0.00434	1950-11-16 (undetected)	2023 GQ2	280–630	19.9	JPL · CAD
677,140	1.762	0.00453	1975-01-31 (undetected)	(27002) 1998 DV_{9}	580–1300	18.3	JPL · CAD
684,010	1.779	0.00457	1989-03-22	4581 Asclepius	190–420	20.7	JPL · CAD
726,400	1.890	0.00486	1959-07-12 (undetected)	2017 NM_{6}	460–1000	18.8	JPL · CAD
750,820	1.953	0.00502	1919-01-04 (undetected)	(509352) 2007 AG	250–550	20.2	JPL · CAD

=== Closest with an estimated diameter above 1 km (17.75 ≥ H) ===
The original mandate to NASA given by the United States Congress in 1998 was to detect 90% of near-Earth asteroids over 1 km (0.62 mi) diameter (that threaten global devastation) by 2008. NASA's PDCO considers objects with a diameter of at least 1 km (0.62 mi) capable of creating an impact crater at least 10 km (6.2 mi) across and causing global devastation if they impact Earth. The list below shows all close approaches within 5 LD (1,922,000 km; 1,194,000 mi) from the centre of the Earth.

Nominal geocentric distance			Date of closest approach	Object	Size (m) (approximate)	Abs. mag.	Ref
(km)	(LD)	(AU)	Date of closest approach	Object	Size (m) (approximate)	Abs. mag.	Ref
634,523	1.651	0.00424	1942-04-26 (undetected)	69230 Hermes	770–1700; 810	17.7	JPL · CAD
740,640	1.927	0.00495	1937-10-30	69230 Hermes	770–1700; 810	17.7	JPL · CAD
1,060,967	2.760	0.00709	1981-05-18 (precovery)	(143651) 2003 QO104	1600–3600	16.1	JPL · CAD
1,125,000	2.927	0.00752	1933-01-17 (undetected)	(7482) 1994 PC_{1}	1052 ±303	16.6	JPL · CAD
1,394,570	3.628	0.00932	1969-08-27 (undetected)	(192642) 1999 RD32	1300–2900; 5000	16.5	JPL · CAD
1,549,407	4.031	0.01036	2004-09-29	4179 Toutatis	5400; 4750×1950	15.3	JPL · CAD
1,885,310	4.905	0.01260	1961-04-12 (undetected)	(163243) 2002 FB3	1682 ±13	16.5	JPL · CAD

== Predicted encounters ==
Incomplete list of asteroids larger than about 50 m (160 ft) predicted to pass close to Earth (see also asteroid impact prediction and Sentry (monitoring system)):

Nominal geocentric distance (AU)	Nominal geocentric distance (km)	Size (m) (estimated)	Date of closest approach	Object	JPL-Ref
0.000254	38,000	325	April 13, 2029	99942 Apophis	JPL · CAD
0.000670	100,200	75–170	October 19, 2129	2007 UW1	JPL · CAD
0.000721	107,800	50–120	April 8, 2041	2012 UE34	JPL · CAD
0.001572	235,200	170–370	January 2, 2101	(456938) 2007 YV56	JPL · CAD
0.001585	237,000	360±40	November 8, 2075	(308635) 2005 YU55	JPL · CAD
0.001629	243,700	370–840	December 1, 2140	(153201) 2000 WO107	JPL · CAD
0.001635^{**}	244,600	190–420	October 25, 2077	(549948) 2011 WL2	JPL · CAD
0.001663	248,800	700–1500	June 26, 2028	(153814) 2001 WN5	JPL · CAD
0.001980	296,200	170–370	January 22, 2148	(85640) 1998 OX4	JPL · CAD
0.002222	332,500	190–250	May 28, 2065	2005 WY55	JPL · CAD
0.002241	335,200	75–170	March 23, 2146	2009 DO_{111}	JPL · CAD
0.00257	384,400	for comparison, this is the average distance to the Moon			

A list of predicted NEO approaches at larger distances is maintained as a database by the NASA Near Earth Object Program.

** Only the nominal (best-fit) orbit shows a passage this close. The uncertainty region is still somewhat large due to a short observation arc.

== Earth-grazers ==
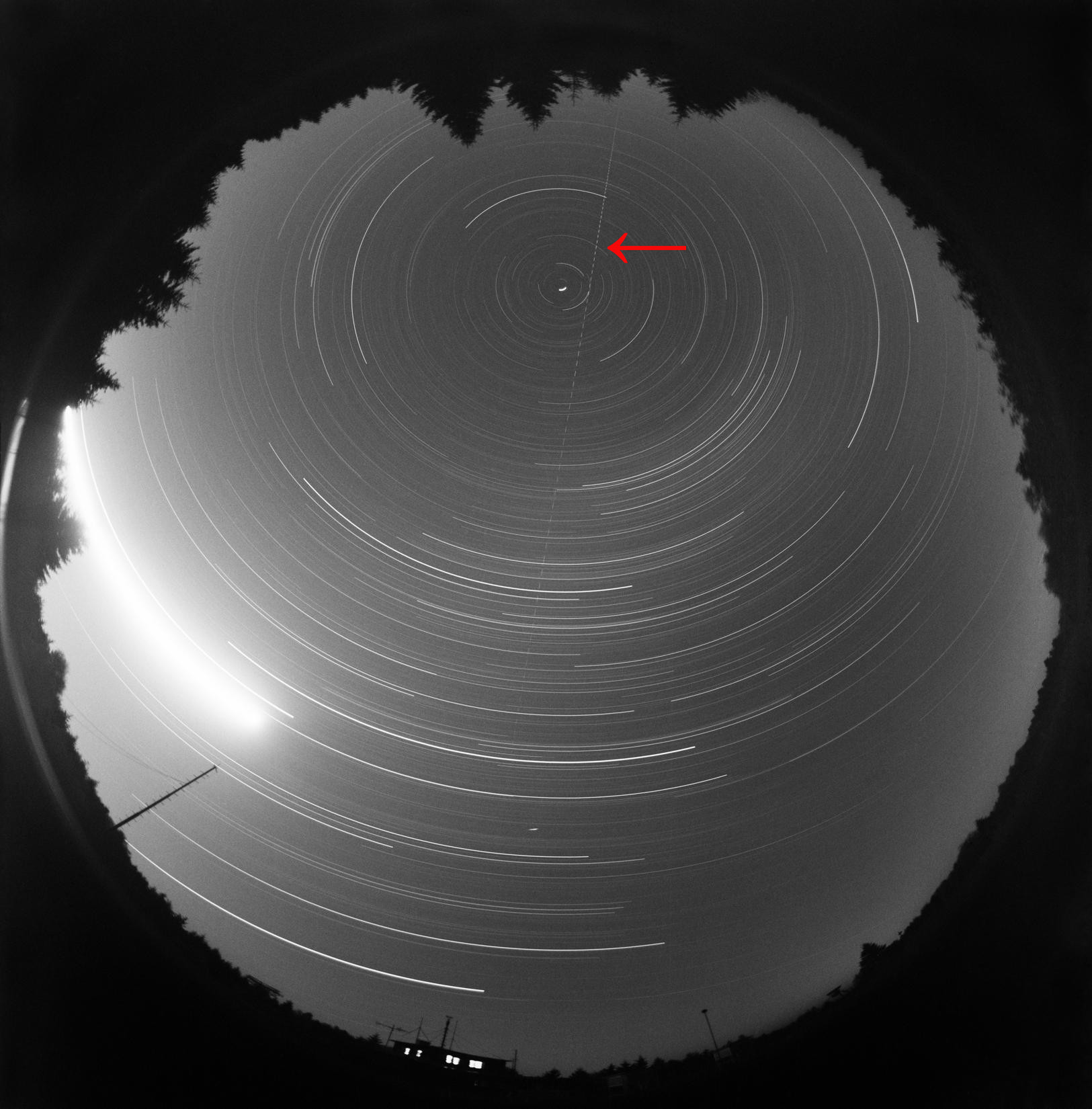
All-sky photo with the Earth-grazing meteoroid of 13 October 1990 (the light track across the picture going from the south to the north) taken at Červená hora (Czechoslovakia), one of the stations of the European Fireball Network. The bright track on the left is the Moon.

Objects which enter and then leave Earth's atmosphere, the so-called Earth-grazers, are a distinct phenomenon, inasmuch as entering the lower atmosphere can constitute an impact event rather than a close pass. Earth-grazer can also be short for a body that "grazes" the orbit of the Earth, in a different context.

Altitude (km)	Size (m) (approximate)	Mass (kg) (approximate)	Date of closest approach	Object	Note	Ref.
0	mean sea level					
8.8	Mount Everest (height)					
58	5	10^{5}–10^{6}	August 10, 1972	1972 Great Daylight Fireball above the United States and Canada	First scientifically observed	
71.4		100	March 29, 2006	2006 Earth-grazing Fireball above Japan		
98.7		44	October 13, 1990	1990 Earth-grazing Fireball above Czechoslovakia and Poland	First captured from 2 distant locations, which enabled computing its orbit by geometrical methods	
			August 7, 2007	2007 Earth-grazing Fireball	Its pre-encounter orbit belonged to the rare Aten type	
100	Kármán line					

== Animations ==
Known near-Earth objects – as of January 2018 Video (0:55; July 23, 2018)

Animation of the 2015 TB145 (NEO) flyby, as seen from the center of the Earth, with hourly trace circles along the path of motion

== Overview ==
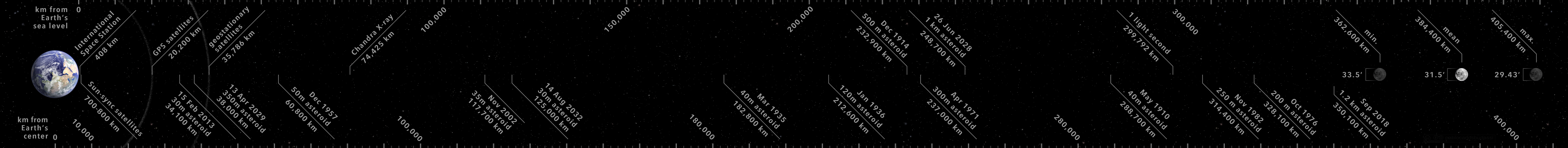
Diagram showing spacecraft and notable asteroids (past and future) between the Earth and the Moon.

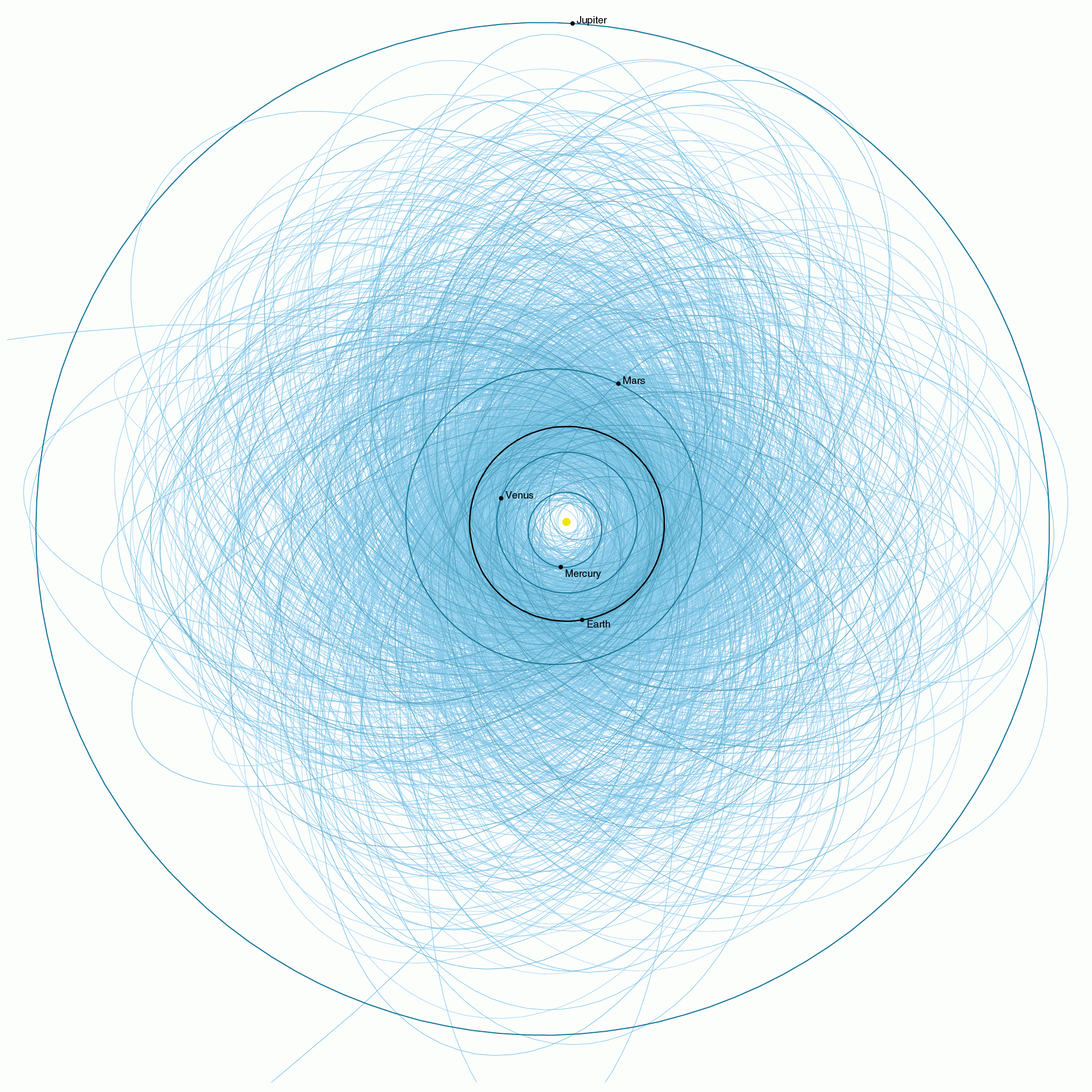
Plot of orbits of known Potentially Hazardous Asteroids (size over 140 m [460 ft] and passing within 7.6 million km [4.7 million mi] of Earth's orbit) as of early 2013 (alternate image)

== See also ==
- List of predicted asteroid impacts on Earth
