= List of asteroid close approaches to Earth in 2011 =

- Asteroids which came closer to Earth than the Moon in 2011 by time of discovery
- After closest approach: 19 (59.4%)
- < 24 hours before: 1 (3.1%)
- up to 7 days before: 10 (31.2%)
- > one week before: 0 (0.0%)
- > 7 weeks before: 0 (0.0%)
- > one year before: 2 (6.2%)
Other years

Below is the list of asteroid close approaches to Earth in 2011.

== Timeline of close approaches less than one lunar distance from Earth in 2011 ==
A list of known near-Earth asteroid close approaches less than 1 lunar distance (384,400 km or 0.00257 AU) from Earth in 2011, based on the close approach database of the Center for Near-Earth Object Studies (CNEOS).

The CNEOS database of close approaches lists some close approaches a full orbit or more before the discovery of the object, derived by orbit calculation. The list below only includes close approaches that are evidenced by observations, thus the pre-discovery close approaches would only be included if the object was found by precovery, but there was no such close approach in 2011.

This list and the relevant databases do not consider impacts as close approaches, thus this list does not include any of the objects that collided with Earth's atmosphere in 2011, none of which were discovered in advance, but were observed visually or recorded by sensors designed to detect detonation of nuclear devices.

Rows highlighted red indicate objects which were not discovered until after closest approach

Rows highlighted yellow indicate objects discovered less than 24 hours before closest approach

Rows highlighted green indicate objects discovered more than one week before closest approach

Rows highlighted turquoise indicate objects discovered more than 7 weeks before closest approach

Rows highlighted blue indicate objects discovered more than one year before closest approach
(i.e. objects successfully cataloged on a previous orbit, rather than being detected during final approach)

Date of closest approach	Date discovered	Object	Nominal geocentric distance (AU) (Note: Distance from the center of Earth to the center of the object. See the NASA/JPL Solar System Dynamics Glossary: Geocentric. Earth has a radius of approximately 6,400 km.)	Size (m) (approximate) (Note: For asteroids without a well determined size an albedo of 0.05 is assumed. An albedo of 0.05 establishes an approximate upper limit to the size of the asteroid.)	(H)	Closer approach to Moon	Refs
2011-01-11	2011-01-13	2011 AM_{37}	0.00086 AU (129,000 km; 80,000 mi)	2.8–6.2	29.9		data · 2011 AM_{37}
2011-01-17	2011-01-14	2011 AN_{52}	0.00213 AU (319,000 km; 198,000 mi)	5.1–11	28.6	Yes	data · 2011 AN_{52}
2011-01-20	2011-01-24	2011 BY_{10}	0.00238 AU (356,000 km; 221,000 mi)	10–23	27.1	Yes	data · 2011 BY_{10}
2011-01-25	2011-01-26	2011 BW_{11}	0.00086 AU (129,000 km; 80,000 mi)	5.8–13	28.3		data · 2011 BW_{11}
2011-01-31	2011-02-05	2011 CA_{4}	0.00165 AU (247,000 km; 153,000 mi)	10–23	27.1		data · 2011 CA_{4}
2011-02-04	2011-02-04	2011 CQ1	0.000079 AU (11,800 km; 7,300 mi)	1–2.3	32.1		data · 2011 CQ_{1}
2011-02-06	2011-02-07	2011 CF_{22}	0.00027 AU (40,000 km; 25,000 mi)	1.8–4	30.9		data · 2011 CF_{22}
2011-02-09	2011-02-07	2011 CA_{7}	0.00069 AU (103,000 km; 64,000 mi)	2.3–5.2	30.3		data · 2011 CA_{7}
2011-02-23	2011-02-27	2011 DU_{9}	0.00192 AU (287,000 km; 178,000 mi)	12–27	26.7		data · 2011 DU_{9}
2011-03-03	2011-03-04	2011 EN_{11}	0.00166 AU (248,000 km; 154,000 mi)	7–16	27.9		data · 2011 EN_{11}
2011-03-07	2011-03-05	2011 EY_{11}	0.000876 AU (131,000 km; 81,400 mi)	5.3–12	28.5		data · 2011 EY_{11}
2011-03-08	2011-03-10	2011 EM_{40}	0.00162 AU (242,000 km; 151,000 mi)	6.7–15	28.0		data · 2011 EM_{40}
2011-03-16	2011-03-15	2011 EB_{74}	0.00219 AU (328,000 km; 204,000 mi)	11–25	26.9		data · 2011 EB_{74}
2011-04-06	2011-04-04	2011 GW_{9}	0.00133 AU (199,000 km; 124,000 mi)	6.4–14	28.1		data · 2011 GW_{9}
2011-04-06	2011-04-04	2011 GP_{28}	0.00064 AU (96,000 km; 59,000 mi)	3.5–7.8	29.4		data · 2011 GP_{28}
2011-05-05	2011-05-08	2011 JV_{10}	0.00232 AU (347,000 km; 216,000 mi)	3.1–6.8	29.7	Yes	data · 2011 JV_{10}
2011-06-02	2009-01-16	2009 BD	0.00232 AU (347,000 km; 216,000 mi)	6.4–14	28.1		data · 2009 BD
2011-06-27	2011-06-22	2011 MD	0.000125 AU (18,700 km; 11,600 mi)	6.7–15	28.0		data · 2011 MD
2011-07-24	2011-08-06	2011 PU_{1}	0.00224 AU (335,000 km; 208,000 mi)	20–45	25.6	Yes	data · 2011 PU_{1}
2011-07-28	2011-07-31	2011 OD_{18}	0.00115 AU (172,000 km; 107,000 mi)	13–30	26.5		data · 2011 OD_{18}
2011-09-27	2011-09-23	2011 SE_{58}	0.00159 AU (238,000 km; 148,000 mi)	7.3–16	27.8		data · 2011 SE_{58}
2011-09-28	2011-10-01	2011 TO	0.00086 AU (129,000 km; 80,000 mi)	13–29	26.6		data · 2011 TO
2011-09-30	2011-09-29	2011 SM_{173}	0.00194 AU (290,000 km; 180,000 mi)	7.3–16	27.8		data · 2011 SM_{173}
2011-10-12	2011-10-17	2011 UT	0.00152 AU (227,000 km; 141,000 mi)	18–41	25.8	Yes	data · 2011 UT
2011-10-17	2009-10-15	2009 TM_{8}	0.00226 AU (338,000 km; 210,000 mi)	5.6–12	28.4	Yes	data · 2009 TM_{8}
2011-10-26	2011-10-27	2011 UL_{169}	0.00177 AU (265,000 km; 165,000 mi)	5.9–13	28.3		data · 2011 UL_{169}
2011-10-28	2011-10-30	2011 UX_{255}	0.00093 AU (139,000 km; 86,000 mi)	8.8–20	27.4		data · 2011 UX_{255}
2011-11-08	2005-12-28	(308635) 2005 YU55	0.00217 AU (325,000 km; 202,000 mi)	360	21.9	Yes	data · 2005 YU_{55}
2011-12-03	2011-12-08	2011 XC2	0.00232 AU (347,000 km; 216,000 mi)	61–140	23.2	Yes	data · 2011 XC_{2}
2011-12-28	2011-12-29	2011 YC_{40}	0.00071 AU (106,000 km; 66,000 mi)	3.1–7	29.6		data · 2011 YC_{40}
2011-12-29	2012-01-01	2012 AQ	0.00180 AU (269,000 km; 167,000 mi)	1.9–4.3	30.7		data · 2012 AQ
2011-12-30	2011-12-31	2011 YC_{63}	0.00161 AU (241,000 km; 150,000 mi)	4.2–9.4	29.0		data · 2011 YC_{63}

=== Warning times by size ===
This sub-section visualises the warning times of the close approaches listed in the above table, depending on the size of the asteroid. The sizes of the charts show the relative sizes of the asteroids to scale. For comparison, the approximate size of a person is also shown. This is based the absolute magnitude of each asteroid, an approximate measure of size based on brightness.

Absolute magnitude H ≥ 30 (smallest)

Silhouette of man standing and facing forward

(size of a person for comparison)

Absolute magnitude 30 > H ≥ 29

Absolute magnitude 29 > H ≥ 28

Absolute magnitude 27-28

Absolute magnitude 27 > H ≥ 26

Absolute magnitude 26 > H ≥ 25

Absolute magnitude 25 > H (largest)

- After closest approach: 1 (50.0%)
- < 24 hours before: 0 (0.0%)
- up to 7 days before: 0 (0.0%)
- > one week before: 0 (0.0%)
- > 7 weeks before: 0 (0.0%)
- > one year before: 1 (50.0%)

== See also ==
- List of asteroid close approaches to Earth
- List of asteroid close approaches to Earth in 2010
- List of asteroid close approaches to Earth in 2012
