= List of asteroid close approaches to Earth in 2000–2007 =

- Asteroids which came closer to Earth than the Moon in 2000–2007 by time of discovery
- After closest approach: 23 (43.4%)
- < 24 hours before: 6 (11.3%)
- up to 7 days before: 22 (41.5%)
- > one week before: 0 (0.0%)
- > 7 weeks before: 2 (3.8%)
- > one year before: 0 (0.0%)
Other years

Below is the list of asteroid close approaches to Earth in 2000–2007.

== Timeline of close approaches less than one lunar distance from Earth in 2000–2007 ==
A list of known near-Earth asteroid (NEA) close approaches less than 1 lunar distance (384,400 km or 0.00257 AU) from Earth in 2000–2007, based on the close approach database of the Center for Near-Earth Object Studies (CNEOS). Prior to this time period, only one asteroid each in 1991 and 1993 and two in 1994 have been observed to pass by Earth within 1 LD, but the number of discoveries picked up with the start of the first NEA surveys with dedicated telescopes in the framework of the Spaceguard programme, such as Lincoln Near-Earth Asteroid Research (LINEAR), Lowell Observatory Near-Earth-Object Search (LONEOS) and Catalina Sky Survey (CSS) from 1998, Near-Earth Asteroid Tracking (NEAT) after its expansion from 2001 and Spacewatch in its upgraded state from 2002.

The CNEOS database of close approaches lists some close approaches a full orbit or more before the discovery of the object, derived by orbit calculation. The list below only includes close approaches that are evidenced by observations, thus the pre-discovery close approaches would only be included if the object was found by precovery, but there was no such close approach in 2008. The close approaches missed by observers includes the largest object known to have passed within 1 LD during this period: 2017 VW_{3}, an asteroid 200–440 m (660–1,400 ft) across (H = 20.6) which passed Earth undetected at a distance of about 120,160 km (74,660 mi; 0.3126 LD; 0.0008032 AU) on 8 November 2001.

This list and the relevant databases do not consider impacts as close approaches, thus this list does not include any of the objects that collided with Earth's atmosphere in 2000–2007, which were observed visually or recorded by sensors designed to detect detonation of nuclear devices. Up to 2007, none of the asteroids destroyed in impacts have been discovered in advance.

Rows highlighted red indicate objects which were not discovered until after closest approach

Rows highlighted yellow indicate objects discovered less than 24 hours before closest approach

Rows highlighted green indicate objects discovered more than one week before closest approach

Rows highlighted turquoise indicate objects discovered more than 7 weeks before closest approach

Rows highlighted blue indicate objects discovered more than one year before closest approach
(i.e. objects successfully cataloged on a previous orbit, rather than being detected during final approach)

Date of closest approach	Date discovered	Object	Nominal geocentric distance (AU) (Note: Distance from the center of Earth to the center of the object. See the NASA/JPL Solar System Dynamics Glossary: Geocentric. Earth has a radius of approximately 6,400 km.)	Nominal geocentric distance (LD)	Size (m) (approximate)	(H) (abs. mag.)	Closer approach to Moon	Refs
2001-01-15	2001-01-19	2001 BA_{16}	0.00205 AU (307,000 km; 191,000 mi)	0.797	17–38	26.0	Yes	data · 2001 BA_{16}
2002-06-14	2002-06-17	2002 MN	0.000803 AU (120,100 km; 74,600 mi)	0.312	48–110	23.7	Yes	data · 2002 MN
2002-12-11	2002-12-13	2002 XV_{90}	0.000787 AU (117,700 km; 73,200 mi)	0.306	23–52	25.3		data · 2002 XV_{90}
2003-04-29	2003-04-25	2003 HW_{10}	0.00221 AU (331,000 km; 205,000 mi)	0.859	11–24	27.0		data · 2003 HW_{10}
2003-09-19	2003-09-20	2003 SW_{130}	0.00108 AU (162,000 km; 100,000 mi)	0.421	4.0–9.0	29.1		data · 2003 SW_{130}
2003-09-27	2003-09-28	2003 SQ_{222}	0.000563 AU (84,200 km; 52,300 mi)	0.219	2.5–5.7	30.1		data · 2003 SQ_{222}
2003-10-12	2003-10-17	2003 UM_{3}	0.00185 AU (277,000 km; 172,000 mi)	0.721	6.4–14	28.1		data · 2003 UM_{3}
2003-12-06	2003-12-05	2003 XJ_{7}	0.000991 AU (148,300 km; 92,100 mi)	0.386	14–31	26.4		data · 2003 XJ_{7}
2004-03-18	2004-03-16	2004 FH	0.000328 AU (49,100 km; 30,500 mi)	0.128	14–31	26.4		data · 2004 FH
2004-03-27	2004-03-26	2004 FY_{15}	0.00160 AU (239,000 km; 149,000 mi)	0.62	16–36	26.1		data · 2004 FY_{15}
2004-03-31	2004-03-31	2004 FU162	0.0000863 AU (12,910 km; 8,020 mi)	0.034	3.4–7.6	29.5		data · 2004 FU_{162}
2004-04-18	2004-04-16	2004 HE	0.00185 AU (277,000 km; 172,000 mi)	0.720	12–26	26.8	Yes	data · 2004 HE
2004-07-16	2004-07-17	2004 OD_{4}	0.00111 AU (166,000 km; 103,000 mi)	0.431	11–24	27.0		data · 2004 OD_{4}
2004-09-13	2004-09-11	2004 RU_{109}	0.00247 AU (370,000 km; 230,000 mi)	0.960	14–31	26.4	Yes	data · 2004 RU_{109}
2004-09-21	2004-09-23	2004 ST_{26}	0.00246 AU (368,000 km; 229,000 mi)	0.956	15–33	26.3	Yes	data · 2004 ST_{26}
2004-10-24	2004-10-23	2004 UH_{1}	0.00198 AU (296,000 km; 184,000 mi)	0.771	6.4–14	28.1		data · 2004 UH_{1}
2004-12-16	2004-12-13	2004 XB_{45}	0.00217 AU (325,000 km; 202,000 mi)	0.846	15–34	26.2		data · 2004 XB_{45}
2004-12-19	2004-12-20	2004 YD_{5}	0.000227 AU (34,000 km; 21,100 mi)	0.088	3.7–8.2	29.3		data · 2004 YD_{5}
2005-01-13	2005-01-16	2005 BS_{1}	0.00176 AU (263,000 km; 164,000 mi)	0.683	8.4–19	27.5	Yes	data · 2005 BS_{1}
2005-03-18	2005-03-17	2005 FN	0.000963 AU (144,100 km; 89,500 mi)	0.375	11–25	26.9		data · 2005 FN
2005-10-10	2005-10-09	2005 TK_{50}	0.000863 AU (129,100 km; 80,200 mi)	0.336	4.5–10	28.9		data · 2005 TK_{50}
2005-10-30	2005-10-27	2005 UW_{5}	0.00125 AU (187,000 km; 116,000 mi)	0.487	8.4–19	27.5		data · 2005 UW_{5}
2005-11-26	2005-11-25	2005 WN_{3}	0.000560 AU (83,800 km; 52,100 mi)	0.218	2.8–6.2	29.9		data · 2005 WN_{3}
2005-12-05	2005-12-07	2005 XA_{8}	0.00145 AU (217,000 km; 135,000 mi)	0.565	19–43	25.7		data · 2005 XA_{8}
2006-01-28	2006-01-26	2006 BV_{39}	0.00225 AU (337,000 km; 209,000 mi)	0.877	4.0–9.0	29.1	Yes	data · 2006 BV_{39}
2006-01-29	2006-01-28	2006 BF_{56}	0.00137 AU (205,000 km; 127,000 mi)	0.532	3.2–7.1	29.6		data · 2006 BF_{56}
2006-02-23	2006-02-22	2006 DD_{1}	0.000785 AU (117,400 km; 73,000 mi)	0.306	13–30	26.5		data · 2006 DD_{1}
2006-02-24	2006-02-27	2006 DM_{63}	0.00153 AU (229,000 km; 142,000 mi)	0.596	12–27	26.7		data · 2006 DM_{63}
2006-03-08	2006-03-03	2006 EC	0.00181 AU (271,000 km; 168,000 mi)	0.704	13–28	26.6		data · 2006 EC
2006-07-23	2006-07-22	2006 OK_{3}	0.00188 AU (281,000 km; 175,000 mi)	0.731	10–23	27.1		data · 2006 OK_{3}
2006-08-31	2006-08-31	2006 QM_{111}	0.00107 AU (160,000 km; 99,000 mi)	0.416	8.0–18	27.6		data · 2006 QM_{111}
2006-10-21	2006-10-23	2006 UE_{64}	0.00114 AU (171,000 km; 106,000 mi)	0.442	6.7–15	28.0		data · 2006 UE_{64}
2006-10-30	2006-10-28	2006 UJ_{185}	0.00179 AU (268,000 km; 166,000 mi)	0.695	7.0–16	27.9		data · 2006 UJ_{185}
2006-11-16	2006-11-18	2006 WP_{1}	0.00208 AU (311,000 km; 193,000 mi)	0.808	6.1–14	28.2		data · 2006 WP_{1}
2006-11-20	2006-11-23	2006 WX_{29}	0.00221 AU (331,000 km; 205,000 mi)	0.859	7.3–16	27.8		data · 2006 WX_{29}
2006-11-21	2006-11-17	2006 WV	0.00233 AU (349,000 km; 217,000 mi)	0.906	9.7–22	27.2		data · 2006 WV
2007-01-18	2007-01-16	2007 BD	0.00217 AU (325,000 km; 202,000 mi)	0.843	22–49	25.4		data · 2007 BD
2007-02-11	2007-02-13	2007 CC_{27}	0.00221 AU (331,000 km; 205,000 mi)	0.860	11–24	27.0	Yes	data · 2007 CC_{27}
2007-02-21	2007-02-23	2007 DN_{41}	0.00202 AU (302,000 km; 188,000 mi)	0.786	14–31	26.4		data · 2007 DN_{41}
2007-03-11	2007-03-09	2007 EH	0.00117 AU (175,000 km; 109,000 mi)	0.457	8.0–18	27.6		data · 2007 EH
2007-03-13	2007-03-09	2007 EK	0.00177 AU (265,000 km; 165,000 mi)	0.687	3.7–8.2	29.3		data · 2007 EK
2007-03-25	2006-09-14	2006 RH120	0.00236 AU (353,000 km; 219,000 mi)	0.920	3.3–7.5	29.5		data · 2006 RH_{120}
2007-04-24	2007-04-23	2007 HB_{15}	0.00147 AU (220,000 km; 137,000 mi)	0.572	7.7–17	27.7		data · 2007 HB_{15}
2007-06-14	2006-09-14	2006 RH120	0.00185 AU (277,000 km; 172,000 mi)	0.720	3.3–7.5	29.5		data · 2006 RH_{120}
2007-09-05	2007-09-04	2007 RS_{1}	0.000492 AU (73,600 km; 45,700 mi)	0.191	1.8–3.9	30.9		data · 2007 RS_{1}
2007-10-12	2007-10-11	2007 TX_{22}	0.000969 AU (145,000 km; 90,100 mi)	0.377	5.6–12	28.4		data · 2007 TX_{22}
2007-10-17	2007-10-21	2007 UO_{6}	0.00245 AU (367,000 km; 228,000 mi)	0.955	9.2–21	27.3	Yes	data · 2007 UO_{6}
2007-10-17	2007-10-21	2007 UN_{12}	0.000466 AU (69,700 km; 43,300 mi)	0.181	4.8–11	28.7		data · 2007 UN_{12}
2007-10-18	2007-10-20	2007 UD_{6}	0.00128 AU (191,000 km; 119,000 mi)	0.499	5.8–13	28.3		data · 2007 UD_{6}
2007-10-30	2007-10-31	2007 US_{51}	0.00149 AU (223,000 km; 139,000 mi)	0.582	9.7–22	27.2		data · 2007 US_{51}
2007-11-14	2007-11-12	2007 VF_{189}	0.00156 AU (233,000 km; 145,000 mi)	0.608	5.8–13	28.3		data · 2007 VF_{189}
2007-12-13	2007-12-14	2007 XB_{23}	0.000665 AU (99,500 km; 61,800 mi)	0.259	10–23	27.1		data · 2007 XB_{23}
2007-12-27	2007-12-30	2007 YP_{56}	0.00138 AU (206,000 km; 128,000 mi)	0.539	18–41	25.8		data · 2007 YP_{56}

=== Warning times by size ===
This table visualizes the warning times of the close approaches listed in the above table, depending on the size of the asteroid. The sizes of each pie chart show the relative sizes of the asteroids to scale. For comparison, the approximate size of a person is also shown. This is based around the absolute magnitude of each asteroid, an approximate measure of size based on brightness.

Absolute magnitude H ≥ 30 (smallest)

Silhouette of man standing and facing forward

(size of a person for comparison)

Absolute magnitude 30 > H ≥ 29

Absolute magnitude 29 > H ≥ 28

Absolute magnitude 28 > H ≥ 27

Absolute magnitude 27 > H ≥ 26

Absolute magnitude 26 > H ≥ 25

Absolute magnitude 25 > H (largest)

- After closest approach: 1 (100.0%)
- < 24 hours before: 0 (0.0%)
- up to 7 days before: 0 (0.0%)
- > one week before: 0 (0.0%)
- > 7 weeks before: 0 (0.0%)
- > one year before: 0 (0.0%)

== See also ==
- List of asteroid close approaches to Earth
- List of asteroid close approaches to Earth in 2008
