= List of asteroid close approaches to Earth in 2008 =

- Asteroids which came closer to Earth than the Moon in 2008 by time of discovery
- After closest approach: 11 (55.0%)
- < 24 hours before: 1 (5.0%)
- up to 7 days before: 8 (40.0%)
- > one week before: 0 (0.0%)
- > 7 weeks before: 0 (0.0%)
- > one year before: 0 (0.0%)
Other years

Below is the list of asteroid close approaches to Earth in 2008.

== Timeline of close approaches less than one lunar distance from Earth in 2008 ==
A list of known near-Earth asteroid close approaches less than 1 lunar distance (384,400 km or 0.00257 AU) from Earth in 2008, based on the close approach database of the Center for Near-Earth Object Studies (CNEOS).

The CNEOS database of close approaches lists some close approaches a full orbit or more before the discovery of the object, derived by orbit calculation. The list below only includes close approaches that are evidenced by observations, thus the pre-discovery close approaches would only be included if the object was found by precovery, but there was no such close approach in 2008.

This list and the relevant databases do not consider impacts on Earth as close approaches. The impact of 2008 TC3 was the first successfully predicted asteroid impact, while the impact of several small asteroids in Earth's atmosphere were observed visually or recorded by sensors designed to detect the detonation of nuclear devices as bolides.

Rows highlighted red indicate objects which were not discovered until after closest approach

Rows highlighted yellow indicate objects discovered less than 24 hours before closest approach

Rows highlighted green indicate objects discovered more than one week before closest approach

Rows highlighted turquoise indicate objects discovered more than 7 weeks before closest approach

Rows highlighted blue indicate objects discovered more than one year before closest approach
(i.e. objects successfully cataloged on a previous orbit, rather than being detected during final approach)

Date of closest approach	Date discovered	Object	Nominal geocentric distance (AU) (Note: Distance from the center of Earth to the center of the object. See the NASA/JPL Solar System Dynamics Glossary: Geocentric. Earth has a radius of approximately 6,400 km.)	Nominal geocentric distance (LD)	Size (m) (approximate)	(H) (abs. mag.)	Closer approach to Moon	Refs
2008-01-13	2008-01-10	2008 AF_{3}	0.00252 AU (377,000 km; 234,000 mi)	0.98	16–36	26.1		data · 2008 AF_{3}
2008-01-16	2008-01-19	2008 BW_{2}	0.00238 AU (356,000 km; 221,000 mi)	0.93	3.1–6.8	29.7		data · 2008 BW_{2}
2008-01-31	2008-01-30	2008 BC_{15}	0.00198 AU (296,000 km; 184,000 mi)	0.77	13–28	26.6	Yes	data · 2008 BC_{15}
2008-02-05	2008-02-03	2008 CT_{1}	0.000887 AU (132,700 km; 82,500 mi)	0.35	7.7–17	27.7		data · 2008 CT_{1}
2008-02-15	2008-02-09	2008 CK70	0.00248 AU (371,000 km; 231,000 mi)	0.97	28–62	24.9		data · 2008 CK_{70}
2008-03-09	2008-03-07	2008 EZ_{7}	0.00108 AU (162,000 km; 100,000 mi)	0.42	11–24	27.0		data · 2008 EZ_{7}
2008-03-10	2008-03-11	2008 EF_{32}	0.000442 AU (66,100 km; 41,100 mi)	0.17	3.5–7.8	29.4		data · 2008 EF_{32}
2008-03-10	2008-03-08	2008 EM_{68}	0.00149 AU (223,000 km; 139,000 mi)	0.58	8.4–19	27.5		data · 2008 EM_{68}
2008-03-23	2008-03-27	2008 FK	0.00217 AU (325,000 km; 202,000 mi)	0.84	9.2–21	27.3	Yes	data · 2008 FK
2008-03-29	2008-03-28	2008 FP	0.00114 AU (171,000 km; 106,000 mi)	0.44	15–33	26.3		data · 2008 FP
2008-04-03	2008-04-06	2008 GM_{2}	0.00139 AU (208,000 km; 129,000 mi)	0.54	5.8–13	28.3		data · 2008 GM_{2}
2008-04-07	2008-04-05	2008 GF_{1}	0.00196 AU (293,000 km; 182,000 mi)	0.76	5.8–13	28.3	Yes	data · 2008 GF_{1}
2008-05-10	2008-05-11	2008 JL_{24}	0.00115 AU (172,000 km; 107,000 mi)	0.45	3.2–7.1	29.6	Yes	data · 2008 JL_{24}
2008-07-29	2008-07-30	2008 OT_{7}	0.00116 AU (174,000 km; 108,000 mi)	0.45	10–23	27.1		data · 2008 OT_{7}
2008-10-03	2008-10-08	2008 TN_{9}	0.00165 AU (247,000 km; 153,000 mi)	0.64	7.3–16	27.8		data · 2008 TN_{9}
2008-10-09	2008-10-09	2008 TS26	0.0000845 AU (12,640 km; 7,850 mi)	0.03	0.61–1.4	33.2		data · 2008 TS_{26}
2008-10-18	2008-10-29	2008 UA_{202}	0.00223 AU (334,000 km; 207,000 mi)	0.87	3.5–7.8	29.4		data · 2008 UA_{202}
2008-10-20	2008-10-21	2008 US	0.000220 AU (32,900 km; 20,500 mi)	0.09	1.4–3.1	31.4		data · 2008 US
2008-10-22	2008-10-22	2008 UM_{1}	0.000572 AU (85,600 km; 53,200 mi)	0.22	1.0–2.3	32.1		data · 2008 UM_{1}
2008-11-03	2008-11-03	2008 VM	0.000309 AU (46,200 km; 28,700 mi)	0.12	2.4–5.4	30.2		data · 2008 VM

=== Warning times by size ===
This table visualizes the warning times of the close approaches listed in the above table, depending on the size of the asteroid. The sizes of each pie chart show the relative sizes of the asteroids to scale. For comparison, the approximate size of a person is also shown. This is based around the absolute magnitude of each asteroid, an approximate measure of size based on brightness.

Absolute magnitude H ≥ 30 (smallest)

Silhouette of man standing and facing forward

(size of a person for comparison)

Absolute magnitude 30 > H ≥ 29

Absolute magnitude 29 > H ≥ 28

Absolute magnitude 28 > H ≥ 27

Absolute magnitude 27 > H ≥ 26

Absolute magnitude 26 > H ≥ 25

None

Absolute magnitude 25 > H (largest)

- After closest approach: 0 (0.0%)
- < 24 hours before: 0 (0.0%)
- up to 7 days before: 1 (100.0%)
- > one week before: 0 (0.0%)
- > 7 weeks before: 0 (0.0%)
- > one year before: 0 (0.0%)

== Additional examples ==
An example list of near-Earth asteroids that passed more than 1 lunar distance (384,400 km or 0.00256 AU) from Earth in 2008.

- 2007 TU24 (~250 meters in diameter) passed 1.44 LD (554,000 km) from Earth on January 29, 2008.
- 2008 CE_{22} (~18 meters in diameter) passed between 0.9997 and 1.0023 LD (384,300 to 385,300 km) from Earth on February 6, 2008.
- (450894) 2008 BT18 (~650 meters in diameter) passed 5.9 LD (2.3 million km) from Earth on July 14, 2008.
- 2008 XK (~12 meters in diameter) may have passed as close as 0.23 LD (89,300 km) from Earth on December 5, 2008, but the nominal orbit suggests it passed nearer to 1.46 LD (560,500 km) from Earth instead.

== See also ==
- List of asteroid close approaches to Earth
- List of asteroid close approaches to Earth in 2000-2007
- List of asteroid close approaches to Earth in 2009
