= (214869) 2007 PA8 =

Asteroid

(214869) 2007 PA_{8}
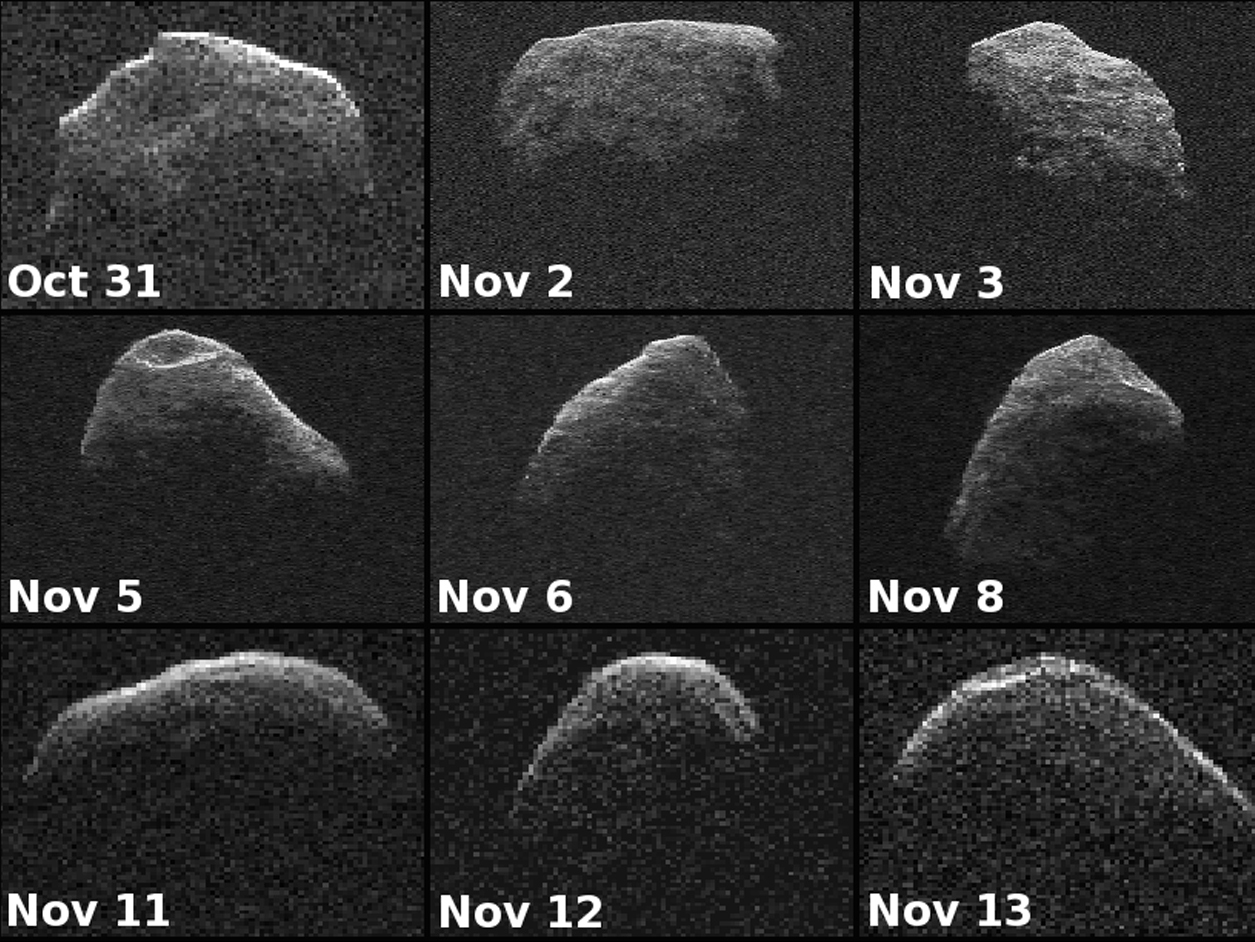
- Goldstone radar image of 2007 PA_{8} during its 2012 close approach

Discovery
- Discovered by: LINEAR
- Discovery site: Lincoln Lab's ETS
- Discovery date: 9 August 2007

Designations
- Minor planet category: Apollo · NEO · PHA

Orbital characteristics
- Epoch 4 September 2017 (JD 2458000.5)
- Uncertainty parameter 0
- Observation arc: 10.83 yr (3,957 days)
- Aphelion: 4.6931 AU
- Perihelion: 0.9571 AU
- Semi-major axis: 2.8251 AU
- Eccentricity: 0.6612
- Orbital period (sidereal): 4.75 yr (1,734 days)
- Mean anomaly: 1.4149°
- Mean motion: 0° 12^{m} 27.36^{s} / day
- Inclination: 1.9841°
- Longitude of ascending node: 142.63°
- Argument of perihelion: 292.33°
- Earth MOID: 0.0246 AU (9.6 LD)
- Jupiter MOID: 0.6318 AU

Physical characteristics
- Mean diameter: 1.35±0.07 km 1.38 km (calculated); 1.4±0.2 km
- Synodic rotation period: 85±12 h 95±5 h 101.209 h 101.325±1.2659 h 102.24±0.48 h
- Geometric albedo: 0.20 (assumed); 0.29±0.08; 0.29±0.14
- Spectral type: C · Q · S B–V = 0.765±0.022; V–R = 0.415±0.011; V–I = 0.741±0.015
- Absolute magnitude (H): 16.2 · 16.216±0.002 (R-band) · 16.30±0.52 · 16.4 · 16.47 · 16.67

(214869) 2007 PA_{8} is an asteroid and slow rotator, classified as a near-Earth object and potentially hazardous asteroid of the Apollo group, approximately 1.4 kilometers in diameter.

It came within 6.5 million km (4 million miles, 17 lunar distances) of Earth on 5 November 2012.

It was discovered on 9 August 2007, by the Lincoln Near-Earth Asteroid Research team (LINEAR) at the U.S. Lincoln Laboratory Experimental Test Site in Socorro, New Mexico.

It was studied by the 70-meter (230 ft) Goldstone Deep Space Network antenna as it came near Earth, which resulted in radar images and other data about the asteroid, such as its very long rotation period of approximately 100 hours.

2007 PA_{8} may be a dormant comet related to the November γ Pegasids meteor shower.

== Numbering and naming ==
This minor planet was numbered by the Minor Planet Center on 9 May 2009. As of 2018, it has not been named.

== See also ==
- List of asteroid close approaches to Earth
