= 2009 DD45 =

Near-Earth asteroid

2009 DD_{45}
- 2009 DD_{45}: orbital animation of its 2009-flyby

Discovery
- Discovered by: SSS
- Discovery site: Siding Spring Obs.
- Discovery date: 27 February 2009

Designations
- Minor planet category: NEO · Apollo

Orbital characteristics
- Epoch 21 November 2025 (JD 2461000.5)
- Uncertainty parameter 4 · 2
- Observation arc: 7 days
- Aphelion: 1.4951 AU
- Perihelion: 0.9867 AU
- Semi-major axis: 1.2409 AU
- Eccentricity: 0.2048
- Orbital period (sidereal): 1.38 yr (505 d)
- Mean anomaly: 25.653°
- Mean motion: 0° 42^{m} 46.8^{s} / day
- Inclination: 13.744°
- Longitude of ascending node: 161.89°
- Argument of perihelion: 13.972°
- Earth MOID: 0.000385 AU (0.150 LD)

Physical characteristics
- Mean diameter: 19±4 m (est. at 0.36)
- Synodic rotation period: 1.2 h (poor)
- Geometric albedo: 0.36 (est.)
- Spectral type: SMASS = S
- Absolute magnitude (H): 25.8

2009 DD_{45} is a very small Apollo asteroid that passed near Earth at an altitude of 63,500 km (39,500 mi) on 2 March 2009 at 13:44 UTC. It was discovered by Australian astronomers with the Siding Spring Survey at the Siding Spring Observatory on 27 February 2009, only three days before its closest approach to the Earth. Its estimated diameter is between 15 and 23 metres. This is about the same size as a hypothetical object that could have caused the Tunguska event in 1908.

BBC News Online cites the minimum distance as 72,000 km (45,000 mi) (about 1/5 lunar distances). 2009 DD_{45} passed farther away (40 thousand miles versus 4 thousand miles) but was substantially larger than 2004 FU162, a small asteroid about 6 m (20 ft) across which came within about 6,500 km (4,000 mi) in 2004, and is more similar in size to 2004 FH. With an observation arc of 7 days and an uncertainty parameter of 4, the asteroid will make its next close encounter with Earth on 29 February 2056 and then potentially around 3 March 2067.

== See also ==
- List of asteroid close approaches to Earth in 2009
