= 2021 SG =

Near-Earth asteroid

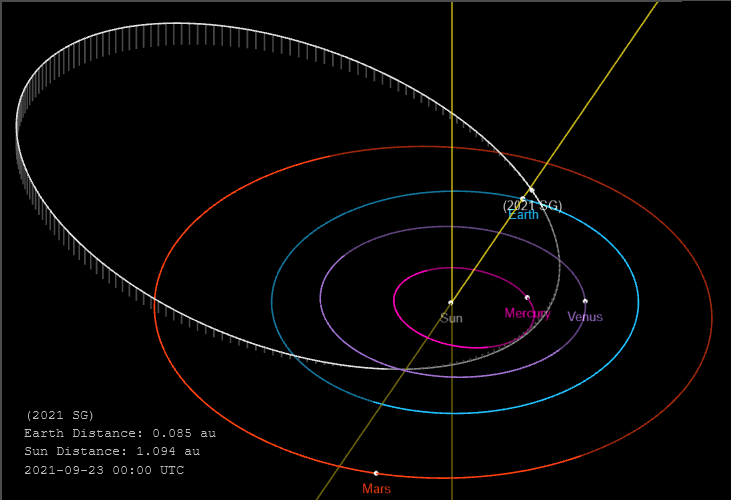
- Orbit of 2021 SG

Discovery
- Discovered by: Zwicky Transient Facility
- Discovery site: Palomar Obs.
- Discovery date: 17 September 2020

Designations
- Alternative designations: ZTF0MtF
- Minor planet category: NEO · Apollo

Orbital characteristics
- Epoch 21 January 2022 (JD 2459600.5)
- Uncertainty parameter 7
- Observation arc: 7 days
- Aphelion: 2.953 AU
- Perihelion: 0.4730 AU
- Semi-major axis: 1.713 AU
- Eccentricity: 0.7238
- Orbital period (sidereal): 2.24 yr (818.77 days)
- Mean anomaly: 76.606°
- Mean motion: 0° 26^{m} 22.869^{s} / day
- Inclination: 3.176°
- Longitude of ascending node: 352.203°
- Argument of perihelion: 256.579°
- Earth MOID: 0.00157 AU (235,000 km)

Physical characteristics
- Mean diameter: 42–94 m
- Apparent magnitude: 13.4 (discovery)
- Absolute magnitude (H): 24.01±0.24

2021 SG is a near-Earth asteroid, with an estimated diameter of 42 to 94 meters, that passed about half a lunar distance from Earth on 16 September 2021. It approached from the direction of the Sun, so it was invisible until a day later. It completes its highly eccentric orbit in 2.24 years. 2021 SG is an Apollo asteroid with a 1.71 AU semi-major axis, and a 0.473 AU perihelion (near Mercury at perihelion) out to a 2.95 AU aphelion (between Mars and Jupiter). With an absolute magnitude (H) of 24.0, it is possibly the largest asteroid to pass within 1 lunar distance of Earth during 2021.
