= 1991 BA =

Small risk–listed near-Earth asteroid

Discovery
- Discovered by: Spacewatch
- Discovery site: Kitt Peak Obs.
- Discovery date: 18 January 1991

Designations
- Minor planet category: Apollo · NEO

Orbital characteristics
- Epoch 18 January 1991 (JD 2448274.5)
- Uncertainty parameter 9
- Observation arc: 4.6 hours
- Aphelion: 3.662±0.430 AU
- Perihelion: 0.7153±0.0122 AU
- Semi-major axis: 2.189±0.257 AU
- Eccentricity: 0.6732±0.0440
- Orbital period (sidereal): 3.24±0.57 yr (1,183±208 days)
- Mean anomaly: 346.836°±2.609°
- Mean motion: 0° 18^{m} 15.655^{s} / day
- Inclination: 1.938°±0.104°
- Longitude of ascending node: 118.880°±0.012°
- Argument of perihelion: 70.688°±0.260°
- Earth MOID: 0.0003 AU · 0.1 LD

Physical characteristics
- Dimensions: 5–10 m
- Absolute magnitude (H): 28.6

1991 BA is a sub-kilometer asteroid, classified as near-Earth object of the Apollo group that was first observed by Spacewatch on 18 January 1991, and passed within 160,000 km (99,000 mi) of Earth. This is a little less than half the distance to the Moon. With a 5-hour observation arc the asteroid has a poorly constrained orbit and is considered lost. It could be a member of the Beta Taurids.

== Description ==
1991 BA is approximately 5 to 10 meters (16 to 33 ft) in diameter and is listed on the Sentry Risk Table. It follows a highly eccentric (0.68), low-inclination (2.0°) orbit of 3.3 years duration, ranging between 0.71 and 3.7 AU from the Sun. 1991 BA was, at the time of its discovery, the smallest and closest confirmed asteroid outside of Earth's atmosphere. 1991 BA is too faint to be observed except during close approaches to Earth and is considered lost.

== Possible impact ==
The asteroid has a very short 5-hour observation arc that makes future predictions of its position unreliable. Virtual clones of the asteroid that fit the uncertainty region in the known trajectory use to show a 1 in 290,000 chance that the asteroid could impact Earth on 2023 January 18. It is estimated that an impact would produce an upper atmosphere air burst equivalent to 16 kt TNT, roughly equal to Nagasaki's Fat Man. The asteroid would appear as a bright fireball and fragment in the air burst into smaller pieces that would hit the ground at terminal velocity producing a meteorite strewn field. Impacts of objects this size are estimated to occur approximately once a year. Asteroid 2008 TC3 was an object of similar size that was discovered less than a day before its impact on Earth on October 7, 2008, and produced a fireball and meteorite strewn field in the Sudan. The 18 January 2023 virtual impactor did not occur.

Virtual impactor
| Date | Impact probability (1 in) | JPL Horizons nominal geocentric distance (AU) | NEODyS nominal geocentric distance (AU) | MPC nominal geocentric distance (AU) | Find_Orb nominal geocentric distance (AU) | uncertainty region (3-sigma) |
|---|---|---|---|---|---|---|
| 2023-01-18 | 290000 | 3.9 AU (580 million km) | 3.9 AU (580 million km) | 2.4 AU (360 million km) | 2.8 AU (420 million km) | ± 841 million km |

There is a 1 in a million chance of impacting Earth on 19 January 2114.
