= 2018 CB =

Near-Earth micro-asteroid

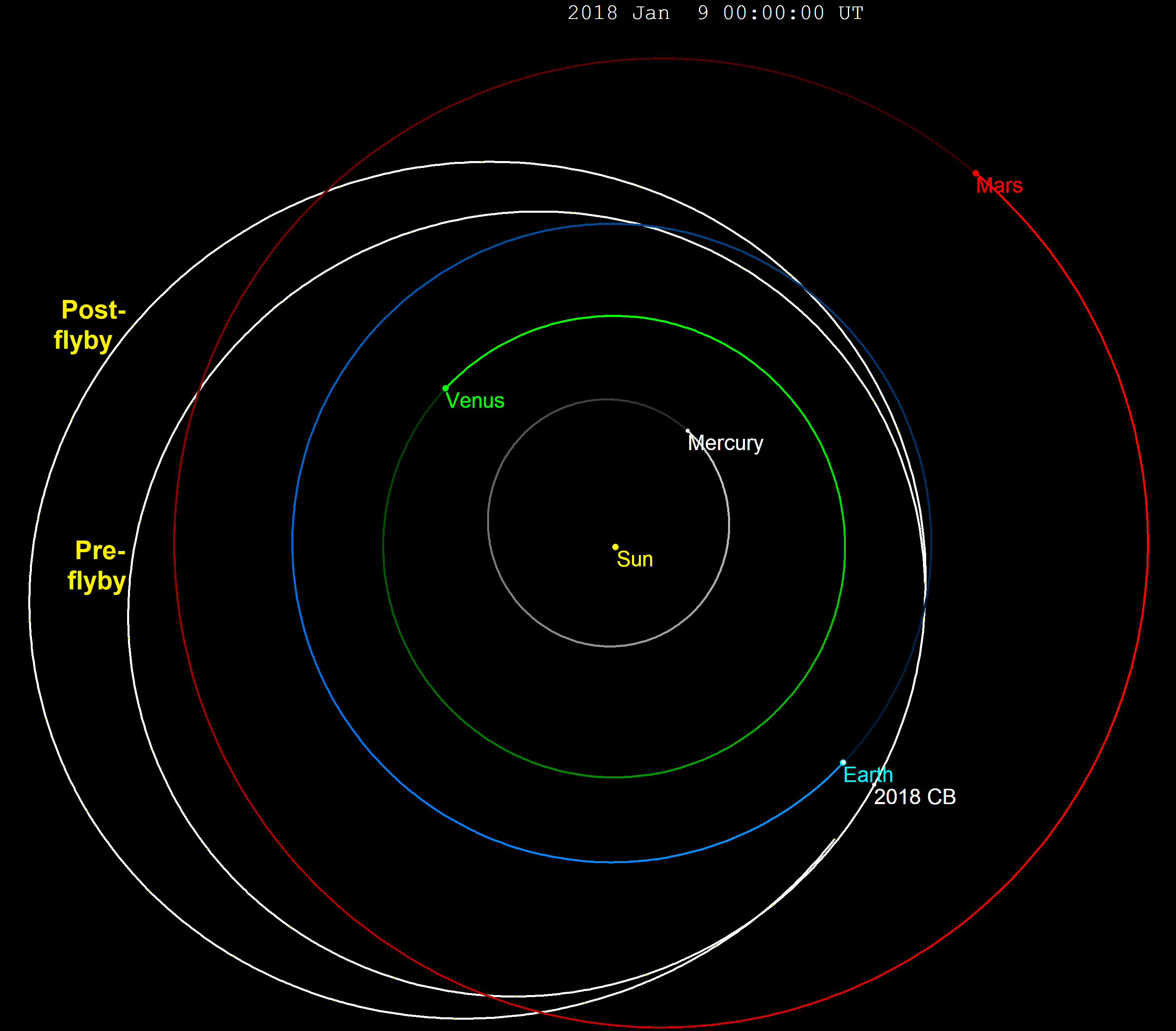
- Highly elliptical orbit of 2018 CB, crossing those of both Mars and Earth. Positions shown for 1 January 2018, before flyby.

Discovery
- Discovered by: CSS
- Discovery site: Mount Lemmon Obs.
- Discovery date: 4 February 2018 (first observed only)

Designations
- Minor planet category: NEO · Apollo; Earth- and Mars crosser

Orbital characteristics
- Epoch 23 March 2018 (JD 2458200.5)
- Uncertainty parameter 2
- Observation arc: 5 days
- Aphelion: 1.8589 AU
- Perihelion: 0.9582 AU
- Semi-major axis: 1.4085 AU
- Eccentricity: 0.3197
- Orbital period (sidereal): 1.67 yr (611 days)
- Mean anomaly: 10.249°
- Mean motion: 0° 35^{m} 22.56^{s} / day
- Inclination: 5.3027°
- Longitude of ascending node: 320.79°
- Argument of perihelion: 208.11°
- Earth MOID: 0.0004 AU (0.2 LD)

Physical characteristics
- Mean diameter: 7 m (assumed); 20 m (upper limit)
- Geometric albedo: >0.18; ~1 (assumed)
- Absolute magnitude (H): 26.0

2018 CB is a very bright micro-asteroid, classified as a near-Earth object of the Apollo group, less than 20 meters (66 ft) in diameter. It was first observed by astronomers of the Catalina Sky Survey at Mount Lemmon Observatory, Arizona, on 4 February 2018, during its sub-lunar close encounter with Earth.

== 2018 flyby ==
On 9 February 2018, the asteroid passed about 64,500 km (40,100 mi) from Earth, traveling 10 miles per second (16 km/s) relative to Earth and briefly reaching apparent magnitude 13. It was observed by the Goldstone Observatory, which constrained its size to no more than 20 meters.

During the flyby its period was changed from 1.48 years to 1.67 years.

=== Flyby gallery ===
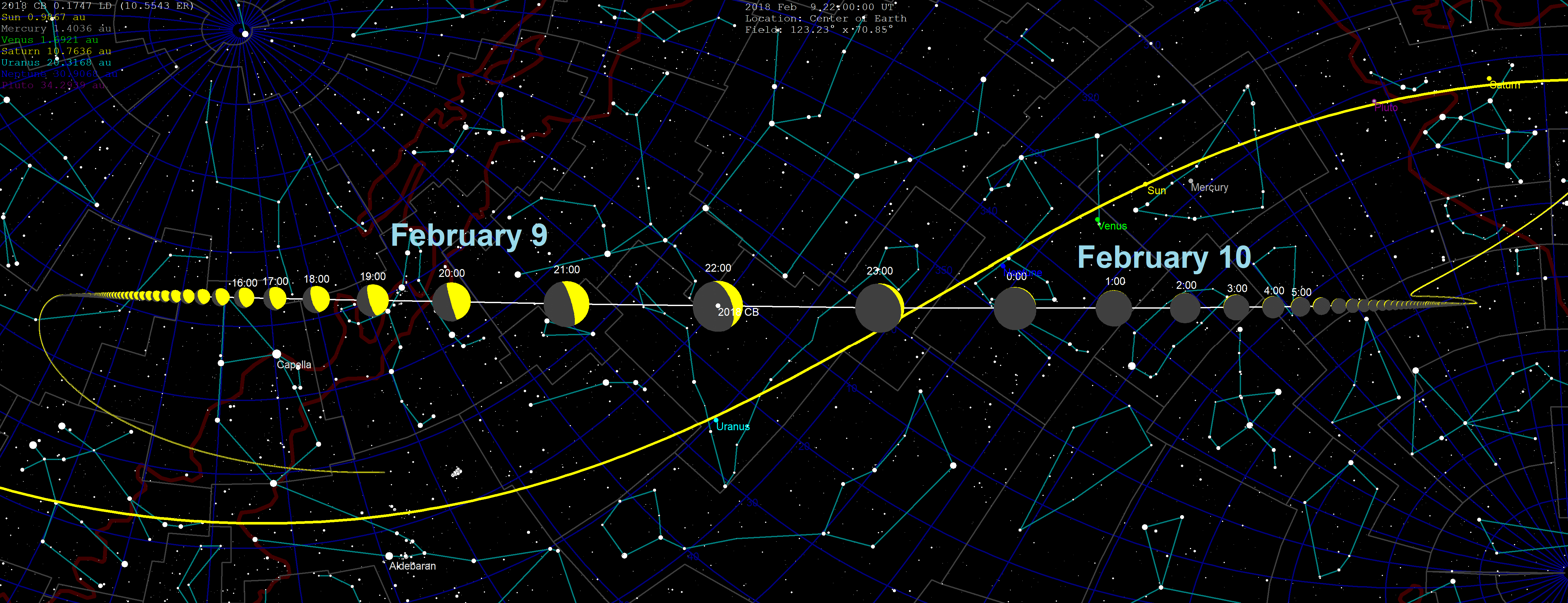
Its path across the sky on February 9 was north to south (30 minute positions shown)

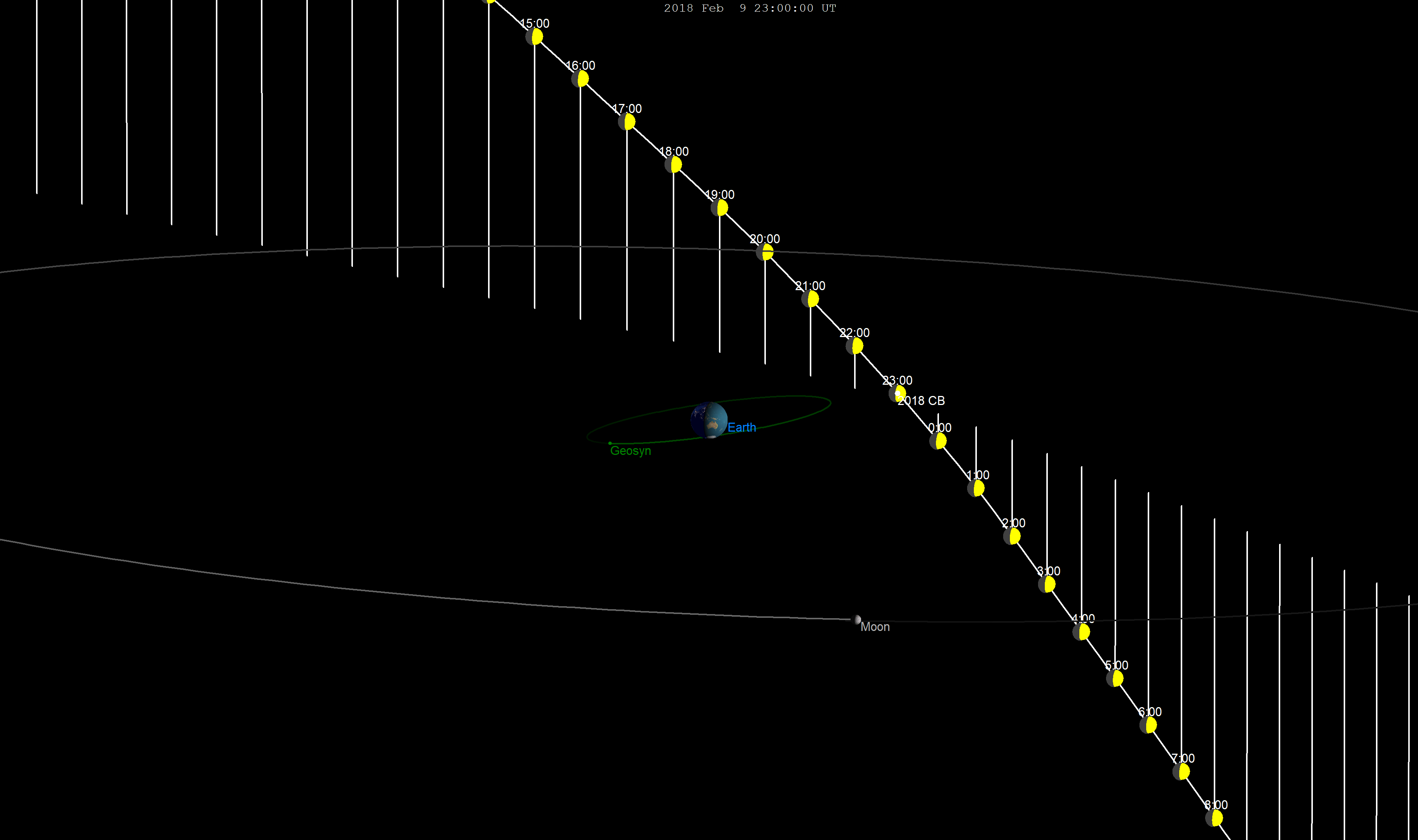
Seen from space, it passes just outside geosynchronous orbit

20 minute timelapse, taken two days before closest approach. The asteroid can be seen near the center of the image, moving towards the lower left. Brightness is inverted (stars appear dark, the sky background appears light).

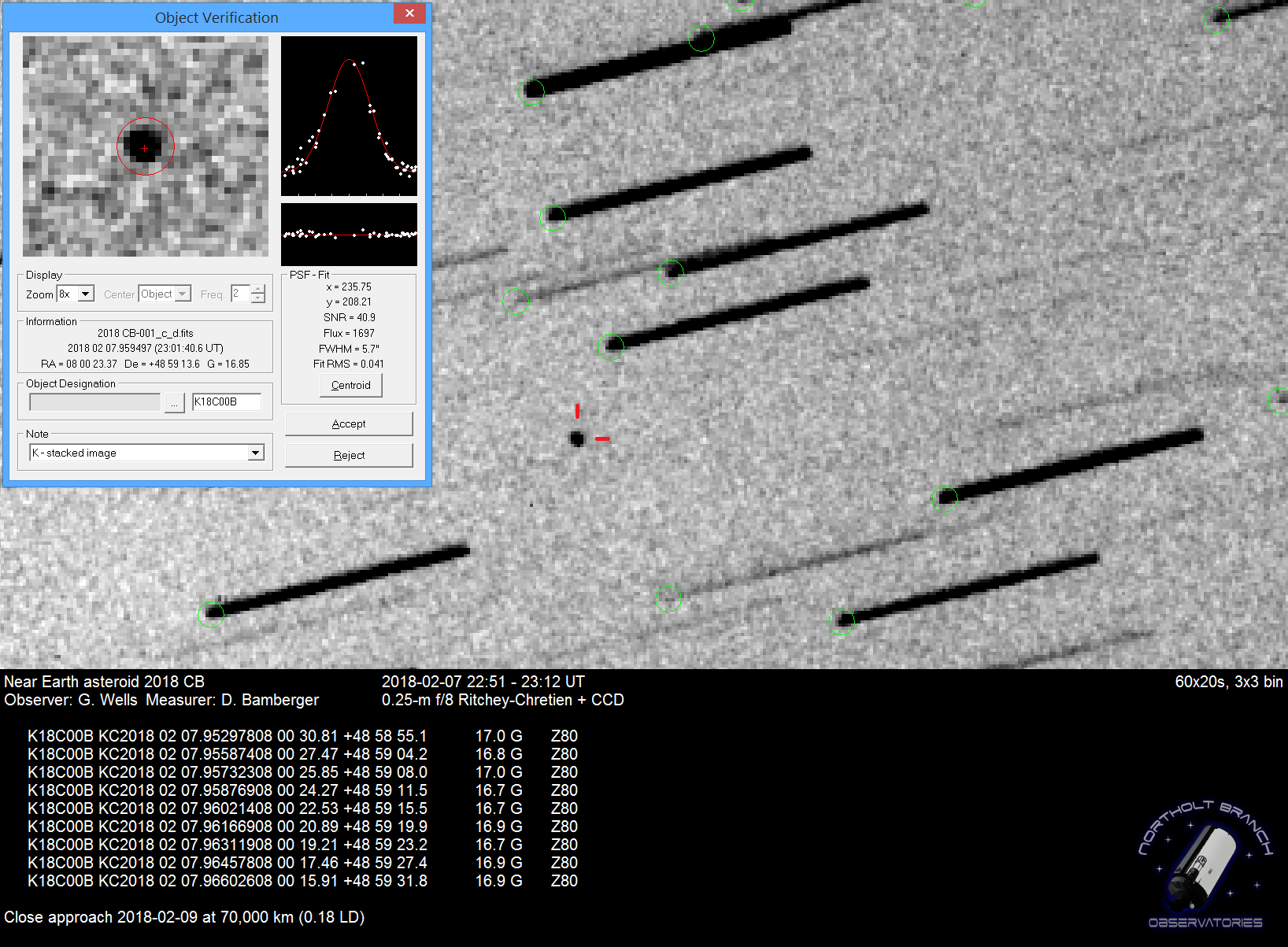
2018 CB on February 7. The image is corrected for the asteroid's motion, so stars appear trailed.

== Other flybys ==
2018 CB's orbit is in Earth's neighborhood, so it frequently makes other close approaches to Earth like the 2018 one, although not usually as close. In 1953 (65 years or 44 orbits earlier), it passed 0.00650 AU (972,000 km; 604,000 mi) from Earth, and in 2090 it will pass between 0.00475 AU (711,000 km; 442,000 mi) and 0.00798 AU (1,194,000 km; 742,000 mi) from Earth.

It also may have passed similarly near Earth in 1914, but the uncertainty in the 1953 approach makes it difficult to determine.

== Physical characteristics ==
2018 CB appears unusually bright for its size, suggesting it is made of brighter materials than the average asteroid.

== See also ==
- List of asteroid close approaches to Earth in 2018
