= 2017 QP1 =

Near-Earth micro-asteroid

2017 QP_{1}
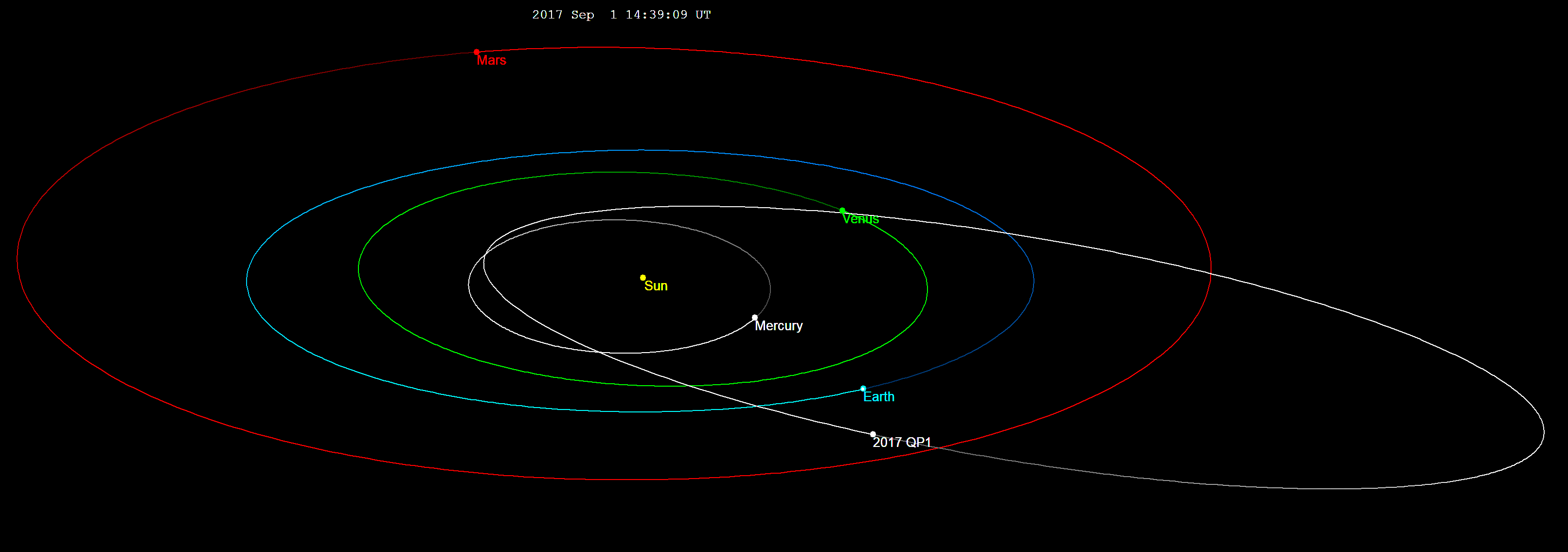
- The orbit of 2017 QP_{1} and positions after flyby on 1 September 2017

Discovery
- Discovered by: ATLAS
- Discovery site: Haleakala Obs.
- Discovery date: 14 August 2017

Designations
- Minor planet category: Apollo · NEO

Orbital characteristics
- Epoch 18 August 2017 (JD 2457983.5)
- Uncertainty parameter 9
- Observation arc: (3 days)
- Aphelion: 2.3330 AU
- Perihelion: 0.4033 AU
- Semi-major axis: 1.3681 AU
- Eccentricity: 0.7052
- Orbital period (sidereal): 1.60 yr (585 days)
- Mean anomaly: 32.740°
- Mean motion: 0° 36^{m} 57.24^{s} / day
- Inclination: 8.1426°
- Longitude of ascending node: 141.88°
- Argument of perihelion: 63.069°
- Earth MOID: 0.000396 AU (0.154 LD)

Physical characteristics
- Mean diameter: 37–83 meters
- Absolute magnitude (H): 24.266

2017 QP_{1} is a micro-asteroid on an eccentric orbit, classified as a near-Earth object of the Apollo group that made a close approach of 0.17 lunar distances from Earth on 14 August 2017 at 21:23 UTC. It was first observed by ATLAS at Haleakala Observatory, Hawaii, on 16 August 2017, two days after its closest approach. The asteroid is estimated to measure between 37 and 83 meters in diameter. It flew past Earth at a speed of 23.97 km/s under the south pole of the Earth.

The orbit of 2017 QP_{1} is extremely eccentric, going from the orbit of planet Mercury out into the asteroid belt, located between Mars and Jupiter.

== Gallery ==
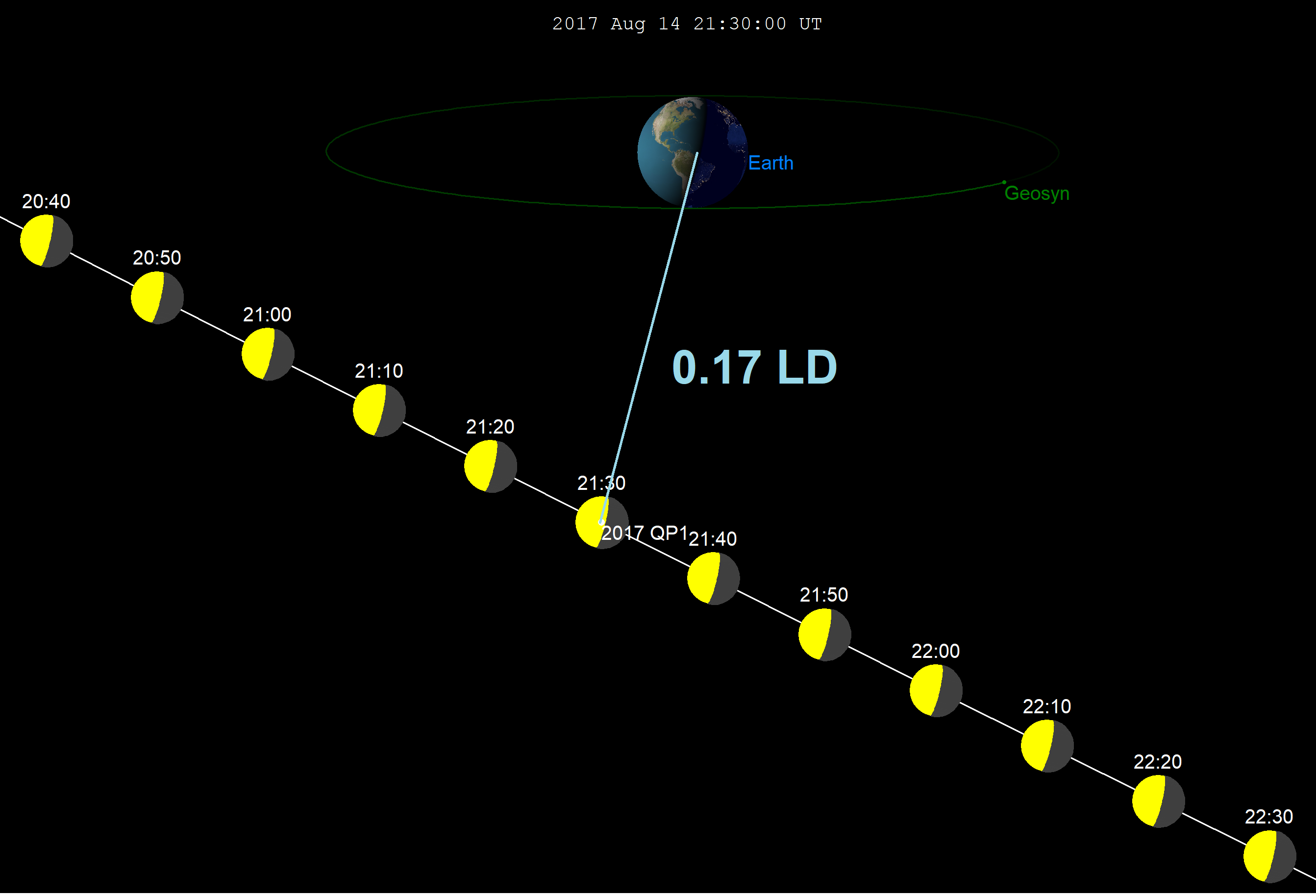
Trajectory inside the lunar orbit

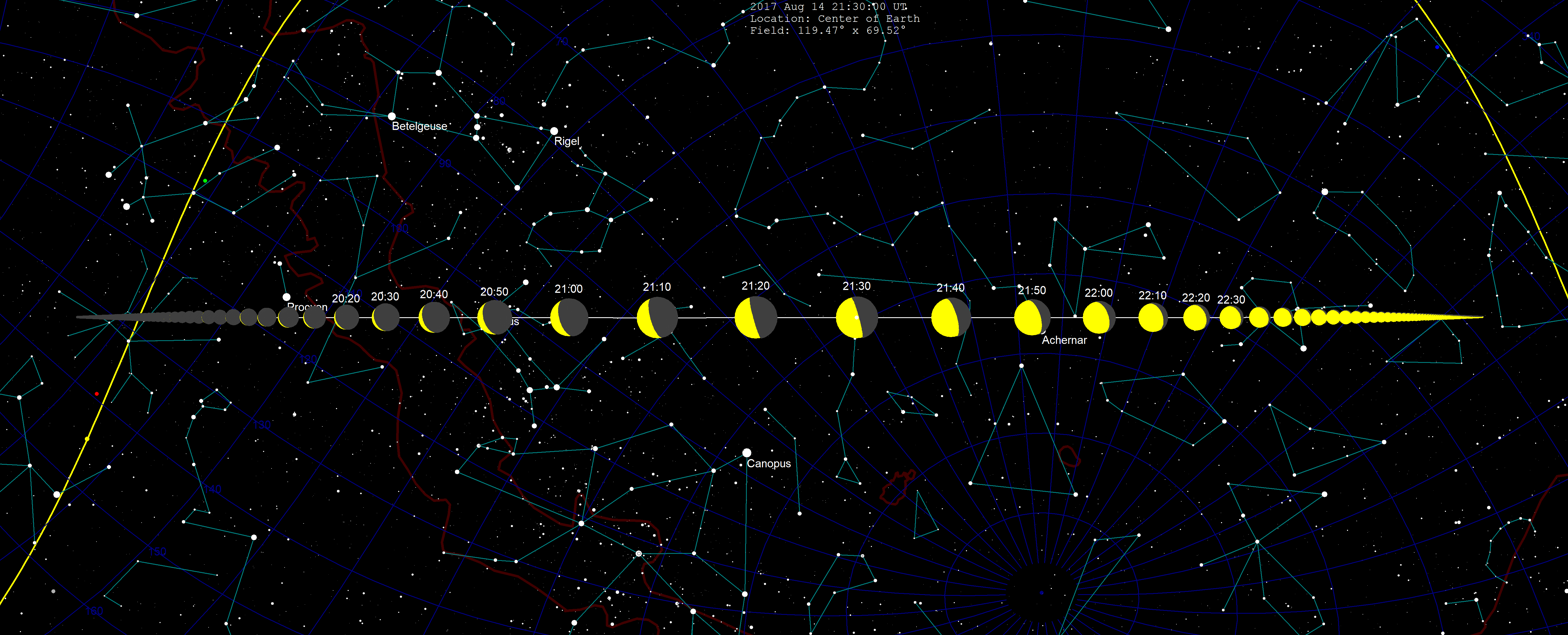
2017 QP_{1}'s path in the sky during flyby, seen from the center of the Earth
