= 2022 FD1 =

Near-Earth asteroid

2022 FD_{1}
Discovery
- Discovered by: K. Sárneczky
- Discovery site: Piszkéstető Stn.
- Discovery date: 24 March 2022

Designations
- Alternative designations: Sar2594
- Minor planet category: NEO · Apollo

Orbital characteristics
- Epoch 21 January 2022 (JD 2459600.5)
- Uncertainty parameter 6
- Observation arc: 8.4 hours
- Aphelion: 2.653 AU
- Perihelion: 0.719 AU
- Semi-major axis: 1.686 AU
- Eccentricity: 0.5735
- Orbital period (sidereal): 2.19 yr (800 days)
- Mean anomaly: 309.949°
- Mean motion: 0° 27^{m} 0.765^{s} / day
- Inclination: 9.446°
- Longitude of ascending node: 4.374°
- Argument of perihelion: 256.448°
- Earth MOID: 0.000168 AU (25,100 km)
- Jupiter MOID: 2.51 AU

Physical characteristics
- Mean diameter: 2–4 m
- Absolute magnitude (H): 31.02±0.28

2022 FD_{1} is a small, metre-sized Apollo near-Earth asteroid that was eclipsed by Earth and made its closest approach 8,470 km (5,260 mi) from Earth's surface on 25 March 2022. (Note: Earth has a radius of 6,371 km and 2022 FD_{1} nominally passed about 14,845+8 −7 km from the center of Earth. The asteroid's distance from Earth's surface at closest approach is the difference between the asteroid closest approach radius and Earth's radius. (14,845 – 6,371 = 8,474)) It entered Earth's shadow at 8:10 UTC and became invisible until egress at 8:45 UTC. Its brightness from Earth reached a peak apparent magnitude of 13 shortly before closest approach at 09:13 UTC. By that time, the asteroid was moving at a speed of 18.5 km/s (11.5 mi/s) relative to Earth and was located in the far Southern Hemisphere sky.

2022 FD_{1} was discovered on 24 March 2022, by astronomer Krisztián Sárneczky at Konkoly Observatory's Piszkéstető Station in Budapest, Hungary. It was his next near-Earth asteroid discovery after the impactor 2022 EB5 from early March 2022.

Animation of 2022 FD1 around Sun Sun · Earth · 2022 FD1

Orbital Elements
Parameter	Epoch	Period (p)	Aphelion (Q)	Perihelion (q)	Semi-major axis (a)	Eccentricity (e)	Inclination (i)
Units		(days)	AU				(°)
Pre-flyby	2021 March 13	928	2.863	0.790	1.863	0.567	9.440
Post-flyby	2022-Dec-17	795	2.610	0.751	1.681	0.553	4.490
