= (549948) 2011 WL2 =

Near-Earth asteroid

(549948) 2011 WL_{2}
Discovery
- Discovered by: LINEAR
- Discovery site: Lincoln Laboratory ETS
- Discovery date: 16 November 2011

Designations
- Minor planet category: Apollo NEO, PHA

Orbital characteristics
- Epoch 13 January 2016 (JD 2457400.5)
- Uncertainty parameter 2
- Observation arc: 386 days (1.06 yr)
- Aphelion: 1.3833510 AU (206.94636 Gm)
- Perihelion: 0.7723798 AU (115.54637 Gm)
- Semi-major axis: 1.0778654 AU (161.24637 Gm)
- Eccentricity: 0.283417
- Orbital period (sidereal): 1.12 yr (408.74 d)
- Average orbital speed: 28.10406 km/s
- Mean anomaly: 336.9187°
- Mean motion: 0° 52^{m} 50.734^{s} /day
- Inclination: 14.12974°
- Longitude of ascending node: 212.9462°
- Argument of perihelion: 88.83006°
- Earth MOID: 0.00141998 AU (212,426 km)
- Jupiter MOID: 3.83997 AU (574.451 Gm)

Physical characteristics
- Mean diameter: 190–420 m
- Absolute magnitude (H): 20.8

(549948) 2011 WL_{2} is a sub-kilometer asteroid, classified as a near-Earth object and potentially hazardous asteroid of the Apollo group. It was discovered on 16 November 2011, by astronomers with the LINEAR at the Lincoln Laboratory ETS near Socorro, New Mexico, in the United States.

== Orbit ==
2011 WL_{2} is a potentially hazardous asteroid (PHA), but has a well determined orbit with a 10 year observation arc. 2011 WL_{2} will pass at a distance of 0.0056 AU (840,000 km; 520,000 mi) from Earth on 25 October 2077. For comparison, the distance to the Moon is about 0.0026 AU (384,400 km). 2011 WL_{2} appears on the list of PHA close approaches issued by the Minor Planet Center (MPC), with the next close approach in the year 2038.

The Jupiter Tisserand invariant, used to distinguish different kinds of orbits, is 5.7.
