= 2011 MD =

Asteroid in the solar system

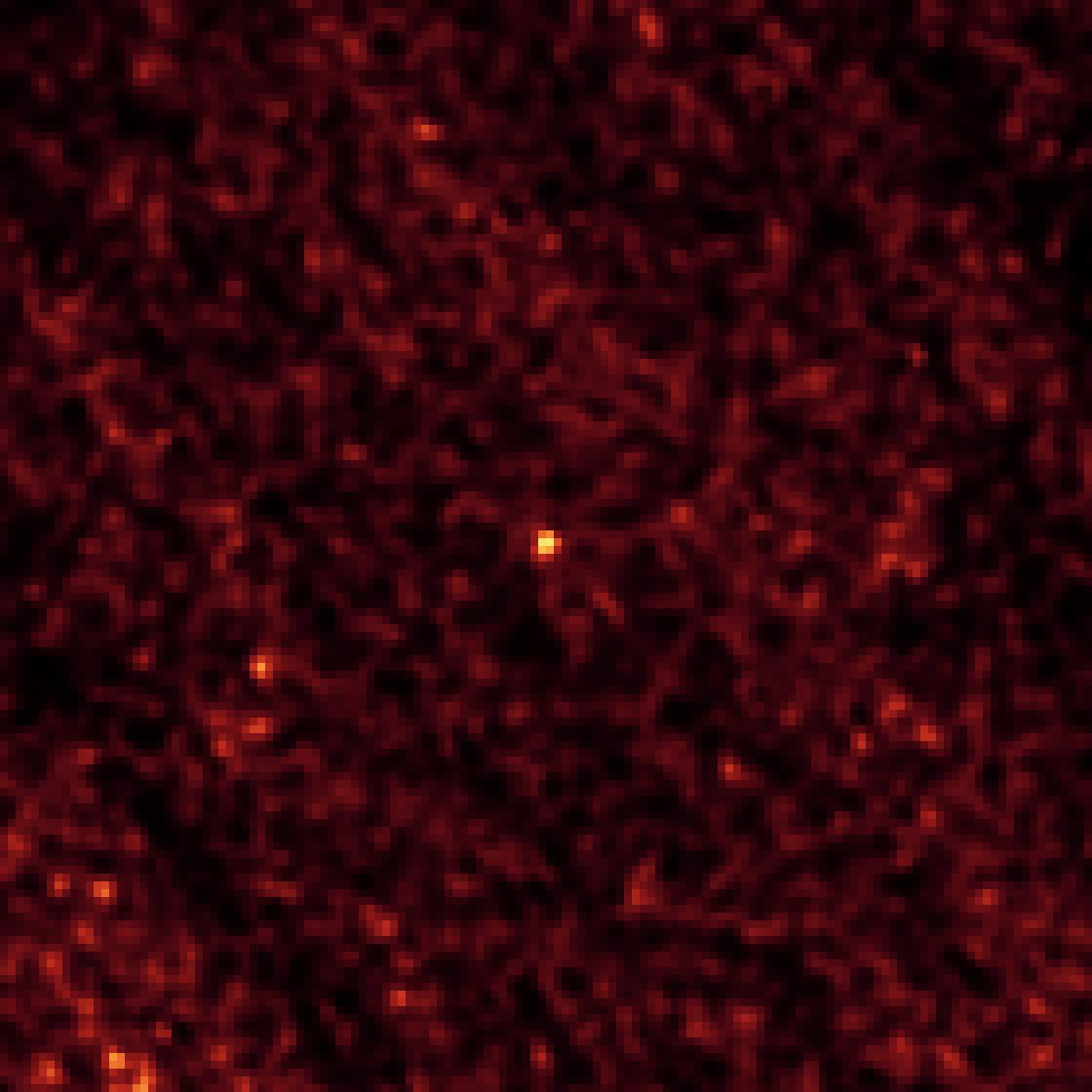
- 2011 MD imaged by Spitzer in February 2014

Discovery
- Discovered by: LINEAR
- Discovery site: Lincoln Lab's ETS
- Discovery date: 2011 June 22 (first observed only)

Designations
- Minor planet category: NEO · Apollo · Amor

Orbital characteristics
- Epoch 13 July 2011 (JD 2455755.5)
- Uncertainty parameter 2 · 0
- Observation arc: 2.65 yr (967 days)
- Aphelion: 1.1031 AU
- Perihelion: 1.0161 AU
- Semi-major axis: 1.0596 AU
- Eccentricity: 0.0411
- Orbital period (sidereal): 1.09 yr (398 days)
- Mean anomaly: 11.051°
- Mean motion: 0° 54^{m} 13.32^{s} / day
- Inclination: 2.5624°
- Longitude of ascending node: 273.96°
- Argument of perihelion: 4.6748°
- Earth MOID: 0.0003 AU (0.1 LD)

Physical characteristics
- Mean diameter: 6 m (estimate)
- Mean density: 1 g/cm^{3} (est. rubble pile)
- Synodic rotation period: 0.1937 h
- Geometric albedo: 0.3
- Absolute magnitude (H): 28.0

2011 MD is a bright micro-asteroid, classified as a near-Earth object of the Apollo and Amor group, respectively. On 27 June 2011, at around 17:00 UTC (13:00 EDT), the object passed exceptionally close to Earth's surface at a distance of approximately 12,000 kilometers (7,500 mi), roughly the diameter of the Earth.

== Description ==
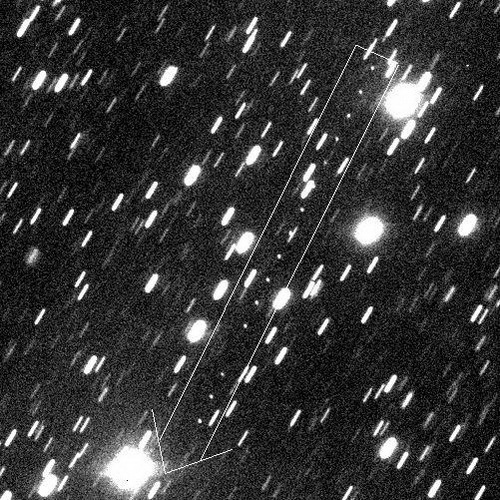
2011 MD on 26 June 2011

Although 2011 MD was initially believed to be space junk, subsequent observations confirmed that it is an asteroid. A few hours before the asteroid's nearest approach in 2011, it appeared close to the Sun, so observations were possible for only a brief period. Backyard astronomers were able to observe it with telescopes from Australia, southern Africa, and the Americas.

2011 MD was discovered on 22 June 2011, by astronomers of the Lincoln Near-Earth Asteroid Research (LINEAR) at the U.S. Lincoln Laboratory Experimental Test Site in Socorro, New Mexico, by a pair of robotic telescopes. According to original rough estimates, the asteroid's length was between 10 and 45 meters (30 and 150 ft). However, according to the more recent absolute magnitude (H) measurement of 28.1 and its albedo of 0.3, the asteroid is closer to 6 meters or 20 feet in diameter.

Emily Baldwin of Astronomy Now said that there was no threat of collision, and should the asteroid enter Earth's atmosphere, it would "mostly burn up in a brilliant fireball, possibly scattering a few meteorites", causing no likely harm to life or property on the ground.

The 27 June 2011 close approach to Earth increased the orbital period of 2011 MD from 380 days to 396 days. During close approach the asteroid passed Earth at a relative speed of 6.7 km/s with a geocentric eccentricity of 1.1.

2011 MD was observed by the Spitzer Space Telescope in February 2014 and estimated to be 6 meters (20 ft) in diameter. The asteroid is a porous rubble pile with a density similar to water. On 19 June 2014, NASA reported that asteroid 2011 MD was a prime candidate for capture by the Asteroid Redirect Mission (ARM) in the early 2020s.

Parameter	Epoch	aphelion (Q)	perihelion (q)	Semi-major axis (a)	eccentricity (e)	Period (p)	inclination (i)	Longitude ascending node (Ω)	Mean anomaly (M)	Argument of perihelion (ω)
Units		AU			—	(days)	(°)			
Pre-flyby	2011-Jun-01	1.043	1.006	1.025	0.01804	379.1	2.739°	97.79°	269.8°	244.3°
Post-flyby	2011-Aug-01	1.097	1.016	1.056	0.03875	396.9	2.477°	273.0°	29.09°	4.734°

=== Gallery ===
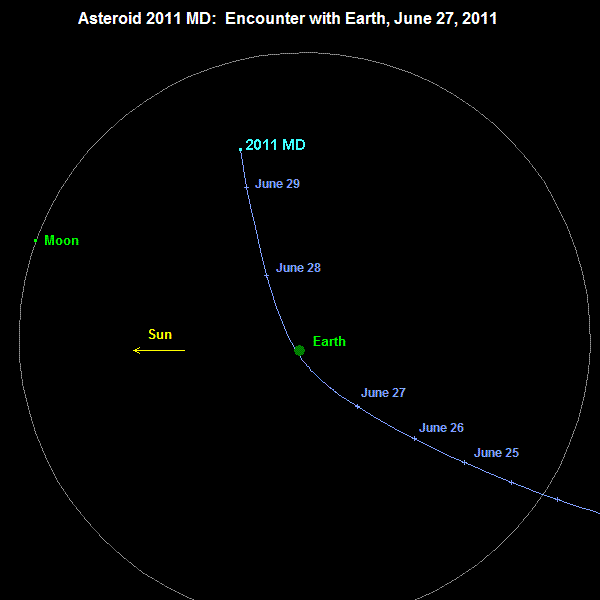
Trajectory of 2011 MD projected onto the Earth's orbital plane. Note, from this viewing angle, the asteroid passes underneath the Earth.

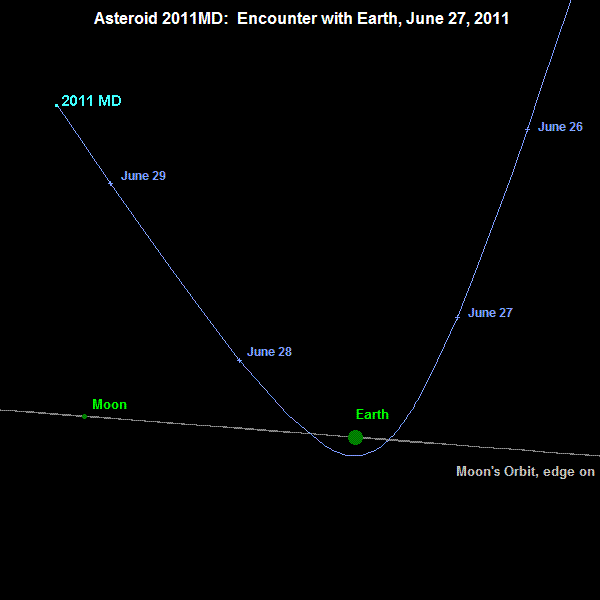
Trajectory of 2011 MD from the general direction of the Sun.

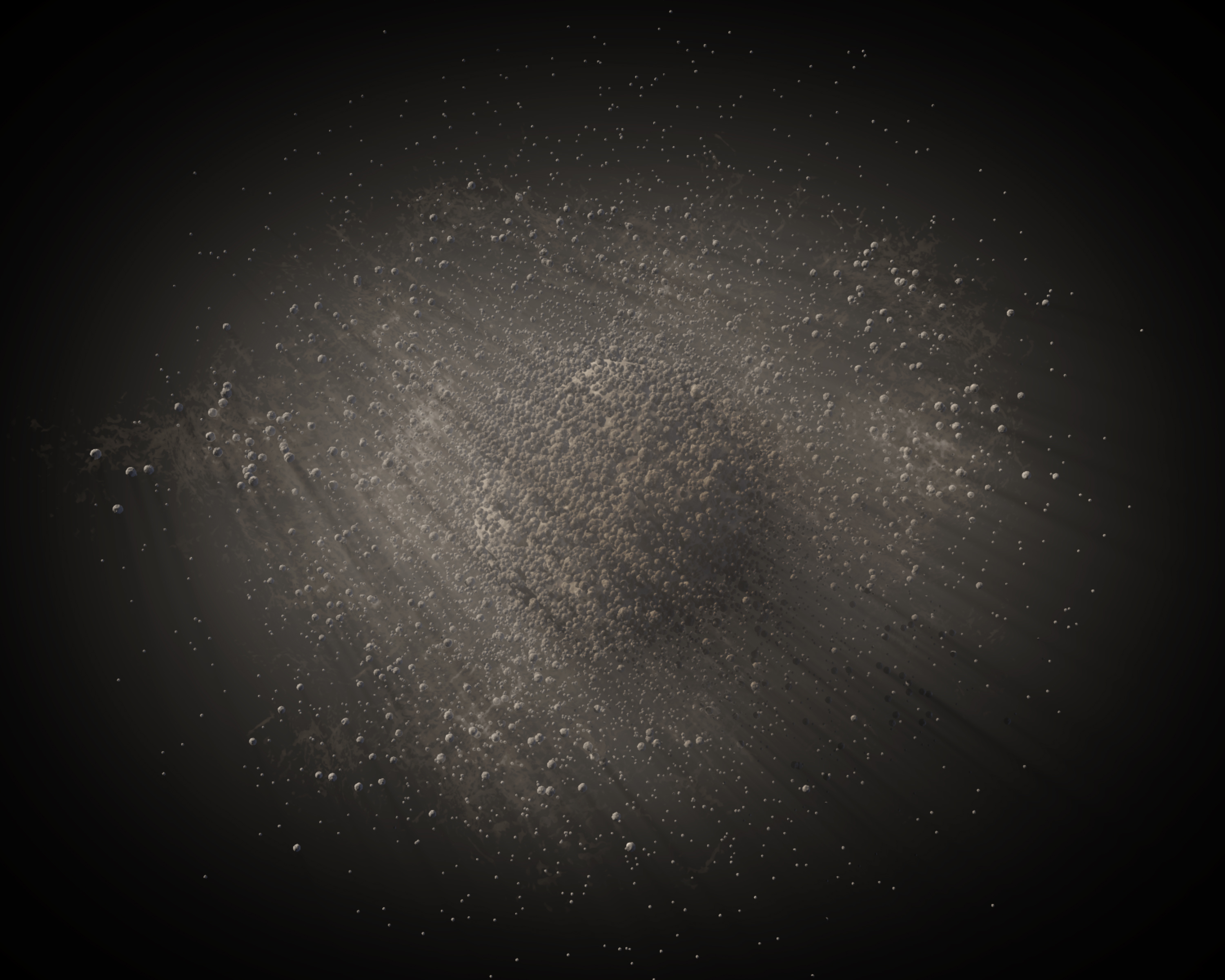
Artist's concept of spacious structure of asteroid 2011 MD

== See also ==
- Asteroid capture
- Asteroid Redirect Mission
