= List of asteroid close approaches to Earth in 2022 =

- Asteroids which came closer to Earth than the Moon in 2022 by time of discovery
- After closest approach: 80 (55.9%)
- < 24 hours before: 26 (18.2%)
- up to 7 days before: 36 (25.2%)
- > one week before: 1 (0.7%)
- > 7 weeks before: 0 (0.0%)
- > one year before: 0 (0.0%)
Other years

- Asteroids which came closer to Earth than the Moon in 2022 by discoverer
- G96 Mt. Lemmon Survey: 47 (32.9%); 703 Catalina Sky Survey: 21 (14.7%); P07 SST, HEH Station: 17 (11.9%); F52 Pan-STARRS 2, Haleakala: 16 (11.2%); T08 ATLAS-MLO, Mauna Loa: 9 (6.3%); K88 GINOP-KHK, Piszkesteto: 7 (4.9%); F51 Pan-STARRS 1, Haleakala: 6 (4.2%); T05 ATLAS-HKO, Haleakala: 6 (4.2%); 381 Tokyo-Kiso: 5 (3.5%); V00 Kitt Peak-Bok: 2 (1.4%); W94 MAP, San Pedro de Atacama: 2 (1.4%); I41 ZTF, Palomar Mountain: 1 (0.7%); M22 ATLAS South Africa, Sutherland: 1 (0.7%); K19 PASTIS Observatory, Banon: 1 (0.7%); W68 ATLAS Chile, Rio Hurtado: 1 (0.7%); Y00 SONEAR Observatory, Oliveira: 1 (0.7%)

Below is the list of asteroids that have come close to Earth in 2022.

== Timeline of known close approaches less than one lunar distance from Earth ==
A list of known near-Earth asteroid close approaches less than 1 lunar distance (0.0025696 AU (384,410 km; 238,860 mi)) from Earth in 2022, based on the close approach database of the Center for Near-Earth Object Studies (CNEOS). During 2022 143 asteroids passed within 1 LD of Earth. As most asteroids passing within a lunar distance are less than 40 meters in diameter, they generally are not detected until they are within several million km of Earth.

For reference, the radius of Earth is about 0.0000426 AU (6,370 km; 3,960 mi) or 0.0166 lunar distances. Geosynchronous satellites have an orbit with semi-major axis length of 0.000282 AU (42,200 km; 26,200 mi) or 0.110 lunar distances.

The first asteroid flyby within 1 LD of Earth in 2022 was asteroid 2021 YK (10–20 meters in diameter), which was observed on 27 December 2021 04:40 UT (when it was about 3.8 million km from Earth) and passed 0.49 LD (190 thousand km) from Earth on 2 January 2022. The largest asteroid to pass within 1 LD of Earth in 2022 was 2022 TM_{2} with an estimated diameter between 24 and 53 meters for an absolute magnitude of 25.2. The fastest asteroid to pass within 1 LD of Earth in 2022 was 2022 YW_{6} that passed Earth with a velocity with respect to Earth of 29.8 km/s (67,000 mph). (Note: 2022 YW_{6} passed Earth with a velocity with respect to Earth of 29.8 km/s and was moving away from the Sun at 38.1 km/s.)

The CNEOS database of close approaches lists some close approaches a full orbit or more before the discovery of the object, derived by orbit calculation. The list below only includes close approaches that are evidenced by observations, thus the pre-discovery close approaches would only be included if the object was found by precovery, but there was no such close approach in 2022.

This list and relevant databases do not consider impacts as close approaches, thus this list does not include 2022 EB5 and 2022 WJ1, two asteroids which were predicted to impact on Earth and burned up in its atmosphere, as well as several more objects that collided with Earth's atmosphere in 2023 which weren't discovered in advance, but were observed visually or recorded by infrasound sensors designed to detect detonation of nuclear devices.

Rows highlighted red indicate objects which were not discovered until after closest approach

Rows highlighted yellow indicate objects discovered less than 24 hours before closest approach

Rows highlighted green indicate objects discovered more than one week before closest approach

Rows highlighted turquoise indicate objects discovered more than 7 weeks before closest approach

Rows highlighted blue indicate objects discovered more than one year before closest approach
(i.e. objects successfully cataloged on a previous orbit, rather than being detected during final approach)

Date of closest approach	Discovery (Note: Discovery date, and if the object was confirmed and previously undiscovered, the discoverer)	Object	Nominal geocentric distance (Note: Distance from the center of Earth to the center of the object. See the NASA/JPL Solar System Dynamics Glossary: Geocentric. Earth has a radius of approximately 6,400 km (0.0166 LD).)		Approx. size (m)	(H) (abs. mag.)	Closer approach to Moon (Note: Objects that approached closer to the Moon than Earth are marked with a check.)
Date of closest approach	Discovery	Object	(AU)	(Lunar distance)	Approx. size (m)	(H) (abs. mag.)	Closer approach to Moon
2022-01-02	2021-12-27; G96 Mt. Lemmon Survey	2021 YK	0.00127 AU (190,000 km; 118,000 mi)	0.494	9.0–20	27.4	✓
2022-01-02	2022-01-05; G96 Mt. Lemmon Survey	2022 AP_{1}	0.00121 AU (181,000 km; 112,000 mi)	0.470	5.6–12	28.4	—
2022-01-03	2022-01-05; G96 Mt. Lemmon Survey	2022 AU	0.00213 AU (319,000 km; 198,000 mi)	0.829	4.0–8.9	29.1	—
2022-01-03	2022-01-05; G96 Mt. Lemmon Survey	2022 AO_{1}	0.00232 AU (347,000 km; 216,000 mi)	0.904	3.2–7.1	29.6	—
2022-01-05	2022-01-06; G96 Mt. Lemmon Survey	2022 AV_{13}	0.000732 AU (109,500 km; 68,000 mi)	0.285	1.1–2.6	31.8	✓
2022-01-06	2022-01-07; F52 Pan-STARRS 2, Haleakala	2022 AY_{4}	0.00202 AU (302,000 km; 188,000 mi)	0.786	3.1–6.8	29.7	✓
2022-01-07	2022-01-07; 381 Tokyo-Kiso	2022 AY_{54}	0.00173 AU (259,000 km; 161,000 mi)	0.673	2.4–5.3	30.3	?
2022-01-10	2022-01-11; 703 Catalina Sky Survey	2022 AY_{5}	0.000683 AU (102,200 km; 63,500 mi)	0.266	3.8–8.6	29.2	—
2022-01-10	2022-01-10; T08 ATLAS-MLO, Mauna Loa	2022 AC_{7}	0.00103 AU (154,000 km; 96,000 mi)	0.400	2.5–5.6	30.1	—
2022-01-11	2022-01-09; G96 Mt. Lemmon Survey	2022 AC_{4}	0.000615 AU (92,000 km; 57,200 mi)	0.239	4.1–9.1	29.1	—
2022-01-23	2022-01-23; K88 GINOP-KHK, Piszkesteto	2022 BN	0.000617 AU (92,300 km; 57,400 mi)	0.263	5.4–12	28.5	—
2022-01-24	2022-01-25; 703 Catalina Sky Survey	2022 BT	0.000677 AU (101,300 km; 62,900 mi)	0.263	2.9–6.5	29.8	—
2022-01-25	2022-01-26; G96 Mt. Lemmon Survey	2022 BA_{7}	0.000662 AU (99,000 km; 61,500 mi)	0.257	1.8–4.0	30.9	—
2022-01-27	2022-01-26; G96 Mt. Lemmon Survey	2022 BD_{1}	0.00124 AU (186,000 km; 115,000 mi)	0.482	3.6–8.1	29.3	—
2022-01-27	2022-01-28; 703 Catalina Sky Survey	2022 BH_{3}	0.00211 AU (316,000 km; 196,000 mi)	0.820	14–32	26.3	✓
2022-01-28	2022-01-27; G96 Mt. Lemmon Survey	2022 BN_{2}	0.00188 AU (281,000 km; 175,000 mi)	0.733	3.0–6.6	29.8	—
2022-02-01	2022-02-02; T05 ATLAS-HKO, Haleakala	2022 CE	0.00140 AU (209,000 km; 130,000 mi)	0.546	6.8–15	27.9	—
2022-02-02	2022-02-02; T05 ATLAS-HKO, Haleakala	2022 CG	0.00231 AU (346,000 km; 215,000 mi)	0.898	15–34	26.2	—
2022-02-02	2022-02-05; G96 Mt. Lemmon Survey	2022 CY_{1}	0.00183 AU (274,000 km; 170,000 mi)	0.710	6.4–14	28.1	✓
2022-02-05	2022-02-08; 703 Catalina Sky Survey	2022 CU_{4}	0.00220 AU (329,000 km; 205,000 mi)	0.855	3.6–8.1	29.3	—
2022-02-05	2022-02-06; G96 Mt. Lemmon Survey	2022 CB_{3}	0.000561 AU (83,900 km; 52,100 mi)	0.218	2.1–4.6	30.5	—
2022-02-08	2022-02-06; V00 Kitt Peak-Bok	2022 CD_{3}	0.00192 AU (287,000 km; 178,000 mi)	0.746	5.1–11	28.6	—
2022-02-10	2022-02-09; G96 Mt. Lemmon Survey	2022 CJ_{5}	0.000213 AU (31,900 km; 19,800 mi)	0.083	2.3–5.2	30.3	—
2022-02-12	2022-02-13; 703 Catalina Sky Survey	2022 CG_{7}	0.000341 AU (51,000 km; 31,700 mi)	0.133	5.0–11	28.6	—
2022-02-13	2022-02-14; 703 Catalina Sky Survey	2022 CL_{7}	0.000561 AU (83,900 km; 52,100 mi)	0.218	3.1–7.0	29.7	—
2022-02-14	2022-02-13; G96 Mt. Lemmon Survey	2022 CF_{7}	0.00213 AU (319,000 km; 198,000 mi)	0.829	6.7–15	28.0	—
2022-02-15	2022-02-10; W94 MAP, San Pedro de Atacama	2022 CO_{6}	0.00150 AU (224,000 km; 139,000 mi)	0.579	16–37	26.1	✓
2022-02-24	2022-02-26; G96 Mt. Lemmon Survey	2022 DY_{1}	0.00149 AU (223,000 km; 139,000 mi)	0.579	6.9–15	27.9	—
2022-02-27	2022-02-27; T08 ATLAS-MLO, Mauna Loa	2022 DO_{3}	0.000879 AU (131,500 km; 81,700 mi)	0.342	11–25	26.9	—
2022-02-27	2022-02-27; P07 SST, HEH Station	2022 DY_{29}	0.00196 AU (293,000 km; 182,000 mi)	0.763	3.0–6.6	29.8	?
2022-02-28	2022-02-28; P07 SST, HEH Station	2022 DZ_{29}	0.000698 AU (104,400 km; 64,900 mi)	0.271	1.6–3.5	31.1	?
2022-03-02	2022-02-28; F52 Pan-STARRS 2, Haleakala	2022 DM_{4}	0.00174 AU (260,000 km; 162,000 mi)	0.675	3.8–8.6	29.2	✓
2022-03-02	2022-03-02; 381 Tokyo-Kiso	2022 ET	0.00182 AU (272,000 km; 169,000 mi)	0.709	2.4–5.4	30.2	—
2022-03-03	2022-03-02; 703 Catalina Sky Survey	2022 EQ	0.000973 AU (145,600 km; 90,400 mi)	0.379	3.0–6.8	29.7	—
2022-03-04	2022-03-02; G96 Mt. Lemmon Survey	2022 EF_{1}	0.00188 AU (281,000 km; 175,000 mi)	0.733	4.3–9.5	29.0	✓
2022-03-08	2022-03-10; G96 Mt. Lemmon Survey	2022 EE_{5}	0.000681 AU (101,900 km; 63,300 mi)	0.265	2.5–5.5	30.1	—
2022-03-09	2022-03-08; F52 Pan-STARRS 2, Haleakala	2022 EV_{3}	0.000528 AU (79,000 km; 49,100 mi)	0.205	2.9–6.4	29.8	—
2022-03-13	2022-03-07; V00 Kitt Peak-Bok	2022 ES_{3}	0.00223 AU (334,000 km; 207,000 mi)	0.866	9.8–22	27.2	✓
2022-03-15	2022-03-16; 703 Catalina Sky Survey	2022 FA	0.00126 AU (188,000 km; 117,000 mi)	0.490	9.9–22	27.1	—
2022-03-24	2022-03-27; G96 Mt. Lemmon Survey	2022 FZ_{3}	0.00204 AU (305,000 km; 190,000 mi)	0.796	4.5–10	28.9	—
2022-03-25	2022-03-24; K88 GINOP-KHK, Piszkesteto	2022 FD1	0.0000992 AU (14,840 km; 9,220 mi)	0.039	1.6–3.7	31.1	—
2022-03-26	2022-03-24; G96 Mt. Lemmon Survey	2022 FA_{1}	0.00176 AU (263,000 km; 164,000 mi)	0.684	3.7–8.4	29.3	—
2022-03-28	2022-03-26; 703 Catalina Sky Survey	2022 FB_{2}	0.00100 AU (150,000 km; 93,000 mi)	0.391	12–26	26.8	—
2022-03-29	2022-03-29; P07 SST, HEH Station	2022 FB_{21}	0.00114 AU (171,000 km; 106,000 mi)	0.443	0.93–2.1	32.3	?
2022-03-30	2022-04-02; G96 Mt. Lemmon Survey	2022 GX_{2}	0.000977 AU (146,200 km; 90,800 mi)	0.380	3.6–8.1	29.3	—
2022-03-30	2022-04-01; G96 Mt. Lemmon Survey	2022 GB	0.00189 AU (283,000 km; 176,000 mi)	0.736	3.5–7.8	29.4	—
2022-03-30	2022-04-03; F52 Pan-STARRS 2, Haleakala	2022 GB_{2}	0.00148 AU (221,000 km; 138,000 mi)	0.576	4.4–9.8	28.9	—
2022-04-01	2022-04-01; T08 ATLAS-MLO, Mauna Loa	2022 GC	0.000354 AU (53,000 km; 32,900 mi)	0.138	4.2–9.4	29.0	—
2022-04-01	2022-04-02; 703 Catalina Sky Survey	2022 GQ	0.000365 AU (54,600 km; 33,900 mi)	0.142	2.2–4.9	30.4	—
2022-04-06	2022-04-04; G96 Mt. Lemmon Survey	2022 GN_{1}	0.000842 AU (126,000 km; 78,300 mi)	0.328	7.3–16	27.8	—
2022-04-06	2022-04-05; G96 Mt. Lemmon Survey	2022 GZ_{1}	0.00160 AU (239,000 km; 149,000 mi)	0.624	4.4–9.9	28.9	—
2022-04-07	2022-04-04; G96 Mt. Lemmon Survey	2022 GQ_{1}	0.00149 AU (223,000 km; 139,000 mi)	0.579	6.5–14	28.1	—
2022-04-08	2022-04-08; 703 Catalina Sky Survey	2022 GQ_{5}	0.000127 AU (19,000 km; 11,800 mi)	0.049	1.2–2.7	31.7	—
2022-04-09	2022-04-08; 703 Catalina Sky Survey	2022 GF_{3}	0.00151 AU (226,000 km; 140,000 mi)	0.587	7.0–16	27.9	—
2022-04-21	2022-04-22; K88 GINOP-KHK, Piszkesteto	2022 HM	0.00164 AU (245,000 km; 152,000 mi)	0.640	8.2–18	27.6	—
2022-04-26	2022-04-24; G96 Mt. Lemmon Survey	2022 HB_{1}	0.00134 AU (200,000 km; 125,000 mi)	0.522	9.2–21	27.3	—
2022-05-05	2022-05-06; G96 Mt. Lemmon Survey	2022 JV	0.00213 AU (319,000 km; 198,000 mi)	0.827	3.1–7.0	29.6	✓
2022-05-05	2022-03-02; 381 Tokyo-Kiso	2022 JN_{11}	0.00177 AU (265,000 km; 165,000 mi)	0.690	3.5–7.8	29.4	?
2022-05-06	2022-05-06; G96 Mt. Lemmon Survey	2022 JM_{2}	0.00103 AU (154,000 km; 96,000 mi)	0.401	7.0–16	27.9	—
2022-05-09	2022-05-03; G96 Mt. Lemmon Survey	2022 JM	0.00253 AU (378,000 km; 235,000 mi)	0.985	4.6–10	28.8	—
2022-05-10	2022-05-09; T08 ATLAS-MLO, Mauna Loa	2022 JO_{1}	0.000465 AU (69,600 km; 43,200 mi)	0.181	9.5–21	27.2	—
2022-05-22	2022-05-23; T05 ATLAS-HKO, Haleakala	2022 KG_{1}	0.000403 AU (60,300 km; 37,500 mi)	0.157	4.5–10	28.9	—
2022-05-25	2022-05-25; 703 Catalina Sky Survey	2022 KP_{6}	0.000116 AU (17,400 km; 10,800 mi)	0.045	3.5–7.8	29.4	—
2022-05-30	2022-05-26; F52 Pan-STARRS 2, Haleakala	2022 KO_{3}	0.00195 AU (292,000 km; 181,000 mi)	0.760	6.5–15	28.1	—
2022-05-30	2022-05-30; 703 Catalina Sky Survey	2022 KQ_{5}	0.000271 AU (40,500 km; 25,200 mi)	0.105	4.0–9.0	29.1	—
2022-06-08	2022-06-08; T08 ATLAS-MLO, Mauna Loa	2022 LU_{2}	0.00111 AU (166,000 km; 103,000 mi)	0.433	7.2–16	27.8	—
2022-06-20	2022-06-20; P07 SST, HEH Station	2022 MJ_{15}	0.00106 AU (159,000 km; 99,000 mi)	0.411	1.6–3.5	31.2	?
2022-06-28	2022-06-21; F52 Pan-STARRS 2, Haleakala	2022 MN_{1}	0.00239 AU (358,000 km; 222,000 mi)	0.929	9.3–21	27.3	✓
2022-07-01	2022-06-30; F52 Pan-STARRS 2, Haleakala	2022 MJ_{3}	0.00101 AU (151,000 km; 94,000 mi)	0.392	3.3–7.3	29.6	—
2022-07-02	2022-07-02; I41 Palomar Mountain--ZTF	2022 NK	0.00212 AU (317,000 km; 197,000 mi)	0.826	9.3–21	27.3	—
2022-07-06	2022-07-04; F52 Pan-STARRS 2, Haleakala	2022 NE	0.000909 AU (136,000 km; 84,500 mi)	0.354	4.9–11	28.6	—
2022-07-07	2022-07-04; F52 Pan-STARRS 2, Haleakala	2022 NF	0.000595 AU (89,000 km; 55,300 mi)	0.232	5.4–12	28.5	—
2022-07-10	2022-07-06; 703 Catalina Sky Survey	2022 NR	0.00257 AU (384,000 km; 239,000 mi)	0.999	18–40	25.9	✓
2022-07-15	2022-07-26; F52 Pan-STARRS 2, Haleakala	2022 OR_{1}	0.00232 AU (347,000 km; 216,000 mi)	0.902	6.8–15	28.0	✓
2022-08-05	2022-08-05; P07 SST, HEH Station	2022 PW_{40}	0.000882 AU (131,900 km; 82,000 mi)	0.343	1.1–2.5	31.9	?
2022-08-08	2022-08-10; F52 Pan-STARRS 2, Haleakala	2022 PW_{1}	0.00163 AU (244,000 km; 152,000 mi)	0.636	7.6–17	27.7	—
2022-08-11	2022-08-18; F51 Pan-STARRS 1, Haleakala	2022 QN_{4}	0.00109 AU (163,000 km; 101,000 mi)	0.426	12–27	26.7	—
2022-08-16	2022-08-16; T08 ATLAS-MLO, Mauna Loa	2022 QA	0.00200 AU (299,000 km; 186,000 mi)	0.778	11–24	26.9	—
2022-08-20	2022-08-21; M22 ATLAS South Africa, Sutherland	2022 QO_{2}	0.00137 AU (205,000 km; 127,000 mi)	0.535	7.8–17	27.7	—
2022-08-20	2022-08-21; T08 ATLAS-MLO, Mauna Loa	2022 QW_{1}	0.00137 AU (205,000 km; 127,000 mi)	0.532	10–23	27.1	—
2022-08-20	2022-08-20; P07 SST, HEH Station	2022 QC_{265}	0.00149 AU (223,000 km; 139,000 mi)	0.578	3.2–7.6	29.6	?
2022-08-20	2022-08-21; T05 ATLAS-HKO, Haleakala	2022 QE_{1}	0.00124 AU (186,000 km; 115,000 mi)	0.481	5.7–13	28.3	—
2022-08-24	2022-08-24; P07 SST, HEH Station	2022 QF_{265}	0.00233 AU (349,000 km; 217,000 mi)	0.907	2.6–5.9	30.0	?
2022-08-24	2022-08-24; P07 SST, HEH Station	2022 QE_{265}	0.00176 AU (263,000 km; 164,000 mi)	0.684	4.3–9.6	29.0	?
2022-08-31	2022-09-01; W68 ATLAS Chile, Rio Hurtado	2022 RL	0.000939 AU (140,500 km; 87,300 mi)	0.365	4.8–11	28.7	—
2022-08-31	2022-08-31; P07 SST, HEH Station	2022 QG_{265}	0.00128 AU (191,000 km; 119,000 mi)	0.498	2.4–5.4	30.2	?
2022-09-01	2022-09-01; F52 Pan-STARRS 2, Haleakala	2022 RT_{1}	0.000221 AU (33,100 km; 20,500 mi)	0.086	1.4–3.0	31.5	—
2022-09-03	2022-09-04; T08 ATLAS-MLO, Mauna Loa	2022 RB_{2}	0.00177 AU (265,000 km; 165,000 mi)	0.689	8.4–19	27.5	—
2022-09-17	2022-09-18; F52 Pan-STARRS 2, Haleakala	2022 SJ_{3}	0.000935 AU (139,900 km; 86,900 mi)	0.364	2.1–4.6	30.5	—
2022-09-17	2022-09-18; F51 Pan-STARRS 1, Haleakala	2022 SX_{55}	0.000372 AU (55,700 km; 34,600 mi)	0.145	2.4–5.4	30.2	—
2022-09-19	2022-09-19; P07 SST, HEH Station	2022 SL_{301}	0.00108 AU (162,000 km; 100,000 mi)	0.422	1.6–3.6	31.1	?
2022-09-19	2022-09-20; Y00 SONEAR Observatory, Oliveira	2022 SK_{4}	0.000100 AU (15,000 km; 9,300 mi)	0.039	2.3–5.1	30.4	—
2022-09-22	2022-09-22; P07 SST, HEH Station	2022 SK_{333}	0.000572 AU (85,600 km; 53,200 mi)	0.222	1.1–2.5	31.9	?
2022-09-23	2022-09-24; T05 ATLAS-HKO, Haleakala	2022 SD_{9}	0.00165 AU (247,000 km; 153,000 mi)	0.643	5.6–12	28.4	—
2022-09-24	2022-09-26; G96 Mt. Lemmon Survey	2022 SF_{19}	0.00113 AU (169,000 km; 105,000 mi)	0.439	3.7–8.2	29.3	—
2022-10-01	2022-10-03; 703 Catalina Sky Survey	2022 TL	0.00253 AU (378,000 km; 235,000 mi)	0.984	6.9–15	27.9	—
2022-10-06	2022-10-01; F51 Pan-STARRS 1, Haleakala	2022 TD	0.00249 AU (372,000 km; 231,000 mi)	0.968	7.6–17	27.7	—
2022-10-12	2022-10-14; F52 Pan-STARRS 2, Haleakala	2022 TY_{3}	0.00112 AU (168,000 km; 104,000 mi)	0.434	12–27	26.7	—
2022-10-13	2022-10-15; K19 PASTIS Observatory, Banon	2022 TW_{2}	0.00180 AU (269,000 km; 167,000 mi)	0.700	5.2–12	28.6	—
2022-10-13	2022-10-14; F52 Pan-STARRS 2, Haleakala	2022 TQ_{2}	0.00113 AU (169,000 km; 105,000 mi)	0.440	11–24	27.0	—
2022-10-15	2022-10-13; G96 Mt. Lemmon Survey	2022 TM_{2}	0.00141 AU (211,000 km; 131,000 mi)	0.547	24–53	25.2	—
2022-10-16	2022-10-16; P07 SST, HEH Station	2022 UY_{123}	0.00179 AU (268,000 km; 166,000 mi)	0.697	2.0–4.5	30.6	?
2022-10-16	2022-10-16; T05 ATLAS-HKO, Haleakala	2022 UG_{3}	0.000432 AU (64,600 km; 40,200 mi)	0.168	3.6–8.1	29.3	—
2022-10-17	2022-10-20; G96 Mt. Lemmon Survey	2022 UA_{5}	0.00112 AU (168,000 km; 104,000 mi)	0.437	2.7–6.1	29.9	—
2022-10-18	2022-10-18; P07 SST, HEH Station	2022 UE_{146}	0.00181 AU (271,000 km; 168,000 mi)	0.704	1.1–2.4	32.0	?
2022-10-20	2022-10-20; T08 ATLAS-MLO, Mauna Loa	2022 UR4	0.000114 AU (17,100 km; 10,600 mi)	0.044	4.4–9.7	28.9	—
2022-10-22	2022-10-22; P07 SST, HEH Station	2022 UU_{123}	0.00166 AU (248,000 km; 154,000 mi)	0.646	2.0–4.6	30.6	?
2022-10-22	2022-10-17; F52 Pan-STARRS 2, Haleakala	2022 UY_{5}	0.00153 AU (229,000 km; 142,000 mi)	0.595	9.3–21	27.3	—
2022-10-24	2022-10-26; K88 GINOP-KHK, Piszkesteto	2022 UV_{10}	0.00232 AU (347,000 km; 216,000 mi)	0.904	6.3–14	28.1	✓
2022-10-24	2022-10-22; G96 Mt. Lemmon Survey	2022 UC_{7}	0.00232 AU (347,000 km; 216,000 mi)	0.904	7.7–17	27.7	—
2022-10-24	2022-10-25; G96 Mt. Lemmon Survey	2022 UQ_{40}	0.000633 AU (94,700 km; 58,800 mi)	0.246	5.8–13	28.1	—
2022-10-24	2022-10-23; F51 Pan-STARRS 1, Haleakala	2022 UV_{7}	0.00163 AU (244,000 km; 152,000 mi)	0.635	3.3–7.5	29.5	—
2022-10-25	2022-10-25; P07 SST, HEH Station	2022 UL_{147}	0.000620 AU (92,800 km; 57,600 mi)	0.241	2.1–4.7	30.5	?
2022-10-26	2022-10-28; G96 Mt. Lemmon Survey	2022 UC_{14}	0.00150 AU (224,000 km; 139,000 mi)	0.585	3.1–6.9	29.7	—
2022-10-27	2022-10-28; G96 Mt. Lemmon Survey	2022 UW_{14}	0.00183 AU (274,000 km; 170,000 mi)	0.712	4.7–11	28.8	—
2022-10-27	2022-10-27; 381 Tokyo-Kiso	2022 UB_{13}	0.00209 AU (313,000 km; 194,000 mi)	0.813	2.8–6.2	29.9	—
2022-10-27	2022-10-28; G96 Mt. Lemmon Survey	2022 UU_{63}	0.000506 AU (75,700 km; 47,000 mi)	0.197	1.7–3.7	31.0	✓
2022-10-27	2022-10-28; 381 Tokyo-Kiso	2022 UA_{14}	0.00218 AU (326,000 km; 203,000 mi)	0.849	5.7–13	28.3	—
2022-10-28	2022-11-01; G96 Mt. Lemmon Survey	2022 VH	0.00218 AU (326,000 km; 203,000 mi)	0.850	14–31	26.4	—
2022-10-29	2022-10-30; 703 Catalina Sky Survey	2022 UW_{16}	0.000258 AU (38,600 km; 24,000 mi)	0.100	4.4–9.9	28.9	—
2022-10-30	2022-10-29; W94 MAP, San Pedro de Atacama	2022 UW_{15}	0.000806 AU (120,600 km; 74,900 mi)	0.314	2.5–5.5	30.2	—
2022-10-31	2022-10-31; K88 GINOP-KHK, Piszkesteto	2022 UK_{24}	0.00252 AU (377,000 km; 234,000 mi)	0.979	6.3–14	28.1	—
2022-10-31	2022-11-02; G96 Mt. Lemmon Survey	2022 VG_{1}	0.00120 AU (180,000 km; 112,000 mi)	0.467	4.4–9.9	28.9	—
2022-11-20	2022-11-21; 703 Catalina Sky Survey	2022 WM_{3}	0.00132 AU (197,000 km; 123,000 mi)	0.513	5.5–12	28.4	—
2022-11-22	2022-11-23; G96 Mt. Lemmon Survey	2022 WR_{4}	0.00178 AU (266,000 km; 165,000 mi)	0.692	2.6–5.9	30.0	—
2022-11-23	2022-11-26; F51 Pan-STARRS 1, Haleakala	2022 WO_{6}	0.00213 AU (319,000 km; 198,000 mi)	0.830	4.2–9.3	29.0	—
2022-11-23	2022-11-23; P07 SST, HEH Station	2022 WS_{27}	0.00226 AU (338,000 km; 210,000 mi)	0.881	2.3–5.0	30.4	?
2022-11-23	2022-11-23; P07 SST, HEH Station	2022 WT_{27}	0.00102 AU (153,000 km; 95,000 mi)	0.398	0.91–2.0	32.3	?
2022-11-27	2022-11-29; 703 Catalina Sky Survey	2022 WS_{10}	0.00183 AU (274,000 km; 170,000 mi)	0.712	13–29	26.6	—
2022-11-27	2022-11-28; G96 Mt. Lemmon Survey	2022 WN_{9}	0.000323 AU (48,300 km; 30,000 mi)	0.126	3.3–7.3	29.6	—
2022-11-28	2022-11-26; F51 Pan-STARRS 1, Haleakala	2022 WM7	0.000525 AU (78,500 km; 48,800 mi)	0.204	2.8–6.3	29.9	—
2022-11-29	2022-11-28; G96 Mt. Lemmon Survey	2022 WE_{11}	0.00198 AU (296,000 km; 184,000 mi)	0.771	2.8–6.3	29.9	—
2022-12-01	2022-12-01; K88 GINOP-KHK, Piszkesteto	2022 XL	0.00101 AU (151,000 km; 94,000 mi)	0.394	3.7–8.2	29.3	—
2022-12-02	2022-12-01; G96 Mt. Lemmon Survey	2022 XB	0.00252 AU (377,000 km; 234,000 mi)	0.982	4.9–11	28.7	—
2022-12-14	2022-12-11; G96 Mt. Lemmon Survey	2022 XX	0.00139 AU (208,000 km; 129,000 mi)	0.542	4.8–11	28.7	—
2022-12-17	2022-12-17; 703 Catalina Sky Survey	2022 YO1	0.000185 AU (27,700 km; 17,200 mi)	0.072	2.6–5.9	30.0	—
2022-12-18	2022-12-17; G96 Mt. Lemmon Survey	2022 YJ	0.00188 AU (281,000 km; 175,000 mi)	0.733	4.3–9.7	28.9	—
2022-12-18	2022-12-19; G96 Mt. Lemmon Survey	2022 YX_{1}	0.00176 AU (263,000 km; 164,000 mi)	0.686	5.5–12	28.4	—
2022-12-22	2022-12-20; G96 Mt. Lemmon Survey	2022 YG_{2}	0.00244 AU (365,000 km; 227,000 mi)	0.948	4.5–10	28.9	—
2022-12-23	2022-12-24; G96 Mt. Lemmon Survey	2022 YW_{6}	0.00141 AU (211,000 km; 131,000 mi)	0.550	4.8–11	28.7	—
2022-12-24	2022-12-23; G96 Mt. Lemmon Survey	2022 YX_{2}	0.00154 AU (230,000 km; 143,000 mi)	0.598	5.4–12	28.5	—
2022-12-26	2022-12-27; 703 Catalina Sky Survey	2022 YA_{6}	0.000947 AU (141,700 km; 88,000 mi)	0.369	7.1–16	27.9	✓
2022-12-27	2022-12-24; K88 GINOP-KHK, Piszkesteto	2022 YR_{4}	0.00201 AU (301,000 km; 187,000 mi)	0.783	4.8–11	28.7	—

=== Warning times by size ===
This sub-section visualises the warning times of the close approaches listed in the above table, depending on the size of the asteroid. It shows the effectiveness of asteroid warning systems at detecting close approaches. The sizes of the charts show the relative sizes of the asteroids to scale. For comparison, the approximate size of a person is also shown. This is based the absolute magnitude of each asteroid, an approximate measure of size based on brightness.

Absolute magnitude H ≥ 30 (smallest)

Silhouette of man standing and facing forward

(size of a person for comparison)

Absolute magnitude 30 > H ≥ 29

Absolute magnitude 29 > H ≥ 28

Absolute magnitude 28 > H ≥ 27

Absolute magnitude 27 > H ≥ 26 (probable size of the Chelyabinsk meteor)

Absolute magnitude 26 > H ≥ 25

- After closest approach: 0 (0.0%)
- < 24 hours before: 0 (0.0%)
- up to 7 days before: 2 (100.0%)
- > one week before: 0 (0.0%)
- > 7 weeks before: 0 (0.0%)
- > one year before: 0 (0.0%)

Absolute magnitude less than 25 > H (largest)

None

== Predicted close approaches ==
- Prediction accuracy for asteroids of magnitude 27 or larger nominally predicted to pass within 1 lunar distance of Earth in 2022 (Note: Absolute magnitude 27 is the estimated magnitude of the Chelyabinsk meteor, which caused widespread damage and injury, but no deaths. Objects smaller than this are excluded.)
- Unpredicted: 13 (86.7%); Predicted but not observed: 1 (6.7%); Observed but details incorrect: 0 (0.0%); Distance correct but not date: 0 (0.0%); Date correct but not distance: 0 (0.0%); Successfully predicted: 1 (6.7%); Not due till later in the year: 0 (0.0%)

Below is the list of predicted close approaches of near-Earth asteroids larger than magnitude 27, that were predicted at the start of the year to occur in 2022. This relates to the effectiveness of asteroid cataloging systems at predicting close approaches. A predicted close approach distance of within ±50% is considered to be a successful prediction. (Note: Asteroids with a predicted close approach distance of up to 2 LD are included in the table, since a 2 LD prediction that is out by -50% will result in a 1 LD close approach.)

For asteroids which were observed but not predicted, see the main list above.

Rows highlighted orange indicate objects which were predicted theoretically but were not observed in practice

Rows highlighted yellow indicate objects which were predicted and observed but the predicted close approach date and distance were incorrect

Rows highlighted green indicate objects which were observed with the predicted close approach distance (within ±50%) but wrong date

Rows highlighted turquoise indicate objects which were observed with the predicted close approach date but wrong distance (out by over 50%)

Rows highlighted blue indicate objects which were observed as predicted with the correct close approach date and distance

Rows in grey indicate predicted objects that are not yet due

Object	Recovery Date (Note: The date that the object was reacquired i.e. the earliest date this close approach was observed)	Predicted Date of closest approach	Actual Date of closest approach	Predicted closest approach distance (Lunar distance)	Actual closest approach distance (Lunar distance)	(H) (abs. mag.)	Approx. Size (m)
2020 TO_{2}	Not observed	2022-10-15 ±4 days	Not observed	1.34–20.6 (1.39 nominal)	Not observed	26.4	14–31
2015 RN_{35}	2022-08-29	2022-12-15	2022-12-15	1.78–1.79 (1.78 nominal)	1.785 LD	23.1	64–140

== Additional examples ==
Below is an example list of near-Earth asteroids that passed or nominally will pass more than 1 lunar distance (384,400 km or 0.00256 AU) from Earth in 2022. During 2021 over 1000 asteroids passed within 10 LD (3.8 million km) of Earth.

Rows highlighted yellow indicate short arc objects that have not been observed for years and therefore the uncertainty in the approach distance and date are large

Rows highlighted red indicate objects which are risk–listed with a virtual impactor near this date

Object	Size (meters)	Nearest approach (lunar distances)	Date	Ref
2020 AP1	3–7	0.003–11 (5 LD nominal)	2022-01-07?	JPL · CAD
Planet Venus (Note: For comparison as closest Venus approach was 2022-Jan-08 at 0.2658 AU (103.4 LD). (Earth came to perihelion on 2022-Jan-04.))	—	103.4	2022-01-08	JPL
(7482) 1994 PC1	750–1300	5.15	2022-01-18	JPL · CAD
2015 DR215	220–490	17.43	2022-03-11	JPL · CAD
2022 BX1	130-280	19.98	2022-03-13	JPL · CAD
2012 TV	24–54	0.7–50 (20 LD nominal)	2022-04-05?	JPL · CAD
(418135) 2008 AG_{33}	350-780	8.43	2022-04-28	JPL · CAD
2009 JF1 (Note: 2009 JF1 was unique because it was rare to have an asteroid predicted to pass within 1 AU of the Earth (in the next year) and have better than a 1:50,000 chance of impact. Before re-measurements of the existing astrometry in February 2022, 2009 JF1 was nominally predicted to pass about 0.1 AU (15 million km; 39 LD) from Earth with a 1:3800 chance of impact.)	8-17	8.2–115 (61 LD nominal)	2022-05-15?	Nominal
Planet Mercury (Note: Mercury also passed 257 LD from Earth on January 24 and 251 LD from Earth on September 20. Mercury makes a closest approach to Earth about every 116 days.)	—	214.1	2022-05-22	JPL
(7335) 1989 JA	840–1900	10.47	2022-05-27	JPL · CAD
2022 NX1	7–14	2.11	2022-06-26	JPL · CAD
2022 PX_{1}	100–220	2.83	2022-08-12	JPL · CAD
2022 QX4	30–70	4.77	2022-08-29	JPL · CAD
161989 Cacus	990–2200	22.39	2022-09-01	JPL · CAD
65803 Didymos	700–900	27.72	2022-10-04	JPL · CAD
2022 RM4	300–670	5.98 (Note: As of 1 November 2022 the uncertainty in the close approach distance of 2022 RM4 on 1 November 2022 was ±77 km.)	2022-11-01	JPL · CAD
27 Euterpe (MBA)	96000	400	2022-11-16	JPL
(85713) 1998 SS49	2000–3500	55.02 (Note: The uncertainty region for (85713) 1998 SS49 on 2022-Nov-21 was ±28 km.)	2022-11-21	JPL · CAD
2005 LW3	400	2.97	2022-11-23	JPL · CAD
Planet Mars (Note: Mars closest approach is 2022-Dec-01 even though opposition in the sky is 2022-Dec-08. Mars close approaches occur about every 26 months (779.94 days).)	—	211.9	2022-12-01	JPL
2013 YA_{14}	50-110	2.69 (Note: The uncertainty region for 2013 YA_{14} on 2022-Dec-25 was ±9 km.)	2022-12-25	JPL · CAD
2010 XC15	140-300	2.01	2022-12-27	JPL · CAD

== See also ==
- List of asteroid close approaches to Earth
- List of asteroid close approaches to Earth in 2021
- List of asteroid close approaches to Earth in 2023
- Asteroid impact prediction
