= List of asteroid close approaches to Earth in 2023 =

Asteroids that came close to Earth in 2023

- Asteroids which came closer to Earth than the Moon in 2023 by time of discovery
- After closest approach: 62 (53.9%)
- < 24 hours before: 13 (11.3%)
- up to 7 days before: 37 (32.2%)
- > one week before: 2 (1.7%)
- > 7 weeks before: 0 (0.0%)
- > one year before: 1 (0.9%)
Other years

- Asteroids which came closer to Earth than the Moon in 2023 by discoverer
- G96 Mt. Lemmon Survey: 38 (32.5%); 703 Catalina Sky Survey: 18 (15.4%); F51 Pan-STARRS 1: 13 (11.1%); F52 Pan-STARRS 2: 12 (10.3%); K88 GINOP-KHK, Piszkesteto: 6 (5.1%); P07 SST, HEH Station: 5 (4.3%); M22 ATLAS South Africa: 5 (4.3%); W94 MAP, San Pedro de Atacama: 4 (3.4%); W68 ATLAS Chile: 3 (2.6%); L51 Gennadiy Borisov: 2 (1.7%); I41 Palomar Mountain--ZTF: 1 (0.9%); 950 La Palma: 1 (0.9%); G03 Capricornus Obs., Csokako: 1 (0.9%); V00 Kitt Peak-Bok: 1 (0.9%); I52 Steward Obs., Mt. Lemmon: 1 (0.9%); N87 Nanshan Station, Xinjiang Obs.: 1 (0.9%); U74 JPL SynTrack RT 2: 1 (0.9%); T05 ATLAS-HKO, Haleakala: 4 (3.4%)

Below is the list of asteroids that have come close to Earth in 2023.

== Timeline of known close approaches less than one lunar distance from Earth ==
A list of known near-Earth asteroid close approaches less than 1 lunar distance (0.0025696 AU (384,410 km; 238,860 mi)) from Earth in 2023, based on the close approach database of the Center for Near-Earth Object Studies (CNEOS).

For reference, the radius of Earth is about 0.0000426 AU (0.0166 LD; 6,370 km; 3,960 mi). Geosynchronous satellites have an orbit with semi-major axis length of 0.000282 AU (0.110 LD; 42,200 km; 26,200 mi).

The closest approach of Earth by an asteroid in 2023 was that of 2023 BU, an asteroid with a diameter of 3.1–6.9 m (10–23 ft), at 9,967 km (6,193 mi; 6.663×10^{−5} AU; 0.02593 LD) from the center of the Earth, or about 3,600 km (2,200 mi) above its surface. The largest asteroid to pass within 1 LD of Earth in 2023 was 2023 DZ2 at 37–83 m (121–272 ft) in diameter, for an absolute magnitude of 24.3. The fastest asteroid to pass within 1 LD of Earth in 2023 was 2023 TK_{15} that passed Earth with a velocity with respect to Earth of 21.95 km/s (49,100 mph), while the slowest bypass within lunar distance was that of 2023 XQ_{16} at a velocity with respect to Earth of 3.16 km/s (7,100 mph).

As most asteroids passing within a lunar distance are less than 40 meters in diameter, they generally are not detected until they are within several million kilometres of Earth. Objects coming from the direction of the Sun may not be publicly announced until a few days after closest approach. For example, 2023 AC_{1} was first imaged six hours after closest approach, then confirmed by other observations, but not officially announced until 3.5 days after closest approach. 2023 MD_{4} that approached from the direction of the Sun was not first observed until 3.6 days after closest approach. (Note: 2023 MD_{4} came to perihelion on 20 May 2023 and approached from the direction of the Sun. It made Earth closest approach at 20 June 2023 18:10 UT and was discovered 85.4 hours (3.56 d) later at 24 June 2023 07:36 UT.) The largest asteroid on this list that is risk–listed is 2023 SM_{5} at about 17 meters in diameter with a 3.5-day observation arc and a 1:91000 chance of Earth impact on 24 September 2118.

The CNEOS database of close approaches lists some close approaches a full orbit or more before the discovery of the object, derived by orbit calculation. The list below only includes close approaches that are evidenced by observations, thus the pre-discovery close approaches would only be included if the object was found by precovery, but there was no such close approach in 2023.

This list and relevant databases do not consider impacts as close approaches, thus this list does not include 2023 CX1, an asteroid which was predicted to impact on Earth and burned up in its atmosphere, as well as several more objects that collided with Earth's atmosphere in 2023 which weren't discovered in advance, but were observed visually or recorded by infrasound sensors designed to detect detonation of nuclear devices.

Rows highlighted red indicate objects which were not discovered until after closest approach

Rows highlighted yellow indicate objects discovered less than 24 hours before closest approach

Rows highlighted green indicate objects discovered more than one week before closest approach

Rows highlighted turquoise indicate objects discovered more than 7 weeks before closest approach

Rows highlighted blue indicate objects discovered more than one year before closest approach
(i.e. objects successfully cataloged on a previous orbit, rather than being detected during final approach)

Date of closest approach	Discovery (Note: Discovery date (first reported image), and if the object was confirmed and previously undiscovered, the discoverer)	Object	Nominal geocentric distance (Note: Distance from the center of Earth to the center of the object. See the NASA/JPL Solar System Dynamics Glossary: Geocentric. Earth has a radius of approximately 6,400 km (0.0166 LD).)	Uncertainty region (3-sigma)	Approx. size (m)	(H) (abs. mag.)	Closer approach to Moon (Note: Objects that approached closer to the Moon than Earth are marked with a check.)
2023-01-12	2023-01-13; G96 Mt. Lemmon Survey	2023 AC_{1}	243,450 km (151,300 mi; 0.001627 AU; 0.6333 LD)	± 1,085 km (674 mi)	4.2–9.5	29.0	—
2023-01-12	2023-01-13; 703 Catalina Sky Survey	2023 AV	15,551 km (9,663 mi; 0.0001040 AU; 0.04045 LD)	± 148 km (92 mi)	2.0–4.4	30.7	—
2023-01-15	2023-01-15; P07 SST, HEH Station	2023 AN_{6}	97,977 km (60,880 mi; 0.0006549 AU; 0.2549 LD)	± 1,153 km (716 mi)	2.0–4.4	30.6	?
2023-01-21	2023-01-22; F52 Pan-STARRS 2	2023 BY_{2}	253,287 km (157,400 mi; 0.001693 AU; 0.6589 LD)	± 204 km (127 mi)	3.4–7.5	29.5	✓
2023-01-25	2023-01-27; G96 Mt. Lemmon Survey	2023 BX_{5}	335,316 km (208,400 mi; 0.002241 AU; 0.8723 LD)	± 643 km (400 mi)	5.5–12	28.4	—
2023-01-25	2023-01-18; F52 Pan-STARRS 2	2023 BL_{1}	224,640 km (139,600 mi; 0.001502 AU; 0.5844 LD)	± 232 km (144 mi)	15–34	26.2	—
2023-01-26	2023-01-24; F52 Pan-STARRS 2	2023 BL_{2}	370,777 km (230,400 mi; 0.002478 AU; 0.9646 LD)	± 474 km (295 mi)	4.0–8.9	29.1	—
2023-01-27	2023-01-21; L51 Gennadiy Borisov	2023 BU	9,967 km (6,193 mi; 6.663×10^{−5} AU; 0.02593 LD)	± 0 km (0 mi)	3.1–6.9	29.7	—
2023-01-27	2023-01-26; G96 Mt. Lemmon Survey	2023 BZ_{3}	281,240 km (174,800 mi; 0.001880 AU; 0.7316 LD)	± 755 km (469 mi)	4.1–9.1	29.1	—
2023-01-30	2023-02-01; M22 ATLAS South Africa	2023 CK	105,221 km (65,380 mi; 0.0007034 AU; 0.2737 LD)	± 230 km (140 mi)	10–23	27.0	—
2023-01-30	2023-01-29; K88 GINOP-KHK, Piszkesteto	2023 BJ_{7}	370,808 km (230,400 mi; 0.002479 AU; 0.9646 LD)	± 509 km (316 mi)	4.7–11	28.8	✓ (Note: 2023 BJ_{7} passed 12,884 ± 334 km (8,006 ± 208 mi) from the centerpoint of the Moon around 30 January 2023 13:34 UT. Since the Moon has a radius of about 1,738 km (1,080 mi), it passed approximately 11,146 ± 334 km (6,926 ± 208 mi) from the surface of the Moon.)
2023-02-09	2023-02-12; G96 Mt. Lemmon Survey	2023 CG_{4}	274,611 km (170,600 mi; 0.001836 AU; 0.7144 LD)	± 5,022 km (3,121 mi)	3.8–8.5	29.2	—
2023-02-25	2023-02-24; K88 GINOP-KHK, Piszkesteto	2023 DR	75,888 km (47,150 mi; 0.0005073 AU; 0.1974 LD)	± 43 km (27 mi)	2.8–6.2	29.9	—
2023-03-09	2023-03-10; 703 Catalina Sky Survey	2023 EN	135,777 km (84,370 mi; 0.0009076 AU; 0.3532 LD)	± 185 km (115 mi)	6.4–14	28.1	—
2023-03-12	2023-03-14; G96 Mt. Lemmon Survey	2023 ET_{2}	157,216 km (97,690 mi; 0.001051 AU; 0.4090 LD)	± 3,158 km (1,962 mi)	2.1–4.6	30.6	—
2023-03-17	2023-03-13; M22 ATLAS South Africa	2023 EY	239,565 km (148,900 mi; 0.001601 AU; 0.6232 LD)	± 38 km (24 mi)	12–26	26.8	—
2023-03-18	2023-03-18; P07 SST, HEH Station	2023 FX_{48}	222,903 km (138,500 mi; 0.001490 AU; 0.5799 LD)	± 9,082 km (5,643 mi)	1.4–3.1	31.4	?
2023-03-19	2023-03-17; I41 Palomar Mountain--ZTF	2023 FO	345,284 km (214,500 mi; 0.002308 AU; 0.8982 LD)	± 618 km (384 mi)	3.4–7.7	29.4	—
2023-03-20	2023-03-20; P07 SST, HEH Station	2023 FZ_{48}	179,956 km (111,800 mi; 0.001203 AU; 0.4681 LD)	± 1,474 km (916 mi)	3.3–7.4	29.5	?
2023-03-25	2023-03-26; F51 Pan-STARRS 1	2023 FN_{6}	227,368 km (141,300 mi; 0.001520 AU; 0.5915 LD)	± 426 km (265 mi)	4.0–9.0	29.1	—
2023-03-25	2023-02-27; 950 La Palma	2023 DZ2	174,644 km (108,500 mi; 0.001167 AU; 0.4543 LD)	± 1 km (0.62 mi)	37–83	24.3	—
2023-03-30	2023-03-28; G96 Mt. Lemmon Survey	2023 FH_{7}	165,363 km (102,800 mi; 0.001105 AU; 0.4302 LD)	± 299 km (186 mi)	4.6–10	28.8	—
2023-04-11	2023-04-11; K88 GINOP-KHK, Piszkesteto	2023 GQ	133,880 km (83,190 mi; 0.0008949 AU; 0.3483 LD)	± 143 km (89 mi)	5.5–12	28.4	—
2023-04-11	2023-04-14; F52 Pan-STARRS 2	2023 GP_{3}	259,165 km (161,000 mi; 0.001732 AU; 0.6742 LD)	± 910 km (570 mi)	5.1–11	28.6	—
2023-04-14	2023-04-16; W68 ATLAS Chile	2023 HE	307,047 km (190,800 mi; 0.002052 AU; 0.7988 LD)	± 591 km (367 mi)	7.7–17	27.7	—
2023-04-15	2023-04-16; G96 Mt. Lemmon Survey	2023 HZ	287,201 km (178,500 mi; 0.001920 AU; 0.7471 LD)	± 1,155 km (718 mi)	4.1–9.1	29.1	—
2023-04-17	2023-04-16; G96 Mt. Lemmon Survey	2023 HB	195,112 km (121,200 mi; 0.001304 AU; 0.5076 LD)	± 753 km (468 mi)	2.1–4.8	30.5	—
2023-04-17	2023-04-17; P07 SST, HEH Station	2023 HW_{39}	241,880 km (150,300 mi; 0.001617 AU; 0.6292 LD)	± 2,899 km (1,801 mi)	1.1–2.4	32.0	?
2023-04-18	2023-04-16; F52 Pan-STARRS 2	2023 HH	143,801 km (89,350 mi; 0.0009613 AU; 0.3741 LD)	± 108 km (67 mi)	4.3–9.6	29.0	—
2023-04-18	2023-04-17; G96 Mt. Lemmon Survey	2023 HT	177,830 km (110,500 mi; 0.001189 AU; 0.4626 LD)	± 150 km (93 mi)	2.7–6.0	30.0	—
2023-04-18	2023-04-17; G96 Mt. Lemmon Survey	2023 HO_{36}	186,803 km (116,100 mi; 0.001249 AU; 0.4860 LD)	± 610 km (380 mi)	2.1–4.6	30.6	?
2023-04-20	2023-04-17; G96 Mt. Lemmon Survey	2023 HK	341,101 km (212,000 mi; 0.002280 AU; 0.8874 LD)	± 150 km (93 mi)	9.7–22	27.2	✓
2023-04-23	2023-04-22; G96 Mt. Lemmon Survey	2023 HW_{3}	209,009 km (129,900 mi; 0.001397 AU; 0.5437 LD)	± 261 km (162 mi)	4.4–9.8	28.9	—
2023-04-30	2023-04-29; G96 Mt. Lemmon Survey	2023 HD_{7}	231,787 km (144,000 mi; 0.001549 AU; 0.6030 LD)	± 244 km (152 mi)	5.1–11	28.6	✓
2023-05-08	2023-05-09; 703 Catalina Sky Survey	2023 JO	92,277 km (57,340 mi; 0.0006168 AU; 0.2401 LD)	± 249 km (155 mi)	3.8–8.6	29.2	—
2023-05-09	2023-05-08; 703 Catalina Sky Survey	2023 JF	320,322 km (199,000 mi; 0.002141 AU; 0.8333 LD)	± 177 km (110 mi)	7.8–18	27.6	✓
2023-05-12	2023-05-13; G96 Mt. Lemmon Survey	2023 JA_{3}	132,389 km (82,260 mi; 0.0008850 AU; 0.3444 LD)	± 518 km (322 mi)	3.0–6.7	29.7	—
2023-05-17	2023-05-19; G03 Capricornus Observatory, Csokako	2023 KT	166,824 km (103,700 mi; 0.001115 AU; 0.4340 LD)	± 267 km (166 mi)	5.7–13	28.4	—
2023-05-22	2023-05-20; G96 Mt. Lemmon Survey	2023 KS	234,653 km (145,800 mi; 0.001569 AU; 0.6104 LD)	± 317 km (197 mi)	7.8–18	27.6	—
2023-05-27	2023-05-28; 703 Catalina Sky Survey	2023 KK_{4}	345,234 km (214,500 mi; 0.002308 AU; 0.8981 LD)	± 1,419 km (882 mi)	8.2–18	27.6	—
2023-05-27	2023-05-28; 703 Catalina Sky Survey	2023 KU_{4}	290,726 km (180,600 mi; 0.001943 AU; 0.7563 LD)	± 627 km (390 mi)	6.2–14	28.2	✓
2023-06-07	2023-06-07; 703 Catalina Sky Survey	2023 LC	271,328 km (168,600 mi; 0.001814 AU; 0.7058 LD)	± 55 km (34 mi)	4.9–11	28.7	—
2023-06-09	2023-06-10; W68 ATLAS Chile	2023 LS	88,971 km (55,280 mi; 0.0005947 AU; 0.2315 LD)	± 46 km (29 mi)	2.7–6.1	29.9	—
2023-06-13	2023-06-14; G96 Mt. Lemmon Survey	2023 LP_{1}	255,876 km (159,000 mi; 0.001710 AU; 0.6656 LD)	± 494 km (307 mi)	3.1–6.8	29.7	—
2023-06-14	2023-06-10; F52 Pan-STARRS 2	2023 LZ	317,022 km (197,000 mi; 0.002119 AU; 0.8247 LD)	± 407 km (253 mi)	13–30	26.5	—
2023-06-15	2023-06-14; G96 Mt. Lemmon Survey	2023 LM_{1}	110,564 km (68,700 mi; 0.0007391 AU; 0.2876 LD)	± 71 km (44 mi)	5.3–12	28.5	—
2023-06-17	2023-06-15; F52 Pan-STARRS 2	2023 LE_{2}	157,818 km (98,060 mi; 0.001055 AU; 0.4106 LD)	± 80 km (50 mi)	2.6–5.7	30.1	0
2023-06-18	2023-06-18; G96 Mt. Lemmon Survey	2023 MJ_{20}	44,592 km (27,710 mi; 0.0002981 AU; 0.1160 LD)	± 108 km (67 mi)	1.9–4.1	30.8	?
2023-06-20	2023-06-21; F51 Pan-STARRS 1	2023 MB_{3}	157,035 km (97,580 mi; 0.001050 AU; 0.4085 LD)	± 127 km (79 mi)	2.7–5.9	30.0	—
2023-06-20	2023-06-24; W94 MAP, San Pedro de Atacama	2023 MD_{4}	289,756 km (180,000 mi; 0.001937 AU; 0.7538 LD)	± 528 km (328 mi)	12–26	26.8	—
2023-06-23	2023-06-22; G96 Mt. Lemmon Survey	2023 MW_{2}	123,724 km (76,880 mi; 0.0008270 AU; 0.3219 LD)	± 62 km (39 mi)	2.7–6.0	30.0	—
2023-06-24	2023-06-21; F51 Pan-STARRS 1	2023 ML_{3}	260,454 km (161,800 mi; 0.001741 AU; 0.6776 LD)	± 300 km (190 mi)	5.6–13	28.4	—
2023-06-25	2023-06-21; F51 Pan-STARRS 1	2023 MU_{2}	216,995 km (134,800 mi; 0.001451 AU; 0.5645 LD)	± 23 km (14 mi)	4.0–9.0	29.1	—
2023-07-05	2023-07-08; G96 Mt. Lemmon Survey	2023 NO	381,548 km (237,100 mi; 0.002550 AU; 0.9926 LD)	± 768 km (477 mi)	4.9–11	28.6	—
2023-07-13	2023-07-15; M22 ATLAS South Africa	2023 NT1	100,892 km (62,690 mi; 0.0006744 AU; 0.2625 LD)	± 18 km (11 mi)	26–58	25.0	—
2023-08-18	2023-08-20; K88 GINOP-KHK, Piszkesteto	2023 QY	66,911 km (41,580 mi; 0.0004473 AU; 0.1741 LD)	± 580 km (360 mi)	5.0–11	28.6	—
2023-08-19	2023-08-20; K88 GINOP-KHK, Piszkesteto	2023 QS_{1}	107,145 km (66,580 mi; 0.0007162 AU; 0.2787 LD)	± 113 km (70 mi)	5.0–11	28.6	—
2023-08-20	2023-08-19; F51 Pan-STARRS 1	2023 QR	207,604 km (129,000 mi; 0.001388 AU; 0.5401 LD)	± 241 km (150 mi)	3.7–8.2	29.3	—
2023-09-05	2023-09-08; F51 Pan-STARRS 1	2023 RM_{16}	350,689 km (217,900 mi; 0.002344 AU; 0.9123 LD)	± 543 km (337 mi)	4.4–9.9	28.9	—
2023-09-06	2023-09-06; P07 SST, HEH Station	2023 RF_{156}	362,180 km (225,000 mi; 0.002421 AU; 0.9422 LD)	± 714 km (444 mi)	3.1–7.0	29.7	?
2023-09-07	2023-09-07; G96 Mt. Lemmon Survey	2023 RS	10,361 km (6,438 mi; 6.926×10^{−5} AU; 0.02695 LD)	± 16 km (9.9 mi)	0.91–2.0	32.3	—
2023-09-07	2023-09-10; W94 MAP, San Pedro de Atacama	2023 RG_{22}	381,766 km (237,200 mi; 0.002552 AU; 0.9931 LD)	± 7,551 km (4,692 mi)	16–35	26.1	—
2023-09-08	2023-09-09; G96 Mt. Lemmon Survey	2023 RY_{2}	189,304 km (117,600 mi; 0.001265 AU; 0.4925 LD)	± 431 km (268 mi)	5.8–13	28.3	—
2023-09-09	2023-09-10; L51 Gennadiy Borisov	2023 RK_{5}	281,889 km (175,200 mi; 0.001884 AU; 0.7333 LD)	± 449 km (279 mi)	4.0–9.0	29.1	—
2023-09-13	2023-09-11; F52 Pan-STARRS 2	2023 RR_{5}	207,382 km (128,900 mi; 0.001386 AU; 0.5395 LD)	± 121 km (75 mi)	4.7–11	28.8	—
2023-09-16	2023-09-18; G96 Mt. Lemmon Survey	2023 SR_{5}	174,519 km (108,400 mi; 0.001167 AU; 0.4540 LD)	± 1,218 km (757 mi)	4.9–11	28.7	—
2023-09-18	2023-09-19; G96 Mt. Lemmon Survey	2023 SC_{2}	173,894 km (108,100 mi; 0.001162 AU; 0.4524 LD)	± 410 km (250 mi)	3.7–8.2	29.3	—
2023-09-20	2023-09-19; G96 Mt. Lemmon Survey	2023 SN_{1}	331,882 km (206,200 mi; 0.002218 AU; 0.8634 LD)	± 389 km (242 mi)	3.6–8.1	29.3	✓
2023-09-20	2023-09-21; 703 Catalina Sky Survey	2023 SL_{5}	51,870 km (32,230 mi; 0.0003467 AU; 0.1349 LD)	± 187 km (116 mi)	4.6–10	28.8	—
2023-09-23	2023-09-19; F52 Pan-STARRS 2	2023 SM_{5}	376,207 km (233,800 mi; 0.002515 AU; 0.9787 LD)	± 1,326 km (824 mi)	14–32	26.4	✓
2023-09-24	2023-09-22; M22 ATLAS South Africa	2023 SN_{8}	230,879 km (143,500 mi; 0.001543 AU; 0.6006 LD)	± 2,047 km (1,272 mi)	6.6–15	28.0	?
2023-09-24	2023-09-18; F52 Pan-STARRS 2	2023 SP_{3}	328,649 km (204,200 mi; 0.002197 AU; 0.8550 LD)	± 239 km (149 mi)	12–28	26.6	—
2023-09-25	2023-09-26; K88 GINOP-KHK, Piszkesteto	2023 SH_{7}	53,782 km (33,420 mi; 0.0003595 AU; 0.1399 LD)	± 34 km (21 mi)	1.3–2.8	31.6	—
2023-10-03	2023-10-05; G96 Mt. Lemmon Survey	2023 TY	204,816 km (127,300 mi; 0.001369 AU; 0.5328 LD)	± 729 km (453 mi)	3.9–8.8	29.1	?
2023-10-07	2023-10-06; G96 Mt. Lemmon Survey	2023 TR_{1}	107,778 km (66,970 mi; 0.0007205 AU; 0.2804 LD)	± 96 km (60 mi)	2.9–6.4	29.8	?
2023-10-07	2023-10-05; G96 Mt. Lemmon Survey	2023 TB_{1}	260,902 km (162,100 mi; 0.001744 AU; 0.6787 LD)	± 536 km (333 mi)	3.7–8.2	29.3	?
2023-10-07	2023-10-09; G96 Mt. Lemmon Survey	2023 TK_{4}	203,696 km (126,600 mi; 0.001362 AU; 0.5299 LD)	± 2,225 km (1,383 mi)	4.8–11	28.7	?
2023-10-07	2023-10-09; G96 Mt. Lemmon Survey	2023 TJ_{4}	297,353 km (184,800 mi; 0.001988 AU; 0.7735 LD)	± 604 km (375 mi)	3.6–7.9	29.4	?
2023-10-10	2023-10-11; F51 Pan-STARRS 1	2023 TZ_{65}	179,904 km (111,800 mi; 0.001203 AU; 0.4680 LD)	± 345 km (214 mi)	3.2–7.0	29.6	?
2023-10-10	2023-10-08; 703 Catalina Sky Survey	2023 TM_{3}	165,596 km (102,900 mi; 0.001107 AU; 0.4308 LD)	± 35 km (22 mi)	11–24	26.9	?
2023-10-12	2023-10-07; F51 Pan-STARRS 1	2023 TV_{3}	83,294 km (51,760 mi; 0.0005568 AU; 0.2167 LD)	± 91 km (57 mi)	7.5–17	27.8	?
2023-10-12	2023-10-15; F51 Pan-STARRS 1	2023 TU_{15}	291,593 km (181,200 mi; 0.001949 AU; 0.7586 LD)	± 643 km (400 mi)	3.9–8.8	29.2	?
2023-10-14	2023-10-11; G96 Mt. Lemmon Survey	2023 TD_{7}	171,460 km (106,500 mi; 0.001146 AU; 0.4460 LD)	± 199 km (124 mi)	3.8–8.6	29.2	?
2023-10-14	2023-10-15; 703 Catalina Sky Survey	2023 TO_{17}	54,346 km (33,770 mi; 0.0003633 AU; 0.1414 LD)	± 54 km (34 mi)	3.1–6.9	29.7	?
2023-10-14	2023-10-17; V00 Kitt Peak-Bok	2023 UY	155,572 km (96,670 mi; 0.001040 AU; 0.4047 LD)	± 324 km (201 mi)	2.7–6.1	30.0	?
2023-10-15	2023-10-16; 703 Catalina Sky Survey	2023 UB	58,638 km (36,440 mi; 0.0003920 AU; 0.1525 LD)	± 43 km (27 mi)	2.6–5.8	30.1	?
2023-10-18	2023-10-17; F52 Pan-STARRS 2	2023 UX_{2}	202,983 km (126,100 mi; 0.001357 AU; 0.5280 LD)	± 193 km (120 mi)	3.3–7.5	29.5	?
2023-10-18	2023-10-20; F51 Pan-STARRS 1	2023 UH_{9}	104,456 km (64,910 mi; 0.0006982 AU; 0.2717 LD)	± 502 km (312 mi)	1.8–4.1	30.8	?
2023-10-20	2023-10-21; F51 Pan-STARRS 1	2023 UR_{10}	13,949 km (8,668 mi; 9.324×10^{−5} AU; 0.03629 LD)	± 55 km (34 mi)	2.7–6.1	30.0	?
2023-10-20	2023-10-14; G96 Mt. Lemmon Survey	2023 TK_{15}	379,647 km (235,900 mi; 0.002538 AU; 0.9876 LD)	± 43 km (27 mi)	18–39	25.9	?
2023-11-02	2023-11-01; I52 Steward Observatory, Mt. Lemmon Station	2023 VA	26,760 km (16,630 mi; 0.0001789 AU; 0.06961 LD)	± 8 km (5.0 mi)	5.1–11	28.6	?
2023-11-02	2023-11-03; 703 Catalina Sky Survey	2023 VG	114,161 km (70,940 mi; 0.0007631 AU; 0.2970 LD)	± 63 km (39 mi)	5.9–13	28.3	?
2023-11-04	2023-11-04; 703 Catalina Sky Survey	2023 VE_{1}	34,493 km (21,430 mi; 0.0002306 AU; 0.08973 LD)	± 27 km (17 mi)	2.4–5.4	30.2	?
2023-11-04	2023-11-05; 703 Catalina Sky Survey	2023 VO_{1}	78,132 km (48,550 mi; 0.0005223 AU; 0.2033 LD)	± 101 km (63 mi)	3.2–7.1	29.6	?
2023-11-07	2023-11-03; F52 Pan-STARRS 2	2023 VS	368,141 km (228,800 mi; 0.002461 AU; 0.9577 LD)	± 328 km (204 mi)	2.9–6.4	29.8	?
2023-11-07	2023-11-05; N87 Nanshan Station, Xinjiang Observatory	2023 VB_{2}	32,770 km (20,360 mi; 0.0002191 AU; 0.08525 LD)	± 17 km (11 mi)	6.0–13	28.2	?
2023-11-07	2023-11-08; G96 Mt. Lemmon Survey	2023 VP_{3}	132,278 km (82,190 mi; 0.0008842 AU; 0.3441 LD)	± 26 km (16 mi)	3.4–7.5	29.5	?
2023-11-07	2023-11-06; G96 Mt. Lemmon Survey	2023 VD_{2}	56,171 km (34,900 mi; 0.0003755 AU; 0.1461 LD)	± 35 km (22 mi)	2.6–5.7	30.1	?
2023-11-08	2023-11-09; M22 ATLAS South Africa	2023 VC_{4}	384,221 km (238,700 mi; 0.002568 AU; 0.9995 LD)	± 232 km (144 mi)	11–24	27.0	?
2023-11-10	2023-11-08; G96 Mt. Lemmon Survey	2023 VD_{4}	144,665 km (89,890 mi; 0.0009670 AU; 0.3763 LD)	± 433 km (269 mi)	6.1–14	28.2	?
2023-11-17	2023-11-16; W68 ATLAS Chile, Rio Hurtado	2023 WA	27,379 km (17,010 mi; 0.0001830 AU; 0.07122 LD)	± 13 km (8.1 mi)	5.3–12	28.5	?
2023-11-19	2023-11-22; 703 Catalina Sky Survey	2023 WE_{2}	242,747 km (150,800 mi; 0.001623 AU; 0.6315 LD)	± 427 km (265 mi)	10–23	27.0	?
2023-11-20	2023-11-21; 703 Catalina Sky Survey	2023 WZ_{1}	157,393 km (97,800 mi; 0.001052 AU; 0.4094 LD)	± 159 km (99 mi)	4.3–9.7	28.9	?
2023-11-30	2023-12-06; 703 Catalina Sky Survey	2023 XG_{4}	175,493 km (109,000 mi; 0.001173 AU; 0.4565 LD)	± 544 km (338 mi)	7.1–16	27.9	?
2023-12-02	2023-12-03; G96 Mt. Lemmon Survey	2023 XJ	105,643 km (65,640 mi; 0.0007062 AU; 0.2748 LD)	± 140 km (87 mi)	4.9–11	28.7	?
2023-12-03	2023-12-05; U74 – JPL SynTrack Robotic Telescope 2, Auberry	2023 XL_{2}	110,908 km (68,920 mi; 0.0007414 AU; 0.2885 LD)	± 163 km (101 mi)	2.5–5.5	30.2	?
2023-12-06	2023-12-04; F51 Pan-STARRS 1	2023 XJ_{1}	98,205 km (61,020 mi; 0.0006565 AU; 0.2555 LD)	± 86 km (53 mi)	7.9–18	27.6	?
2023-12-08	2023-12-11; W94 MAP, San Pedro de Atacama	2023 XQ_{10}	222,851 km (138,500 mi; 0.001490 AU; 0.5797 LD)	± 1,349 km (838 mi)	14–31	26.4	?
2023-12-08	2023-12-09; T05 ATLAS-HKO, Haleakala	2023 XU_{5}	370,845 km (230,400 mi; 0.002479 AU; 0.9647 LD)	± 263 km (163 mi)	9.7–22	27.2	?
2023-12-09	2023-12-10; W94 MAP, San Pedro de Atacama	2023 XW_{5}	74,186 km (46,100 mi; 0.0004959 AU; 0.1930 LD)	± 46 km (29 mi)	4.9–11	28.7	?
2023-12-09	2023-12-03; G96 Mt. Lemmon Survey	2023 XB_{4}	296,661 km (184,300 mi; 0.001983 AU; 0.7717 LD)	± 294 km (183 mi)	6.1–14	28.2	?
2023-12-13	2023-12-15; 703 Catalina Sky Survey	2023 XQ_{16}	126,364 km (78,520 mi; 0.0008447 AU; 0.3287 LD)	± 96 km (60 mi)	2.0–4.6	30.6	?
2023-12-23	2023-12-17; G96 Mt. Lemmon Survey	2023 YP	356,680 km (221,600 mi; 0.002384 AU; 0.9279 LD)	± 850 km (530 mi)	6.7–15	28.0	?
2023-12-23	2020-12-23	2020 YO_{3}	215,222 km (133,700 mi; 0.001439 AU; 0.5599 LD)	± 7 km (4.3 mi)	30–67	24.7	?
2023-12-31	2024-01-02; F51 Pan-STARRS 1	2024 AL	357,800 km (222,300 mi; 0.002392 AU; 0.9308 LD)	± 511 km (318 mi)	7.7–17	27.7	?

=== Warning times by size ===
This sub-section visualises the warning times of the close approaches listed in the above table, depending on the size of the asteroid. The sizes of the charts show the relative sizes of the asteroids to scale. For comparison, the approximate size of a person is also shown. This is based the absolute magnitude of each asteroid, an approximate measure of size based on brightness.

Absolute magnitude H ≥ 30 (smallest)

Silhouette of man standing and facing forward

(size of a person for comparison)

Absolute magnitude 30 > H ≥ 29

Absolute magnitude 29 > H ≥ 28

Absolute magnitude 28 > H ≥ 27

Absolute magnitude 27 > H ≥ 26

Absolute magnitude 26 > H ≥ 25

Absolute magnitude 25 > H (largest)

- After closest approach: 0 (0.0%)
- < 24 hours before: 0 (0.0%)
- up to 7 days before: 0 (0.0%)
- > one week before: 1 (50.0%)
- > 7 weeks before: 0 (0.0%)
- > one year before: 1 (50.0%)

== Beyond 1 LD ==
Below is an example list of near-Earth asteroids that nominally will pass more than 1 lunar distance (384,400 km or 0.00256 AU) from Earth in 2023. During 2022, over 1,000 asteroids passed within 10 LD (3.8 million km) of Earth.

Rows highlighted grey indicate a planet or main-belt asteroid

Rows highlighted green indicate a comet which may have a larger uncertainty region due to non-gravitational forces from outgassing (sublimation).
It is also more difficult to make astrometric measurements of the precise location of the nucleus because it is masked by a fuzzy coma.

Rows highlighted yellow indicate short arc objects that have not been observed for years and therefore the uncertainty in the approach distance and date are large

Rows highlighted cyan indicate objects that had a short observation arc with large uncertainties that were recovered and their orbits greatly refined

Rows highlighted red indicate objects which are risk–listed with a virtual impactor near this date

Object	Size (meters)	Nearest approach (lunar distances)	Date	Ref
2022 YY_{6}	16-35	2.1 (Note: The uncertainty region for 2022 YY_{6} on 2023-Jan-02 was ±6500 km.)	2023-01-02	JPL · CAD
2014 LJ	5.3-12	3.9–12.2 (4.7 LD nominal)	2023-01-14?	JPL · CAD
2012 BV_{13} (Note: 2012 BV_{13} was recovered by WISE in October 2022 and followed up by several observatories in January 2023.)	100-220	12.11 (Note: The uncertainty region for 2012 BV_{13} on 2023-Jan-16 was ±103 km.)	2023-01-16	JPL · CAD
2020 BP	19-43	9.26 (Note: was 0.43–40 (5 LD nominal) before recovery on 14 January 2023 by Pan-STARRS 2)	2023-01-19	JPL · CAD
C/2022 E3 (ZTF)	≈1,000??	110.5 (Note: The uncertainty region for C/2022 E3 (ZTF) on 2023-Feb-01 was ±500 km.)	2023-02-01	JPL · CAD
(367789) 2011 AG5	110–250	4.73 (Note: 2011 AG_{5} brightened to about apmag 14.2 on 2023-Feb-02.)	2023-02-03	JPL · CAD
(199145) 2005 YY_{128}	580-1300	11.96 (Note: The uncertainty region for 2005 YY_{128} on 2023-Feb-16 was ±10 km. It brightened to about apmag 13.2 on 2023-Feb-14.)	2023-02-16	JPL · CAD
2023 DW	37-82	22.7	2023-02-18	JPL · CAD
2020 DG_{4} (Note: At the start of the year 2020 DG_{4} had the closest known nominal approach to Earth in 2023 at 1.4 LD.)	6-14	1.62 (Note: was 1.2–11 (1.4 LD nominal) before recovery on 22 February 2023 by ATLAS South Africa)	2023-02-18	JPL · CAD
(37638) 1993 VB	370-820	16.98 (Note: The uncertainty region for 1993 VB on 2023-Feb-21 was ±57 km. It brightened to about apmag 14.5 on 2023-Feb-25.)	2023-02-21	JPL · CAD
405 Thia (MBA)	109,000	411.5	2023-03-20	JPL
2023 FM	130-280	7.8 (Note: The uncertainty region for 2023 FM on 2023-Apr-06 is ±3200 km. It brightened to apmag 14.8 on 2023-Apr-04.)	2023-04-06	JPL · CAD
364P/PANSTARRS	≈300?	46.98 (Note: The uncertainty region for 364P/PANSTARRS on 2023-Apr-07 is ±47 km.)	2023-04-07	JPL · CAD
4486 Mithra	1,850	63.31	2023-04-11	JPL · CAD
(436774) 2012 KY_{3}	540–1200	12.4 (Note: The uncertainty region for 2012 KY_{3} on 2023-Apr-13 was ±305 km. It brightened to apmag 14.2 on 2023-Apr-16.)	2023-04-13	JPL · CAD
2006 HV_{5}	300	6.29 (Note: The uncertainty region for 2006 HV_{5} on 2023-Apr-26 is ±36 km. It brightened to apmag 15.3 on 2023-Apr-24.)	2023-04-26	JPL · CAD
1627 Ivar	9,120	289.6	2023-04-29	JPL
Planet Mercury (Note: Mercury also will pass 260.9 LD from Earth on January 8, 244.4 LD from Earth on September 3, and 263.2 LD from Earth on December 23. Mercury makes a closest approach to Earth about every 116 days.)	—	217.7	2023-05-04	JPL
453 Tea (MBA)	24,000	366.3	2023-05-05	JPL
2012 KP24	14-31	0.19–24 (10 LD nominal)	2023-05-31?	JPL · CAD
2016 LP_{10} (Note: The asteroid with the greatest chance of impacting Earth in 2023 is 2016 LP_{10} (4-meters in diameter) with less than a 1-day observation arc. It has a 1:53,000 chance of impact on 10 June 2023, but is expected to be around 0.63 AU (94 million km; 250 LD) from Earth on that date at a basically undetectable apparent magnitude of 31. Such an impact would be similar to 2008 TC3.)	4-8	Impact–600 (245 LD nominal)	2023-06-10?	Nominal
(488453) 1994 XD	600	8.23 (Note: The uncertainty region for 1994 XD on 2023-Jun-12 is ±17 km. It is expected to brighten to apmag 13.5 on 2023-Jun-10 and best seen from the Northern hemisphere.)	2023-06-12	JPL · CAD
2020 DB_{5}	380-850	11.2 (Note: The uncertainty region for 2020 DB_{5} on 2023-Jun-15 is ±51 km. It is expected to brighten to apmag 13.8 on 2023-Jun-14 and best seen from the Southern hemisphere.)	2023-06-15	JPL · CAD
(467336) 2002 LT38	200–450	17.32	2023-06-24	JPL · CAD
2023 HO_{6}	180-390	5.3 (Note: The uncertainty region for 2020 HO_{6} on 2023-Jul-05 is ±700 km. It is expected to brighten to apmag 13.5 on 2023-Jul-05 and best seen from the Southern hemisphere.)	2023-07-05	JPL · CAD
2019 LH_{5}	210-470	14.89	2023-07-07	JPL · CAD
237P/LINEAR		414.1	2023-07-08	JPL
2018 UY	180-410	7.41	2023-07-12	JPL · CAD
(490684) 2010 LL_{34}	350-780	30.04	2023-07-13	JPL · CAD
C/2021 T4 (Lemmon)		210.6	2023-07-20	JPL
2019 GL_{5}	260	20.82	2023-07-29	JPL · CAD
2006 AD	1585	68.39	2023-07-29	JPL · CAD
Planet Venus (Note: For comparison as the closest Venus approach is 2023-Aug-13 at 0.2887 AU (112.4 LD).)	—	112.4	2023-08-13	JPL
4769 Castalia	1,400	42.82	2023-08-22	JPL · CAD
8 Flora (MBA)	147,000	387.1	2023-09-02	JPL
2016 LY_{48}	77-170	5.01 (Note: was 4.3–8.7 (4.3 LD nominal) before recovery on 19 June 2023 by Canada–France–Hawaii Telescope)	2023-09-16	JPL · CAD
(523598) 2003 ED_{50}	231	19.75	2023-09-20	JPL · CAD
103P/Hartley	≈2,000	148.9 (Note: The uncertainty region for 103P/Hartley on 2023-Sep-26 is ±310 km.)	2023-09-26	JPL · CAD
2022 UX_{1}	7-15	1.9–5.2 (3.1 LD nominal)	2023-10-12	JPL · CAD
2021 NT_{14}	245	18.54	2023-10-13	JPL · CAD
1998 HH_{49}	140-320	3.05 (Note: The uncertainty region for 1998 HH_{49} on 2023-Oct-17 is ±471 km.)	2023-10-17	JPL · CAD
4544 Xanthus	1,300	76.10	2023-10-21	JPL · CAD
18 Melpomene (MBA)	140,000	334.2	2023-10-30	JPL
(525229) 2004 UU_{1}	150–330	10.61	2023-10-30	JPL · CAD
(363505) 2003 UC_{20}	1,900	13.66	2023-11-02	JPL · CAD
(164121) 2003 YT1	1,720	23.10	2023-11-03	JPL · CAD
C/2023 H2 (Lemmon)		75 (Note: The uncertainty region for C/2023 H2 (Lemmon) on 2023-Nov-10 is ±57000 km. It might brighten to magnitude 10, but will stay within 75 degrees of the Sun when brightest.)	2023-11-10	JPL · CAD
(7350) 1993 VA	1,900	50.36	2023-11-14	JPL · CAD
(341843) 2008 EV5	400	16.4	2023-12-20	JPL · CAD
2020 YO_{3}	30-70	0.5–30 (3.5 LD nominal)	2023-12-23?	JPL · CAD

== See also ==
- List of asteroid close approaches to Earth
- List of asteroid close approaches to Earth in 2022
- List of asteroid close approaches to Earth in 2024
- Asteroid impact prediction
