= 2022 RM4 =

Near-Earth asteroid 2022

2022 RM_{4}
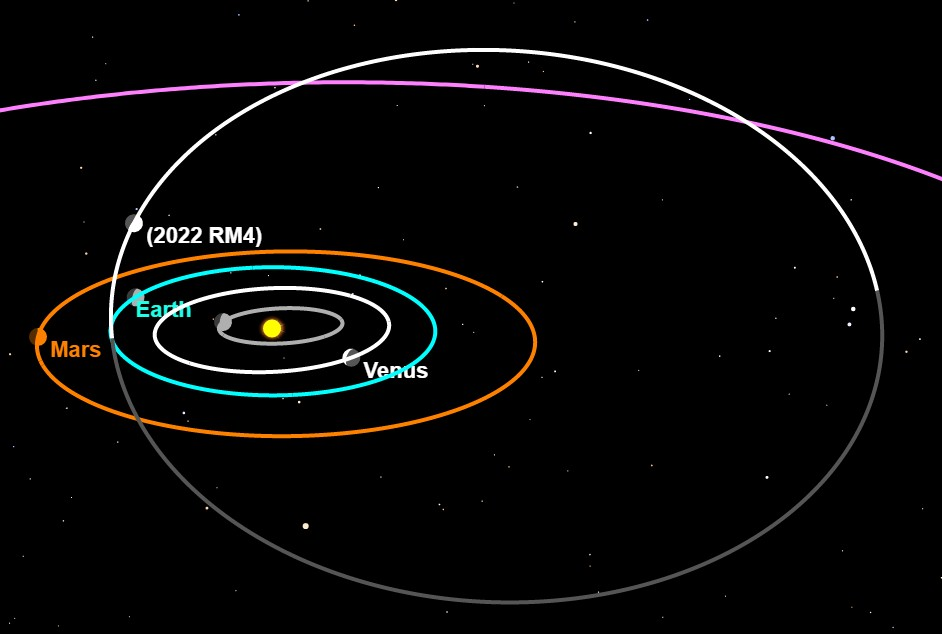
- The orbit of 2022 RM_{4} is highly inclined at 38° and takes 3.8 years to orbit the Sun.

Discovery
- Discovered by: Pan-STARRS 2
- Discovery date: 12 September 2022

Designations
- Minor planet category: Apollo; NEO; PHA

Orbital characteristics
- Epoch 2022-Aug-09 (JD 2459800.5)
- Uncertainty parameter 5
- Observation arc: 50 days
- Aphelion: 3.90 AU (Q)
- Perihelion: 0.98844 AU (q)
- Semi-major axis: 2.446 AU (a)
- Eccentricity: 0.596 (e)
- Orbital period (sidereal): 3.83 years
- Mean anomaly: 337.8° (M)
- Inclination: 38.31° (i)
- Longitude of ascending node: 218.2° (Ω)
- Time of perihelion: 3 November 2022
- Argument of perihelion: 181.7° (ω)
- Earth MOID: 0.0032 AU (480 thousand km; 1.2 LD)
- Jupiter MOID: 1.5 AU (220 million km)

Physical characteristics
- Dimensions: ≈400 m (1,000 ft) (Note: An absolute magnitude of 19.8 and assumed albedo of 0.14 gives a diameter of 389 meters (or ≈400 meters after rounding).); 290–650 meters (Note: Diameter range based on Minor Planet Center absolute magnitude value of 19.8 and assumed albedo range of 0.25 to 0.05.)
- Absolute magnitude (H): 19.8

2022 RM_{4} is categorized as a potentially hazardous asteroid because it is around 400 meters in diameter and makes close approaches to Earth. It was discovered on 12 September 2022 when it was 0.61 AU (91 million km) from Earth and located at declination +65 near the northern circumpolar star Zeta Draconis.

At 1 November 2022 18:26 UT it passed 0.01536 AU (2,298,000 km; 5.98 LD) from Earth. As of 1 November 2022 the uncertainty in the close approach distance was ±77 km. The asteroid should have brighten to about apparent magnitude 14.3 which is roughly the brightness of Pluto and was around 75 degrees from the Sun. It may have been viewable by experienced amateur observers with a telescope that has an aperture of around 8-inches or better.

Earth Approach on 1 November 2022
Date	JPL Horizons nominal geocentric distance (AU)	uncertainty region (3-sigma)
2022-11-01 18:26 ± 00:01	0.01536 AU (2.298 million km)	±77 km

By 2 November 2022 the asteroid was better placed for the southern hemisphere with a declination of –32. Goldstone Solar System Radar using the Canberra Deep Space Communication Complex 70–meter Deep Space Station 43 and Australia Telescope Compact Array observed the asteroid on 2 November 2022. It then came to perihelion (closest approach to the Sun) on 3 November 2022.

== See also ==
- List of asteroid close approaches to Earth in 2022 beyond 1 LD
- List of asteroid close approaches to Earth in 2023 beyond 1 LD
- 2015 TB145
