= (741081) 2005 LW3 =

Binary near-Earth asteroid

(741081) 2005 LW_{3}
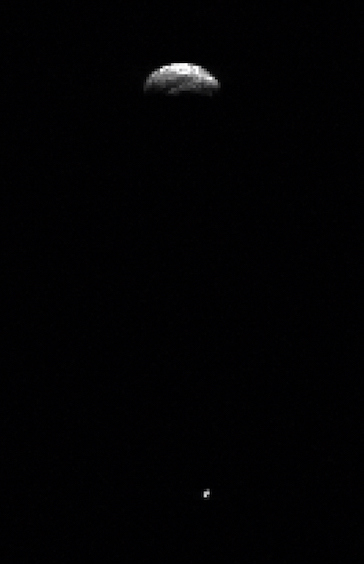
- Radar image of 2005 LW_{3} and its satellite (below) by the Goldstone Solar System Radar on 23 November 2022

Discovery
- Discovered by: Siding Spring Survey
- Discovery site: Siding Spring Obs.
- Discovery date: 5 June 2005

Designations
- Minor planet category: NEO · Apollo · PHA

Orbital characteristics
- Epoch 25 February 2023 (JD 2460000.5)
- Uncertainty parameter 0
- Observation arc: 17.49 yr (6,389 days)
- Aphelion: 2.106 AU
- Perihelion: 0.771 AU
- Semi-major axis: 1.439 AU
- Eccentricity: 0.4638
- Orbital period (sidereal): 1.73 yr (630.3 days)
- Mean anomaly: 81.385°
- Mean motion: 0° 34^{m} 16.171^{s} / day
- Inclination: 6.021°
- Longitude of ascending node: 59.587°
- Time of perihelion: 5 October 2022
- Argument of perihelion: 288.663°
- Earth MOID: 0.001397 AU (209,000 km; 0.544 LD)
- Jupiter MOID: 3.335 AU

Physical characteristics
- Mean diameter: 400 m (primary)
- Synodic rotation period: 3.6 h
- Geometric albedo: 0.02
- Absolute magnitude (H): 21.89 · 21.68

(741081) 2005 LW_{3} is a binary near-Earth asteroid classified as a potentially hazardous object of the Apollo group. It was discovered on 5 June 2005 by the Siding Spring Survey at Siding Spring Observatory in Australia. It made a close approach of 2.97 lunar distances (1.14×10^{6} km; 0.71×10^{6} mi) from Earth on 23 November 2022, reaching a peak brightness of apparent magnitude 13 as it passed over the northern celestial hemisphere sky. It was extensively observed by astronomers worldwide during the close approach, and radar observations by NASA's Goldstone Solar System Radar in California discovered a 100 m (330 ft)-wide natural satellite orbiting the asteroid at a wide separation of 4 km (2.5 mi).

== Physical characteristics ==
Goldstone Solar System Radar observations in November 2022 resolved the shape of 2005 LW_{3}, revealing a body 400 m (1,300 ft) in diameter—larger than its previously expected diameter of 150 m (490 ft). For an absolute magnitude of 21.9, this radar-measured diameter indicates that 2005 LW_{3} has a very low geometric albedo of 0.02. These radar observations also determined a rotation period of 3.6 hours for 2005 LW_{3}.

== Satellite ==
The satellite of 2005 LW_{3} was discovered by a team of astronomers (Note: Observers credited for the discovery of the satellite include: S. P. Naidu, L. A. M. Benner, M. Brozovic, J. D. Giorgini, S. Horiuchi, I. Savill-Brown, J. Stevens, C. Phillips, P. Edwards, and E. Kruzins.) using Goldstone Solar System Radar observations from 23–27 November 2022. The satellite appears elongated, with equatorial dimensions of 100 m × 50 m (330 ft × 160 ft). The satellite is widely separated from 2005 LW_{3} (the primary body of the system) at a semi-major axis of about 4 km (2.5 mi), which is around 17% of the primary's Hill radius (24 km or 15 mi for an assumed primary density of 1.6 g/cm^{3}). The satellite's discovery was announced in a Central Bureau Electronic Telegram on 10 December 2022.
