= 405 Thia =

Main-belt asteroid

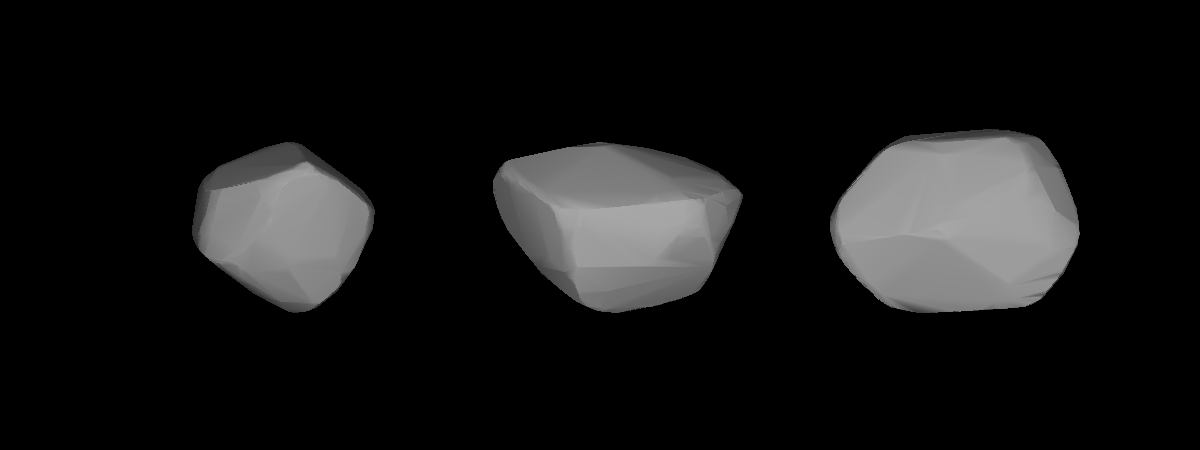
- Lightcurve-base 3D-model of 405 Thia.

Discovery
- Discovered by: Auguste Charlois
- Discovery date: 23 July 1895

Designations
- Pronunciation: /ˈθaɪə/
- Named after: Theia
- Alternative designations: 1895 BZ
- Minor planet category: Main belt

Orbital characteristics
- Epoch 2023-Feb-25 (JD 2460000.5)
- Uncertainty parameter 0
- Observation arc: 123.54 years
- Aphelion: 3.2145 AU (480.88 Gm)
- Perihelion: 1.9592 AU (293.09 Gm)
- Semi-major axis: 2.5861 AU (386.88 Gm)
- Eccentricity: 0.24341
- Orbital period (sidereal): 4.16 yr (1518.3 d)
- Mean anomaly: 336.81°
- Mean motion: 0° 14^{m} 13.164^{s} / day
- Inclination: 11.937°
- Longitude of ascending node: 255.19°
- Time of perihelion: 2 June 2023
- Argument of perihelion: 308.65°
- Earth MOID: 0.975 AU (145.9 million km; 379 LD)

Physical characteristics
- Mean diameter: 119.36±7.70 km (composite estimate); 108.894±0.312 km
- Mass: (1.68 ± 0.679) × 10^{18} kg (composite estimate) (1.63±0.43)×10^{18} kg (Note: Calculated from its standard gravitational parameter GM = 0.109±0.029 km^{3}/s^{2}.)
- Mean density: 1.89 ± 0.85 g/cm^{3} 2.41 g/cm^{3} (Note: Assuming a diameter of 109 km.)
- Synodic rotation period: 10.08 h (0.420 d)
- Geometric albedo: 0.0468±0.002
- Spectral type: C
- Absolute magnitude (H): 8.65

405 Thia is a very large main-belt asteroid. It is classified as a C-type asteroid and is probably composed of carbonaceous material. This object was discovered by Auguste Charlois on July 23, 1895, in Nice, and was named after Theia (sometimes written Thea or Thia), a Titaness in Greek mythology.

In 2002, the asteroid was detected by radar from the Arecibo Observatory at a distance of 1.31 AU. The resulting data yielded an effective diameter of 125 ± 16 km. NEOWISE data suggests the asteroid is 110 km in diameter.

On 4 May 1990 Thia passed 0.969 AU (145.0 million km; 377 LD) from Earth and will pass that close again on 29 April 2073.

405 Thia currently has a Minimum orbit intersection distance with Earth of 0.976 AU (146.0 million km; 380 LD). On 2 June 2023 the asteroid reached perihelion (closest approach to the Sun).

Thia Earth approach on 2023-Mar-20
Date & time of closest approach	Earth distance (AU)	Sun distance (AU)	Velocity wrt Earth (km/s)	Velocity wrt Sun (km/s)	Uncertainty region (3-sigma)	Reference
2023-03-20 19:40	1.057 AU (158.1 million km; 411 LD)	2.006 AU (300.1 million km; 781 LD)	6.8	23.3	± 16 km	Horizons
