= 2023 DZ2 =

Small near-Earth asteroid

2023 DZ_{2}
- Goldstone radar images of asteroid 2023 DZ_{2} taken 25 March 2023.

Discovery
- Discovered by: EURONEAR
- Discovery site: Roque de los Muchachos Observatory
- Discovery date: 27 February 2023

Designations
- Minor planet category: NEO; Apollo

Orbital characteristics
- Epoch 25 February 2023 (JD 2460000.5)
- Uncertainty parameter 1
- Observation arc: 72 days (includes highly precise radar observations)
- Earliest precovery date: 14 January 2023
- Aphelion: 3.317±0.0002 AU
- Perihelion: 0.99388 AU
- Semi-major axis: 2.155±0.0001 AU
- Eccentricity: 0.5389±0.00003
- Orbital period (sidereal): 3.165±0.0003 yr (1,156±0.1 days)
- Mean anomaly: 348.67°±0.001°
- Mean motion: 0° 18^{m} 38.16^{s} / day
- Inclination: 0.08143°
- Longitude of ascending node: 187.91°±0.0005°
- Time of perihelion: 2023-Apr-04
- Argument of perihelion: 5.96°±0.0005°
- Earth MOID: 0.000048 AU (7.2 thousand km; 0.019 LD)

Physical characteristics
- Dimensions: 40–90 meters (CNEOS); ≈54 m (180 ft)
- Synodic rotation period: 0.105 hours (6.3 min)
- Apparent magnitude: 10.1 (at closest approach 2023)
- Absolute magnitude (H): 24.2±0.4 mag

2023 DZ_{2} is an asteroid roughly 70 meters in diameter, classified as a near-Earth object of the Apollo group, and originally a Virtual Impactor (VI). It was first observed on 27 February 2023, when it was 0.11 AU (16 million km) from Earth, with the Isaac Newton Telescope by Ovidiu Vaduvescu, Freya Barwell, and Kiran Jhass (ING and University of Sheffield student support astronomers) within the EURONEAR project. It passed 174,644 ± 0.9 km (108,518.75 ± 0.56 mi) of Earth on March 25, 2023. This is a little less than half the distance to the Moon. This was the largest asteroid to approach this close since 2019 OK. On March 21, 2023 with a 66-day observation arc, it was removed from the Sentry Risk Table. Due to the highly precise radar observations on 25 March 2023 we know that the 2004 Earth approach was closer than the 2023 approach.

2023 DZ_{2} Earth approaches for 2004, 2023, 2026
Date & time	Nominal distance	uncertainty region (3-sigma)
2004-Apr-18 23:57 ± 22 minutes	129737 km	± 3000 km
2023-Mar-25 19:49 (Note: If 2023 DZ2 had been arriving approximately 19 hours later it would have impacted into Earth as that is where the two orbits intersect.)	174644 km	± 0.9 km
2026-Apr-04 02:01 ± 2 minutes	1012259 km	± 120 km

The 2023 approach was visible to amateur astronomers with modest telescopes and telescopes equipped with an image sensor. From 20–24 March 2023 it was visible in the constellation of Cancer. At about 17:20 UT on the 25th the asteroid brightened to about apparent magnitude 10.1 (Note: The asteroid is brightest ~2 hours before closest approach due to the opposition effect that causes a brightening of the object.) while over Southeast Asia, and might have been visible to advanced observers using 10×50 binoculars. (Note: Inexperienced observers could easily get confused by an artificial satellite that will look like a star steadily moving across the sky for a few minutes.) But for many locations the asteroid did not get brighter than magnitude 12 before setting and was out of the reach of binoculars.

== Identification ==
The discovery was carried out within the (Data-parallel detection of Solar System objects and space debris) ParaSOL project that is sponsored by UEFISCDI in Romania and led by Marcel Popescu. The new NEA was identified by Costin Boldea and by the STU ParaSOL software pipeline developed by the amateur astronomer Malin Stanescu. Other members of the EURONEAR collaboration who participated in the data analysis were Marian Predatu, and the amateur astronomers Lucian Curelaru and Daniel Bertesteanu.

== Description ==
2023 DZ_{2} is approximately 40–90 meters (130–300 feet) in diameter. With an estimated rotation period of about 6 minutes and a lightcurve amplitude of 0.57 magnitudes, the object is suspected of being elongated in shape.

The visible reflectance spectrum of 2023 DZ_{2} is consistent with that of an X-type asteroid. Being a fast rotator and part of the X-complex, it is highly unlikely to have a carbonaceous-like composition linked to a dark albedo so the size could be in the range 33 to 55 m.

Before the Earth approach, it follows a rather eccentric (0.54), low-inclination (0.08°) orbit of 3.16 years duration, ranging between 0.99 and 3.32 AU from the Sun. It passed Earth on 25 March 2023 which reduces the orbital period to 1,098.4 days (3.007 yr). It came to perihelion (closest approach to the Sun) on 4 April 2023. Earth is in no short-term danger of having a collision with 2023 DZ_{2} thanks to a near secular apsidal resonance with Jupiter.

== Ruled-out virtual impactors ==
On 18 March 2023 when the asteroid had an observation arc of 63 days, virtual clones of the asteroid that fit the uncertainty region in the known trajectory showed a 1-in-430 chance that the asteroid could impact Earth on 27 March 2026. Three days later with a 66-day observation arc it was removed from the Sentry Risk Table. It is now known that the nominal approach (line of variation) has the asteroid 0.032 AU (4.8 million km) ± 900 km from Earth at the time of the potential impact on 27 March 2026. The asteroid will safely approach Earth on 4 April 2026, a week after the potential impact scenario. It was estimated that an impact would produce an upper atmosphere air burst equivalent to 4.5 Mt TNT (19 PJ), roughly equal to 214 of the Fat Man warhead dropped on Nagasaki, or a little over a third of the Tunguska event.

External videos
- 2023 DZ2 flyby through a remote telescope of Abbey Ridge Observatory (Canada).
- 2023 DZ2 flyby through a Unistellar 112mm telescope under the light pollution of Sacramento, CA.

2023 DZ_{2} nominal approach for 27 March 2026 14:53 virtual impactor
Solution	Observation arc (in days)	JPL Horizons nominal geocentric distance (AU)	uncertainty region (3-sigma)	Impact probability	Torino scale	Palermo scale (max)
JPL #1 (2023-Mar-16)	2 (31 obs)	0.625 AU (93.5 million km)	± 700 million km	1:7700	0	–2.19
JPL #3 (2023-Mar-17)	18 (56 obs)	0.067 AU (10.0 million km)	± 38 million km	1:590	1	–1.19
JPL #4 (2023-Mar-18)	63 (94 obs)	0.036 AU (5.4 million km)	± 9 million km	1:430	1	–1.17
JPL #5 (2023-Mar-19)	64 (122 obs)	0.033 AU (4.9 million km)	± 4 million km	1:71000 (Note: With a 64-day observation arc the risk of impact dropped significantly as the 3-sigma uncertainty region became smaller than the nominal approach distance. A virtual impactor is the result of a line of variations (ellipse) that is narrow and long and stretches along the asteroids known orbit. The Earth distance at the time of the virtual impactor dropped from 5 ± 9 million km to 5 ± 4 million km.)	0	–3.40
JPL #6 (2023-Mar-20)	65 (142 obs)	0.033 AU (4.9 million km)	± 3 million km	1:38000000	0	–6.14
JPL #7 (2023-Mar-21)	66 (182 obs)	0.030 AU (4.5 million km)	± 1 million km	none	N/A	N/A
JPL #8 (2023-Mar-22)	67 (246 obs)	0.030 AU (4.5 million km)	± 1 million km	none	N/A	N/A

With an observation arc of 63 days it peaked at a Palermo scale rating of –1.17 with the odds of impact then being about 15 times less than the background hazard level.

The early May 2029 approach is not an impact threat as the orbits only intersect in late March.

== Gallery ==
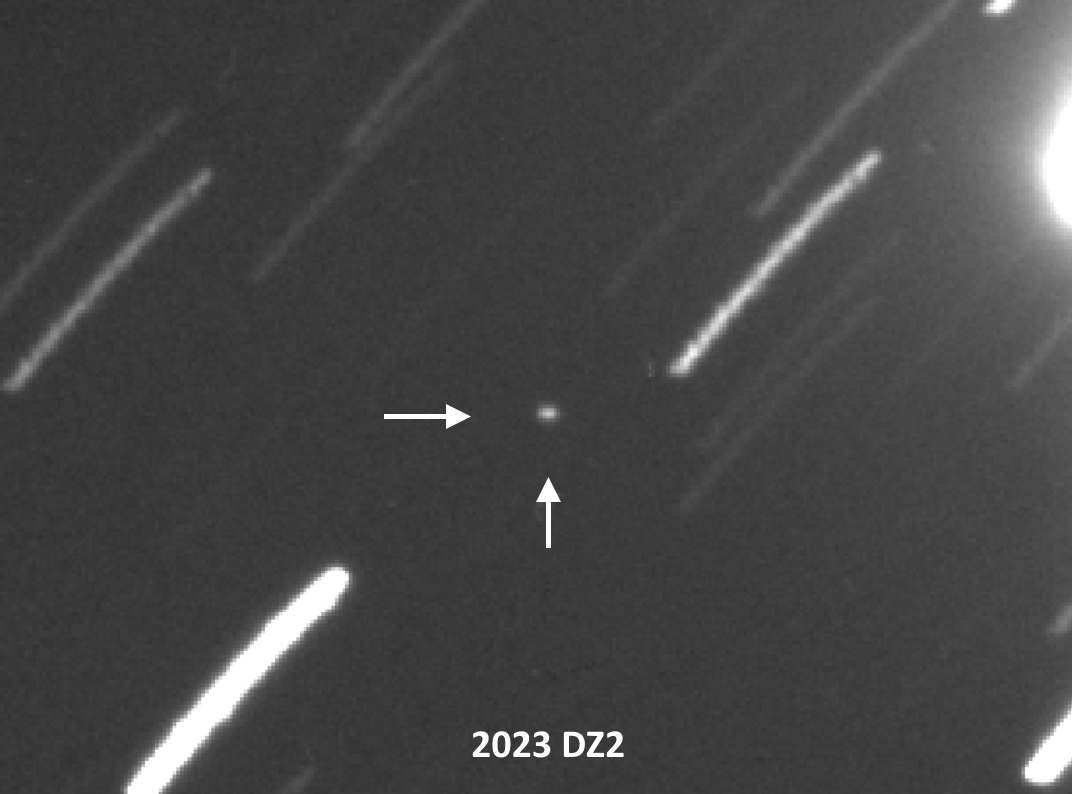
Stacked image of 2023 DZ_{2} from 52 60-second photos taken remotely on March 21, 2023, at Abbey Ridge Observatory (Canada).

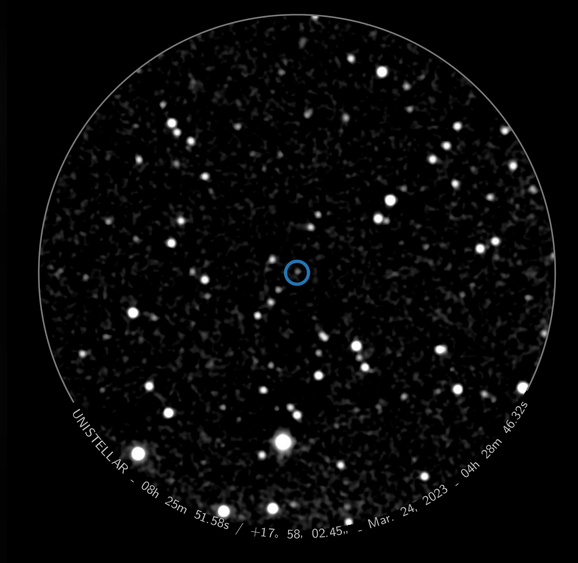
2023 DZ_{2} imaged with a Unistellar 112mm telescope under the light pollution of Sacramento, CA on 24 March 2023.
