= 2022 QX4 =

Near-Earth asteroid 2022

2022 QX_{4}
Discovery
- Discovered by: ATLAS (W68)
- Discovery date: 24 August 2022

Designations
- Minor planet category: Aten; NEO; risk listed

Orbital characteristics
- Epoch 2022-Aug-09 (JD 2459800.5)
- Uncertainty parameter 2
- Observation arc: 9 years
- Earliest precovery date: 16 August 2013
- Aphelion: 1.025 AU (Q)
- Perihelion: 0.33713 AU (q)
- Semi-major axis: 0.6809 AU (a)
- Eccentricity: 0.50481 (e)
- Orbital period (sidereal): 0.562 years
- Mean anomaly: 154.3° (M)
- Inclination: 0.14800° (i)
- Longitude of ascending node: 335.6° (Ω)
- Time of perihelion: 13 May 2022
- Argument of perihelion: 176.2° (ω)
- Earth MOID: 0.00027 AU (40 thousand km; 0.11 LD)
- Jupiter MOID: 3.97 AU (594 million km)

Physical characteristics
- Dimensions: ~40 m (100 ft); 30–70 meters
- Absolute magnitude (H): 24.7

2022 QX_{4} is a Tunguska event-sized asteroid, classified as a near-Earth object of the Aten group, approximately 40 meters (130 feet) in diameter. It was discovered by ATLAS on 24 August 2022, when it was 0.03 AU (4.5 million km) from Earth. On 4 September 2022 with an observation arc of 8 days, it was listed with a 1-in-109 chance of impacting Earth with a Torino scale of 1 for a virtual impactor on 4 September 2068 00:52 UTC. Five precovery images from August 2013 were published on 11 September 2022 extending the observation arc to 9 years and 2022 QX_{4} was removed from the Sentry Risk Table. The nominal approach is expected to occur 26 August 2068.

Closest approach to Earth in 2022 occurred on 29 August 2022 at a distance of about 1.8 million km. The asteroid passed about 130,000 km (0.34 LD) from Earth on 5 September 1977.
