= (745311) 2010 XC15 =

Near-Earth asteroid

(745311) 2010 XC_{15}
- An animation of 2010 XC_{15}'s radar echo, as observed by the Goldstone Observatory.

Discovery
- Discovered by: Catalina Sky Survey (703); 0.68-m Schmidt
- Discovery date: 2010-12-05

Designations
- Minor planet category: Aten; NEO; PHA

Orbital characteristics
- Epoch 2020-Dec-17 (JD 2459200.5)
- Uncertainty parameter 1
- Observation arc: 10.1 years
- Aphelion: 1.0412 AU (155.76 Gm) (Q)
- Perihelion: 0.42875 AU (64.140 Gm) (q)
- Semi-major axis: 0.73497 AU (109.950 Gm) (a)
- Eccentricity: 0.41665 (e)
- Orbital period (sidereal): 0.63 yr (230.15 d)
- Mean anomaly: 151.705° (M)
- Mean motion: 1.5638°/day (n)
- Inclination: 8.3848° (i)
- Longitude of ascending node: 94.474° (Ω)
- Argument of perihelion: 157.66° (ω)
- Earth MOID: 0.002356 AU (352,500 km)
- Jupiter MOID: 3.9932 AU (597.37 Gm)

Physical characteristics
- Dimensions: ~200 metres (660 ft)
- Absolute magnitude (H): 21.4

(745311) 2010 XC_{15} is an Aten near-Earth asteroid and potentially hazardous object that spends most of its time inside of the orbit of Earth. It has an observation arc of 10 years and an Uncertainty Parameter of 1. It was discovered on 5 December 2010 by the Catalina Sky Survey at an apparent magnitude of 17.5 using a 0.68-metre (27 in) Schmidt.

Based on an absolute magnitude of 21.4, the asteroid has an estimated diameter of about 200 metres (660 ft). 2010 XC_{15} is noted for a close approach to Earth on 27 December 1976 at a distance of about 0.00625 AU (935,000 km; 581,000 mi). In November 2011 with an observation arc of 40 days, the JPL Small-Body Database showed that the uncertainty region of the asteroid during the 1976 close approach could result in a pass anywhere from 0.001 AU to 0.018 AU from Earth. During the 1976 close approach the asteroid reached about an apparent magnitude of 14.

The asteroid passed 0.00516 AU (772,000 km; 480,000 mi) from Earth on 27 December 2022, allowing a refinement to the known trajectory. The uncertainty region in 2013 suggested that the asteroid could have passed inside the orbit of the Moon in 1907, but is now known to have passed about 0.01 AU (1,500,000 km; 930,000 mi) from Earth in 1907.

2010 XC_{15} Position uncertainty and increasing divergence
Date	JPL SBDB nominal geocentric distance (AU)	uncertainty region (3-sigma)
1907-12-26	0.011466 AU (1.7153 million km)	±640 thousand km
1914-12-27	0.005121 AU (766.1 thousand km)	±21 thousand km
1976-12-27	0.006253 AU (935.4 thousand km)	±260 km
2022-12-27	0.005160 AU (771.9 thousand km)	±320 km
2064-12-26	0.008920 AU (1.3344 million km)	±80 thousand km
2096-12-27	0.004309 AU (644.6 thousand km)	±660 thousand km

The asteroid 2002 JE9, with a much larger observation arc, is known to have passed 0.0015 AU (220,000 km; 140,000 mi) from Earth on 11 April 1971.
