= (85713) 1998 SS49 =

Asteroid

(85713) 1998 SS_{49}
Discovery
- Discovered by: LINEAR
- Discovery site: Lincoln Lab's ETS
- Discovery date: 29 September 1998

Designations
- Minor planet category: Apollo · NEO · PHA

Orbital characteristics
- Epoch 4 September 2017 (JD 2458000.5)
- Uncertainty parameter 0
- Observation arc: 18.05 yr (6,593 days)
- Aphelion: 3.1535 AU
- Perihelion: 0.6940 AU
- Semi-major axis: 1.9237 AU
- Eccentricity: 0.6393
- Orbital period (sidereal): 2.67 yr (975 days)
- Mean anomaly: 359.74°
- Mean motion: 0° 22^{m} 9.84^{s} / day
- Inclination: 10.764°
- Longitude of ascending node: 41.493°
- Argument of perihelion: 102.47°
- Earth MOID: 0.0023 AU · 0.9 LD

Physical characteristics
- Dimensions: 2.00±0.06 km 2.25 km (calculated); 3.03±1.49 km 3.484±0.789 km
- Synodic rotation period: 5.370±0.005 h (Note: Lightcurve plot of (85713) 1998 SS_{49} – ambiguous rotation period 5.370±0.005 and 2.686±0.002 hours, by B. D. Warner at the CS3–Palmer Divide Station (2014). Quality code of 2. Summary figures at the LCDB and CS3 website.); 5.398±0.001 h 5.66±0.01 h (Note: Lightcurve plot of (85713) 1998 SS_{49} – rotation period 5.66±0.01 hours, by B. D. Warner at the CS3–Palmer Divide Station (2014). Quality code of 2. Summary figures at the LCDB and CS3 website.)
- Geometric albedo: 0.076±0.039; 0.08±0.12; 0.20 (assumed); 0.237±0.018
- Spectral type: S (assumed)
- Absolute magnitude (H): 15.6 · 15.70 · 15.80±0.29 · 16.01

(85713) 1998 SS_{49} is an asteroid on an eccentric orbit, classified as a near-Earth object and potentially hazardous asteroid of the Apollo group, approximately 3 kilometers (1.9 miles) in diameter. The asteroid was discovered on 29 September 1998, by astronomers of the LINEAR program at Lincoln Laboratory's Experimental Test Site near Socorro, New Mexico, in the United States. It is one of the largest potentially hazardous asteroids and has a notably low Earth-MOID of less than the distance to the Moon.

== Orbit and classification ==
1998 SS_{49} is a member of the dynamical Apollo group, which are Earth-crossing asteroids. Apollo asteroids are the largest subgroup of near-Earth objects.

It orbits the Sun at a distance of 0.7–3.2 AU once every 2 years and 8 months (975 days; semi-major axis of 1.92 AU). Its orbit has a high eccentricity of 0.64 and an inclination of 11° with respect to the ecliptic. The body's observation arc begins with its official discovery observation at Socorro in September 1998.

=== Close approaches ===
At about absolute magnitude 15.6, 1998 SS_{49} is one of the brightest and presumably largest known potentially hazardous asteroid (see PHA-list). It has a very low Earth minimum orbital intersection distance of 0.0023 AU (340 thousand km; 0.90 LD). On 26 November 1902, this asteroid made its closest near-Earth encounter since 1900 at a nominal distance of 0.0659 AU (9.86 million km; 25.6 LD). The next notable close approach was on 21 November 2022, passing at a nominal distance of 0.141 AU (21,100,000 km; 13,100,000 mi).

1998 SS_{49} is also a Venus- and Mars-crosser, as it crosses the orbit of Venus and the Red Planet at c. 0.72 and 1.66 AU, respectively.

== Physical characteristics ==
1998 SS_{49} is an assumed, stony S-type asteroid.

=== Rotation period ===
In 2014, two rotational lightcurves of 1998 SS_{49} were obtained from photometric observations by American astronomer Brian Warner at the CS3–Palmer Divide Station in California (U82). Lightcurve analysis gave a rotation period of 5.370 and 5.66 hours and a brightness variation of 0.18 and 0.06 magnitude, respectively (U=2/2), one of which gave an alternative period solution of 2.686±0.002 hours. In April 2016, the EURONEAR lightcurve survey measured a period of 5.398 hours with an amplitude of 0.12 magnitude (U=2).

=== Diameter and albedo ===
Surveys contrast: of the Japanese Akari satellite and the NEOWISE mission of NASA's Wide-field Infrared Survey Explorer. These measure the object as between 2 and 3.484 kilometers lengthways (in diameter) and to have an albedo (optical wavelength reflectivity) between 0.076 and 0.237. The Collaborative Asteroid Lightcurve Link assumes a stony typical albedo of 0.20 to calculate the diameter as 2.25 kilometers and an absolute magnitude of 15.6.

== Numbering and naming ==
This minor planet was numbered by the Minor Planet Center on 30 August 2004. As of 2018, it has not been named.
