= 2022 YO1 =

Risk–listed near-Earth asteroid

2022 YO_{1}
Discovery
- Discovered by: Catalina Sky Survey
- Discovery date: 17 December 2022

Designations
- Minor planet category: NEO; Apollo; risk listed

Orbital characteristics
- Epoch 2025-Nov-21 (JD 2461000.5)
- Uncertainty parameter 6
- Observation arc: 0.4 days
- Aphelion: 2.40 AU (Q)
- Perihelion: 0.8027 AU (q)
- Semi-major axis: 1.600 AU (a)
- Eccentricity: 0.4984 (e)
- Orbital period (sidereal): 2.024 years
- Mean anomaly: 143.50° (M)
- Inclination: 13.56° (i)
- Longitude of ascending node: 85.48° (Ω)
- Time of perihelion: 2023-Jan-30
- Argument of perihelion: 63.48° (ω)
- Earth MOID: 0.00017 AU (25,000 km)
- Jupiter MOID: 2.7 AU (400,000,000 km)

Physical characteristics
- Dimensions: ~3 m (10 ft); 3–6 meters (CNEOS)
- Absolute magnitude (H): 30

2022 YO_{1} is a small and harmless near-Earth object that will pass within 0.014 AU (2.1 million km) of Earth around 17 December 2024. At 17 December 2024 06:14 UT it has a 0.23% (1-in-430) chance of impacting Earth. It is estimated to be 3-meters in diameter which would make an impact comparable to 2008 TC3. It has a very short observation arc of 0.4 days. It was first imaged on 17 December 2022 07:07, when it was 0.004 AU (600 thousand km) from Earth, and made its closest approach to Earth at a distance of 0.00018 AU (27,000 km) shortly after on the same day.

At the time of the virtual impactor (17 December 2024 06:14) the asteroid is expected to be 0.0055 AU (820 thousand km) from Earth but has an uncertainty region of ±1.5 million km (0.01 AU). The nominal approach to Earth is expected to occur about nine hours later at 17 December 2024 15:41 at a distance of 0.005 AU (750 thousand km).

2024-Dec-17 06:14 Virtual Impactor
Date	Impact probability	JPL Horizons nominal geocentric distance (AU)	NEODyS nominal geocentric distance (AU)	MPC nominal geocentric distance (AU)	uncertainty region (3-sigma)
2024-12-17 06:14	0.23%	0.0055 AU (820 thousand km)	0.0051 AU (760 thousand km)	0.0056 AU (840 thousand km)	± 1.5 million km

Line of variation (LOV) and different closest approaches
Date and time	Nominal closest approach	Reference
17 December 2024 06:14	Impact scenario	Sentry
17 December 2024 14:15	0.0043 AU (640 thousand km)	ESA
17 December 2024 15:41	0.0051 AU (760 thousand km)	JPL SBDB

It reached perihelion (closest approach to the Sun) on 30 January 2023.
