= 2022 UR4 =

Small near-Earth asteroid

2022 UR_{4}
Discovery
- Discovered by: ATLAS-MLO
- Discovery site: Mauna Loa Obs.
- Discovery date: 20 November 2022

Designations
- Alternative designations: A10OBKV
- Minor planet category: NEO · Apollo

Orbital characteristics
- Epoch 25 February 2023 (JD 2460000.5)
- Uncertainty parameter 6
- Observation arc: 13.56 hours
- Aphelion: 2.701 AU
- Perihelion: 0.831 AU
- Semi-major axis: 1.766 AU
- Eccentricity: 0.5294
- Orbital period (sidereal): 2.35 yr (857.0 days)
- Mean anomaly: 36.030°
- Mean motion: 0° 25^{m} 12.279^{s} / day
- Inclination: 11.292°
- Longitude of ascending node: 207.182°
- Time of perihelion: December 2022
- Argument of perihelion: 238.577°
- Earth MOID: 0.000407 AU (60,900 km; 0.158 LD)
- Jupiter MOID: 2.641 AU

Physical characteristics
- Mean diameter: 4.4–9.9 m (assumed albedo 0.05–0.25)
- Absolute magnitude (H): 28.90±0.45

2022 UR_{4} is a small near-Earth asteroid that made an extremely close approach within 0.044 lunar distances (17,000 km; 11,000 mi) from Earth's center on 20 October 2022 at 22:45 UTC. It was discovered about 14 hours before closest approach by the Asteroid Terrestrial-impact Last Alert System (ATLAS) survey telescope at Mauna Loa Observatory, Hawaii on 20 November 2022. During the close approach, the asteroid passed above the northern hemisphere of Earth and reached a peak brightness of magnitude 10, just 40 times fainter than the threshold of naked eye visibility. (Note: The faintest magnitude that can be seen with the naked eye is about 6. Using the formula Δm = −2.5 log_{10}(F_{1}/F_{2}), where Δm = m_{1} – m_{2} = 6 – 10 = –4 is the magnitude difference between the naked eye limit and 2022 UR_{4}'s peak brightness, the brightness ratio F_{1}/F_{2} of the naked eye limit to the peak brightness of 2022 UR_{4} is approximately 39.81 ≈ F_{1}/F_{2} = 10^{(Δm/–2.5)}.)
