= 2023 NT1 =

Near-Earth asteroid

2023 NT_{1}
Discovery
- Discovered by: ATLAS South Africa
- Discovery date: 15 July 2023

Designations
- Minor planet category: NEO · Apollo

Orbital characteristics
- Epoch 17 October 2024 (JD 2460600.5) (Post-flyby orbit)
- Observation arc: 62 days (260 obs)
- Aphelion: 2.862 AU
- Perihelion: 0.923 AU
- Semi-major axis: 1.892 AU
- Eccentricity: 0.5124
- Orbital period (sidereal): 2.60 yr
- Mean anomaly: 187.64°
- Mean motion: 0° 22^{m} 43.313^{s} / day
- Inclination: 5.78°
- Longitude of ascending node: 290.58°
- Argument of perihelion: 316.24°
- Earth MOID: 0.00111102 AU (166,206 km; 0.43237 LD)

Physical characteristics
- Mean diameter: 30 m (98 ft)
- Absolute magnitude (H): 25.04±0.377 (JPL)

2023 NT_{1} is a near-Earth asteroid, approximately 30 meters in diameter, that passed within 1/4 lunar distances on 13 July 2023.

It was not discovered until 2 days after closest approach due to coming from the daylight direction.

The asteroid now has a 62-day observation arc, and it is known that it will pass a harmless 1.1 AU (160 million km; 430 LD) from Earth in July 2044. It was removed from the Sentry Risk Table on 16 September 2023.

In October 2023, a group of astronomers published a preprint that analysed the circumstances of this near-Earth encounter, and proposed planetary defense measures to mitigate the danger presented by similar future incidents, using hypervelocity kinetic penetrators to reduce the approaching impactor to fragments small enough to disintegrate as they entered the atmosphere.

== See also ==
- List of asteroid close approaches to Earth
