= 2022 WM7 =

Small near-Earth asteroid

2022 WM_{7}
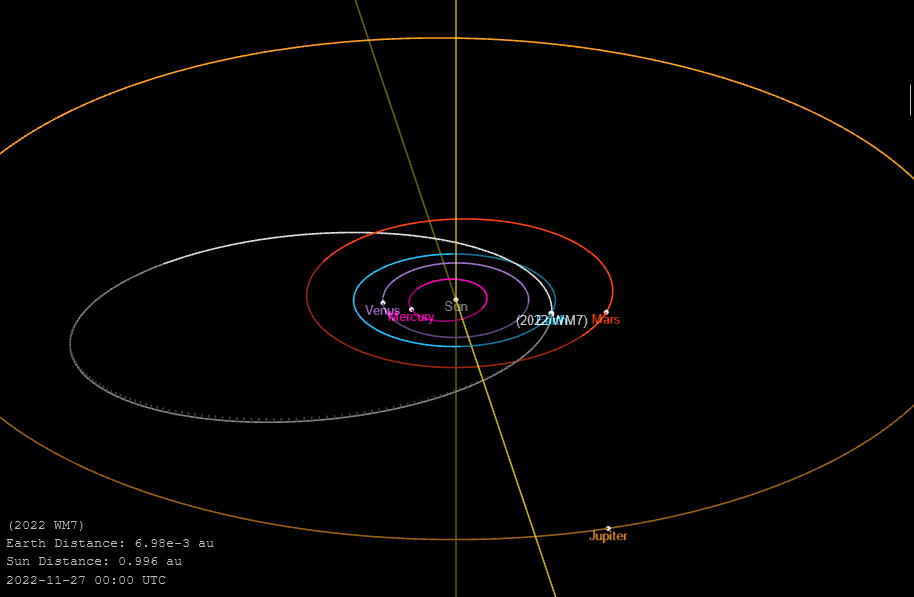
- The orbit of 2022 WM_{7} extends from Jupiter's orbit to within Earth's orbit.

Discovery
- Discovered by: Pan-STARRS 1
- Discovery site: Haleakalā Obs.
- Discovery date: 26 November 2022

Designations
- Alternative designations: P11Cgve
- Minor planet category: NEO · Apollo

Orbital characteristics
- Epoch 25 February 2023 (JD 2460000.5)
- Uncertainty parameter 6
- Observation arc: 1 day
- Aphelion: 2.817 AU
- Perihelion: 0.909 AU
- Semi-major axis: 2.454 AU
- Eccentricity: 0.6295
- Orbital period (sidereal): 2.56 yr (935.9 days)
- Mean anomaly: 310.198°
- Mean motion: 0° 15^{m} 23.027^{s} / day
- Inclination: 0.895°
- Longitude of ascending node: 66.193°
- Time of perihelion: December 2022
- Argument of perihelion: 36.419°
- Earth MOID: 0.000253 AU (37,800 km; 0.098 LD)
- Jupiter MOID: 1.197 AU

Physical characteristics
- Mean diameter: 3–6 m (assumed albedo 0.05–0.25)
- Absolute magnitude (H): 29.854±0.299

2022 WM_{7} is a small near-Earth asteroid that passed about 0.2 lunar distances (77,000 km; 48,000 mi) from Earth's center on 28 November 2022 at 02:24 UTC. It was discovered by the Pan-STARRS 1 survey telescope at Haleakalā Observatory, Hawaii on 26 November 2022.
