= 2023 DW =

Near-Earth asteroid discovered in 2023

Discovery
- Discovered by: Georges Attard and Alain Maury
- Discovery site: San Pedro de Atacama
- Discovery date: 26 February 2023

Designations
- Alternative designations: 3BP2721
- Minor planet category: NEO; Aten

Orbital characteristics
- Epoch 2025-Nov-21 (JD 2461000.5)
- Uncertainty parameter 1
- Observation arc: 1118 days
- Aphelion: 1.1450 AU (Q)
- Perihelion: 0.4952 AU (q)
- Semi-major axis: 0.8201 AU (a)
- Eccentricity: 0.3962 (e)
- Orbital period (sidereal): 0.743 years (271 days)
- Mean anomaly: 7.3° (M)
- Inclination: 5.806° (i)
- Longitude of ascending node: 326.09° (Ω)
- Time of perihelion: 2022-Nov-26
- Argument of perihelion: 40.47° (ω)
- Earth MOID: 0.00034 AU (51 thousand km)
- Venus MOID: 0.03 AU (4.5 million km)
- Jupiter MOID: 4.31 AU (645 million km)

Physical characteristics
- Mean diameter: ≈47 m (150 ft); 37–82 meters (Note: The Tunguska asteroid is estimated to have been a common stony asteroid about 50–60 meters in diameter and similar in size to 2023 DW. The Chelyabinsk meteor was only about 18 meters in diameter. Meteor Crater was created by a relatively rare (only 5% of the population) iron-nickel meteor about 50 meters in diameter.)
- Absolute magnitude (H): 24.3 (MPC)

2023 DW is a near-Earth asteroid of the Aten group. It is approximately 50 meters (160 feet) in diameter, roughly the size of the asteroid that caused the Tunguska event, and was discovered by Georges Attard and Alain Maury, from the MAP (Maury/Attard/Parrott) asteroid search program in San Pedro de Atacama on 26 February 2023, when it was 0.07 AU (10 million km) from Earth. On 28 February 2023, with an observation arc of 1.2 days, it was rated 1 on the Torino scale for a virtual impactor on 14 February 2046 at 21:36 UTC. The nominal approach is expected to occur about eight hours before the impact scenario at 14 February 2046 13:15 ± 72 minutes. Between 5–8 March, the asteroid was not observed as it was within 40 degrees of the waxing gibbous moon. On 14 March 2023 the European Space Agency was the first to drop to a Torino scale rating of 0. Sentry dropped to a Torino scale rating of 0 on 16 March 2023. It was completely removed from both risk tables on 20 March 2023.

2023 DW currently orbits the Sun once every 271 days. It came to perihelion (closest approach to the Sun) on 26 November 2022, and then approached Earth from the direction of the Sun making closest Earth approach on 18 February 2023 at distance of about 8.7 million km.

== Risk ==
With an observation arc of 13 days it peaked at a Palermo scale rating of –1.89 with the odds of impact then being about 78 times less than the background hazard level. (Note: "Background risk" is defined as the average risk posed by objects of the same size or larger over the years until the date of the potential impact. A Palermo scale rating of 0 would be equal to the background risk.) It was removed from the risk table on 20 March 2023.

2023 DW nominal approach for 14 February 2046 21:36 virtual impactor
Solution	Observation arc (in days)	JPL Horizons nominal geocentric distance (AU)	uncertainty region (3-sigma)	Impact probability	Torino scale	Palermo scale (max)
JPL #2 (2023-Feb-28)	2 (38 obs)	0.0165 AU (2.47 million km)	± 21 million km	1:830	1	–2.28
JPL #5 (2023-Mar-03)	4 (55 obs)	0.0181 AU (2.71 million km)	± 18 million km	1:710	1	–2.21
JPL #6 (2023-Mar-04)	6 (60 obs)	0.0095 AU (1.42 million km)	± 13 million km	1:543	1	–2.11
JPL #7 (2023-Mar-05)	6 (62 obs)	0.0124 AU (1.86 million km)	± 13 million km	1:613	1	–2.16
JPL #8 (2023-Mar-06)	6 (62 obs)	0.0123 AU (1.84 million km)	± 13 million km	1:560	1	–2.12
JPL #9 (2023-Mar-11)	13 (69 obs)	0.0121 AU (1.81 million km)	± 8 million km	1:420	1	–1.98
JPL #10 (2023-Mar-12)	13 (77 obs)	0.0097 AU (1.45 million km)	± 7 million km	1:360	1	–1.89
JPL #11 (2023-Mar-13)	15 (91 obs)	0.0186 AU (2.78 million km)	± 7 million km	1:670	1	–2.18
JPL #12 (2023-Mar-14)	16 (99 obs)	0.0192 AU (2.87 million km)	± 7 million km	1:770	1	–2.23
JPL #13 (2023-Mar-15)	17 (104 obs)	0.0198 AU (2.96 million km)	± 6 million km	1:1000	1	–2.34
JPL #14 (2023-Mar-16)	17 (112 obs)	0.0216 AU (3.23 million km)	± 5 million km	1:3600	0	–2.90
JPL #15 (2023-Mar-17)	18 (115 obs)	0.0214 AU (3.20 million km)	± 5 million km	1:3400	0	–2.88
JPL #16 (2023-Mar-19)	20 (118 obs)	0.0303 AU (4.53 million km)	± 4 million km	N/A (Note: The risk of impact dropped significantly as the 3-sigma uncertainty region became smaller than the nominal approach distance.)	N/A	N/A
JPL #17 (2023-Mar-20)	21 (123 obs)	0.0317 AU (4.74 million km)	± 3 million km	N/A	N/A	N/A

2023 DW Earth approach on 14 February 2046 (about 8 hours before the impact scenario)
Date & time	Nominal distance
2046-Feb-14 13:15 ± 72 minutes	4730116 km

=== Risk corridor ===
Risk corridor as it was known on 3 March 2023 with a 4-day observation arc and 55 observations. The asteroid would have most likely impacted the Pacific Ocean. At the time of the potential impactor, the asteroid is most likely to miss Earth by about 4.7 million km and has a 3-sigma uncertainty region of ± 3 million km. As the uncertainty region gets smaller the probability of impact can increase and then suddenly drop to 0.

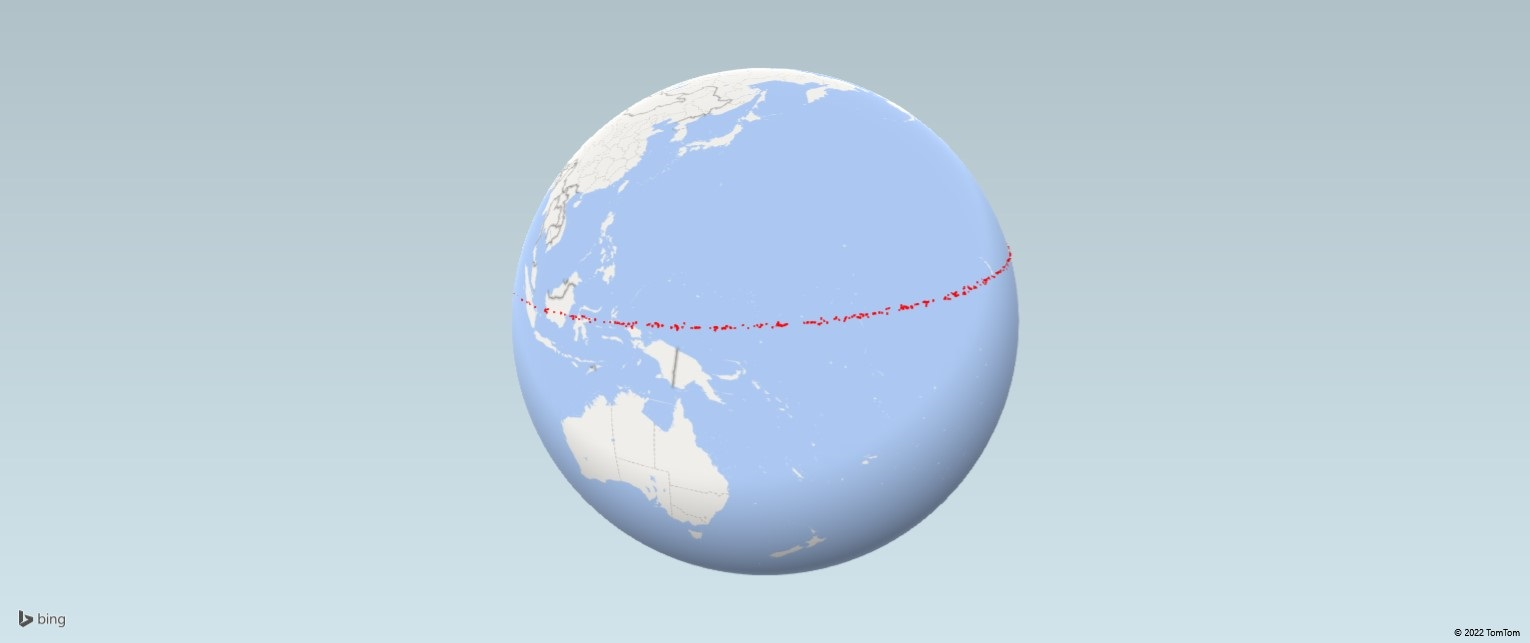
Risk corridor over Indonesia and the Pacific Ocean

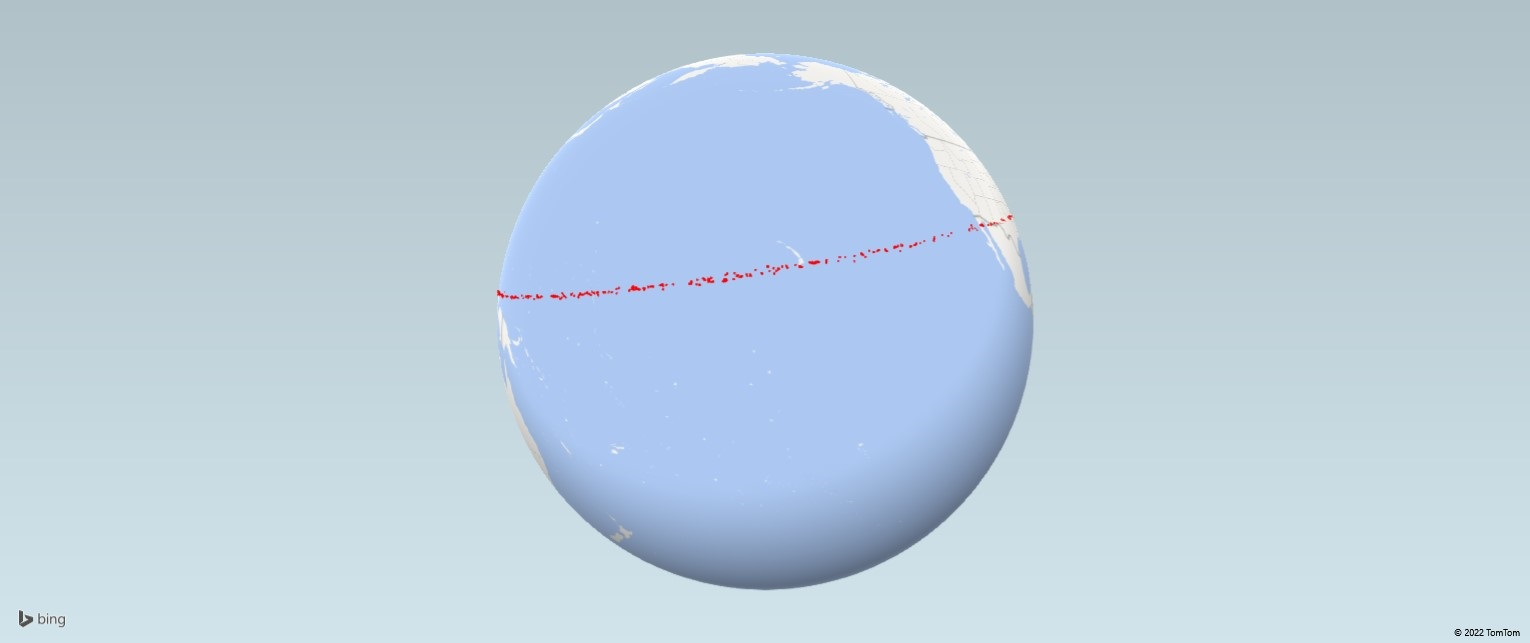
Risk corridor over the Pacific Ocean and Hawaii

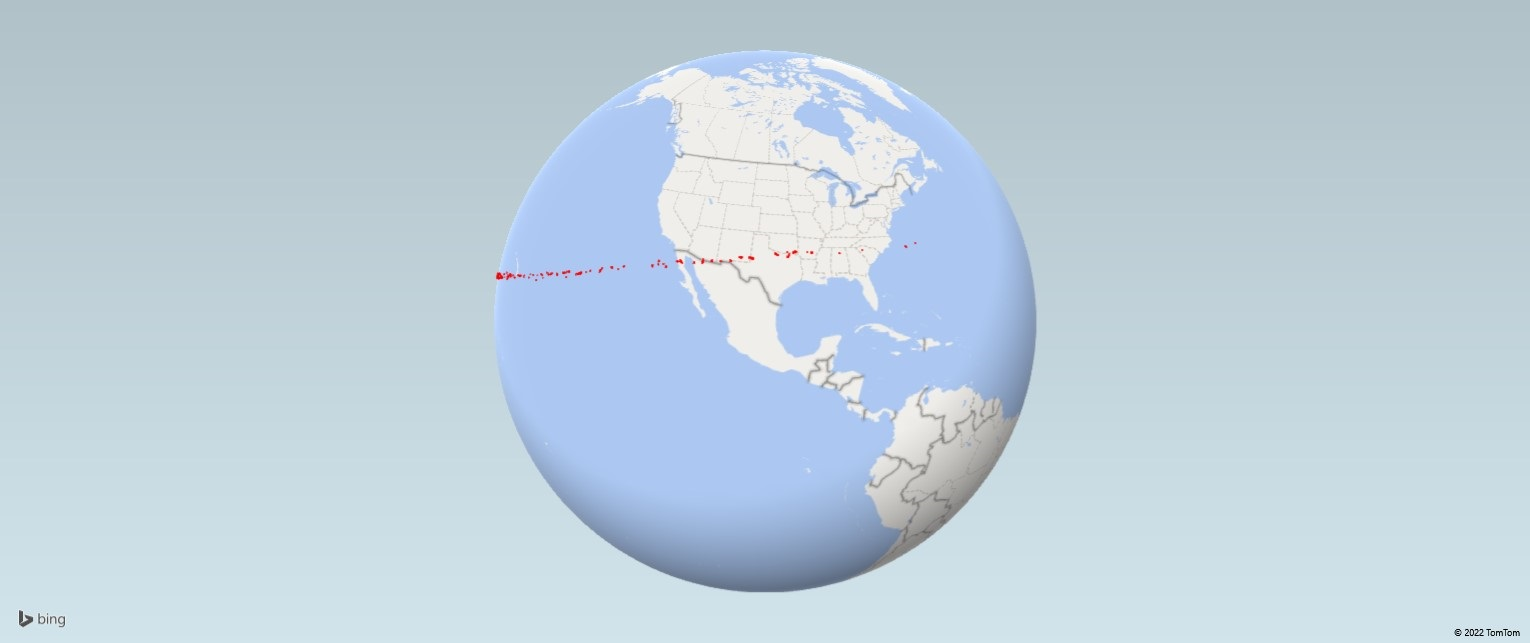
Risk corridor over Mexico and the United States

Diagram showing why as the uncertainty region gets smaller the probability of impact can increase and then suddenly drop to 0.
