= List of asteroid close approaches to Earth in 2019 =

- Asteroids which came closer to Earth than the Moon in 2019 by time of discovery
- After closest approach: 47 (58.0%)
- < 24 hours before: 10 (12.3%)
- up to 7 days before: 20 (24.7%)
- > one week before: 4 (4.9%)
- > 7 weeks before: 0 (0.0%)
- > one year before: 0 (0.0%)
Other years

Simulated animation of 66391 Moshup (previously KW4), a binary system asteroid, which came within 15 lunar distances in May 2019

Below is the list of asteroid close approaches to Earth in 2019.

== Timeline of known close approaches less than one lunar distance from Earth ==
A list of known near-Earth asteroid close approaches less than 1 lunar distance (0.0025696 AU (384,410 km; 238,860 mi)) from Earth in 2019, based on the close approach database of the Center for Near-Earth Object Studies (CNEOS). 2019 was the first year ever when four close approaches of previously undiscovered asteroids were successfully predicted over a week in advance.

For reference, the radius of Earth is approximately 0.0000426 AU (6,370 km; 3,960 mi) or 0.0166 lunar distances.
Geosynchronous satellites have an orbit with semi-major axis length of 0.000282 AU (42,200 km; 26,200 mi) or 0.110 lunar distances. A number of known asteroids came closer than this in 2019.

The largest asteroid to pass within 1 LD of Earth in 2019 was 2019 OK with an estimated diameter of around 95 meters and an absolute magnitude of 23.3. The fastest asteroid to pass within 1 LD of Earth in 2019 was 2019 FC_{1} that passed Earth with a velocity with respect to Earth of 25.9 km/s (58,000 mph). (Note: 2019 FC_{1} passed Earth with a velocity with respect to Earth of 25.9 km/s and was moving away from the Sun at 37.1 km/s.)

The CNEOS database of close approaches lists some close approaches a full orbit or more before the discovery of the object, derived by orbit calculation. The list below only includes close approaches that are evidenced by observations, thus the pre-discovery close approaches are only included if the object was found by precovery.

This list and relevant databases do not consider impacts as close approaches, thus this list does not include 2019 MO, an asteroid which was predicted to impact on Earth and burned up in its atmosphere, as well as several more objects that collided with Earth's atmosphere in 2019 which weren't discovered in advance, but were observed visually or recorded by sensors designed to detect detonation of nuclear devices.

Rows highlighted red indicate objects which were not discovered until after closest approach

Rows highlighted yellow indicate objects discovered less than 24 hours before closest approach

Rows highlighted green indicate objects discovered more than one week before closest approach

Rows highlighted turquoise indicate objects discovered more than 7 weeks before closest approach

Rows highlighted blue indicate objects discovered more than one year before closest approach
(i.e. objects successfully cataloged on a previous orbit, rather than being detected during final approach)

Date of closest approach	Date discovered	Object	Nominal geocentric distance (AU) (Note: Distance from the center of Earth to the center of the object. See the NASA/JPL Solar System Dynamics Glossary: Geocentric. Earth has a radius of approximately 6,400 km.)	Nominal geocentric distance (LD)	Size (m) (approximate)	(H) (abs. mag.)	Closer approach to Moon	Refs
2019-01-08	2019-01-08	2019 AS5	0.000101 AU (15,100 km; 9,400 mi)	0.039	0.92–2.1	32.3	—	data · 2019 AS_{5}
2019-01-12	2019-01-11	2019 AE_{9}	0.000666 AU (99,600 km; 61,900 mi)	0.259	9.7–22	27.2	—	data · 2019 AE_{9}
2019-01-16	2019-01-17	2019 BO	0.000459 AU (68,700 km; 42,700 mi)	0.179	6.4–14	28.1	—	data · 2019 BO
2019-01-16 (Note: A perigee during the asteroid's capture as temporary satellite by Earth)	2020-02-15 (Note: Precovery around this close approach: 2019-01-17 & 2019-01-24)	2020 CD3	0.00108 AU (162,000 km; 100,000 mi)	0.422	1.2–2.7	31.7	—	data · 2020 CD_{3}
2019-01-24	2019-01-25	2019 BV_{1}	0.000904 AU (135,200 km; 84,000 mi)	0.352	4.6–10	28.8	—	data · 2019 BV_{1}
2019-01-27	2019-01-28	2019 BZ3	0.000322 AU (48,200 km; 29,900 mi)	0.125	4.7–10	28.8	—	data · 2019 BZ_{3}
2019-02-11	2019-02-12	2019 CN_{5}	0.000793 AU (118,600 km; 73,700 mi)	0.309	7–16	27.9	—	data · 2019 CN_{5}
2019-02-26	2019-02-28	2019 DG_{2}	0.00158 AU (236,000 km; 147,000 mi)	0.614	5.3–12	28.5	—	data · 2019 DG_{2}
2019-02-26	2019-02-26	2019 DF	0.00116 AU (174,000 km; 108,000 mi)	0.450	2.9–6.5	29.8	—	data · 2019 DF
2019-03-01	2019-03-01	2019 EH_{1}	0.000157 AU (23,500 km; 14,600 mi)	0.061	2.5–5.6	30.1	—	data · 2019 EH_{1}
2019-03-13	2019-03-14	2019 EN_{2}	0.00221 AU (331,000 km; 205,000 mi)	0.861	8–18	27.6	—	data · 2019 EN_{2}
2019-03-16	2019-03-16	2019 FA	0.00154 AU (230,000 km; 143,000 mi)	0.796	4.7–11	28.8	—	data · 2019 FA
2019-03-22	2019-03-09	2019 EA_{2}	0.00205 AU (307,000 km; 191,000 mi)	0.796	18–41	25.8	—	data · 2019 EA_{2}
2019-03-23	2019-03-25	2019 FQ	0.00220 AU (329,000 km; 205,000 mi)	0.858	10–23	27.1	—	data · 2019 FQ_{2}
2019-03-28	2019-03-29	2019 FC_{1}	0.000690 AU (103,200 km; 64,100 mi)	0.268	20–45	25.6	?	data · 2019 FC_{1}
2019-03-31	2019-03-29	2019 FV_{1}	0.00223 AU (334,000 km; 207,000 mi)	0.869	4.4–9.9	28.9	?	data · 2019 FV_{1}
2019-03-31	2019-04-03	2019 GP_{21}	0.00238 AU (356,000 km; 221,000 mi)	0.927	2.9–6.5	29.8	?	data · 2019 GP_{21}
2019-04-12	2019-04-09	2019 GN_{20}	0.00253 AU (378,000 km; 235,000 mi)	0.983	13–30	26.5	?	data · 2019 GN_{20}
2019-04-18	2019-04-09	2019 GC6	0.00146 AU (218,000 km; 136,000 mi)	0.570	13–30	26.5	?	data · 2019 GC_{6}
2019-04-20	2019-04-21	2019 HE	0.00150 AU (224,000 km; 139,000 mi)	0.582	12–27	26.7	?	data · 2019 HE
2019-04-30	2019-05-01	2019 JK	0.00178 AU (266,000 km; 165,000 mi)	0.694	6.7–15	28.0	?	data · 2019 JK
2019-05-02	2019-05-03	2019 JX_{1}	0.00120 AU (180,000 km; 112,000 mi)	0.467	4.0–9.0	29.1	?	data · 2019 JX_{1}
2019-05-05	2019-05-06	2019 JY_{2}	0.000978 AU (146,300 km; 90,900 mi)	0.380	3.2–7.1	29.6	?	data · 2019 JY_{2}
2019-05-13	2019-05-13	2019 JP_{144}	0.00227 AU (340,000 km; 211,000 mi)	0.885	8.6–19	27.4	?	data · 2019 JP_{144}
2019-05-16	2019-05-14	2019 JH_{7}	0.000478 AU (71,500 km; 44,400 mi)	0.186	3.2–7.1	29.6	?	data · 2019 JH_{7}
2019-05-28	2019-05-26	2019 KT	0.00217 AU (325,000 km; 202,000 mi)	0.846	13–28	26.6	?	data · 2019 KT
2019-06-05	2019-06-06	2019 LD_{42}	0.000911 AU (136,300 km; 84,700 mi)	0.355	4.8–11	28.7	?	data · 2019 LD_{42}
2019-06-06	2019-06-06	2019 LY_{4}	0.000559 AU (83,600 km; 52,000 mi)	0.218	7.3–16	27.8	?	data · 2019 LY_{4}
2019-06-08	2019-06-02	2019 LW_{4}	0.00166 AU (248,000 km; 154,000 mi)	0.645	9.2–21	27.3	?	data · 2019 LW_{4}
2019-07-02	2019-07-04	2019 NK_{1}	0.00177 AU (265,000 km; 165,000 mi)	0.690	2.8–6.2	29.9	?	data · 2019 NK_{1}
2019-07-09	2019-06-29	2019 MB_{4}	0.00211 AU (316,000 km; 196,000 mi)	0.820	17–38	26.0	?	data · 2019 MB_{4}
2019-07-09	2019-07-09	2019 NF_{7}	0.00253 AU (378,000 km; 235,000 mi)	0.984	6.4–14	28.1	?	data · 2019 NF_{7}
2019-07-10	2019-07-07	2019 NN_{3}	0.00214 AU (320,000 km; 199,000 mi)	0.833	31–68	24.7	?	data · 2019 NN_{3}
2019-07-24	2019-07-21	2019 OD	0.00239 AU (358,000 km; 222,000 mi)	0.931	56–120	23.4	?	data · 2019 OD
2019-07-25	2019-07-24 (Note: 2019-07-04 is the official first observation date for this asteroid, credited to the SONEAR Observatory, Oliveira by the Minor Planet Center. However the object had been observed several times by other telescopes in the run up, but had not been recognised as an asteroid by their automated systems. See 2019 OK for more details)	2019 OK	0.000477 AU (71,400 km; 44,300 mi)	0.186	58–130	23.3	?	data · 2019 OK
2019-07-28	2019-07-27	2019 OD_{3}	0.00126 AU (188,000 km; 117,000 mi)	0.489	11–25	26.9	?	data · 2019 OD_{3}
2019-07-29	2019-07-30	2019 ON_{3}	0.00143 AU (214,000 km; 133,000 mi)	0.555	7.2–16	27.8	?	data · 2019 ON_{3}
2019-08-20	2019-08-22	2019 QB_{1}	0.000827 AU (123,700 km; 76,900 mi)	0.322	8.4–19	27.5	?	data · 2019 QB_{1}
2019-08-20	2019-08-21	2019 QH_{2}	0.000330 AU (49,400 km; 30,700 mi)	0.128	2.2–4.9	30.4	?	data · 2019 QH_{2}
2019-08-22	2019-08-21	2019 QD	0.00200 AU (299,000 km; 186,000 mi)	0.780	4.6–10	28.8	?	data · 2019 QD
2019-08-26	2019-08-28	2019 QR_{8}	0.00207 AU (310,000 km; 192,000 mi)	0.804	7.0–16	27.9	?	data · 2019 QR_{8}
2019-08-26	2019-08-27	2019 QQ_{3}	0.000636 AU (95,100 km; 59,100 mi)	0.248	3.7–8.2	29.3	?	data · 2019 QQ_{3}
2019-09-02	2019-09-03	2019 RQ	0.000739 AU (110,600 km; 68,700 mi)	0.287	2.0–4.5	30.6	?	data · 2019 RQ
2019-09-05	2019-09-06	2019 RP_{1}	0.000253 AU (37,800 km; 23,500 mi)	0.099	7.0–16	27.9	?	data · 2019 RP_{1}
2019-09-07	2019-09-05	2019 RC_{1}	0.00123 AU (184,000 km; 114,000 mi)	0.479	4.4–9.9	28.9	?	data · 2019 RC_{1}
2019-09-16	2019-09-19	2019 SJ	0.00163 AU (244,000 km; 152,000 mi)	0.636	8.0–18	27.6	?	data · 2019 SJ
2019-09-21	2019-09-22	2019 SU_{2}	0.000481 AU (72,000 km; 44,700 mi)	0.187	2.5–5.7	30.1	?	data · 2019 SU_{2}
2019-09-21	2019-09-20	2019 SD_{1}	0.00187 AU (280,000 km; 174,000 mi)	0.728	5.3–12	28.5	?	data · 2019 SD_{1}
2019-09-21	2019-09-22	2019 SS_{2}	0.000768 AU (114,900 km; 71,400 mi)	0.299	1.9–4.3	30.7	?	data · 2019 SS_{2}
2019-09-22	2019-09-25	2019 SS_{3}	0.00188 AU (281,000 km; 175,000 mi)	0.731	15–34	26.2	?	data · 2019 SS_{3}
2019-09-28	2019-09-30	2019 SX_{8}	0.00255 AU (381,000 km; 237,000 mi)	0.993	4.4–9.9	28.9	?	data · 2019 SX_{8}
2019-09-28	2019-10-01	2019 TE	0.00238 AU (356,000 km; 221,000 mi)	0.927	6.7–15	28.0	?	data · 2019 TE
2019-09-29	2019-10-01	2019 TD	0.000869 AU (130,000 km; 80,800 mi)	0.338	3.8–8.6	29.2	?	data · 2019 TD
2019-10-01	2019-09-30	2019 SM_{8}	0.00106 AU (159,000 km; 99,000 mi)	0.414	3.8–8.6	29.2	?	data · 2019 SM_{8}
2019-10-03	2019-09-22	2019 SP_{3}	0.00249 AU (372,000 km; 231,000 mi)	0.967	15–34	26.2	?	data · 2019 SP_{3}
2019-10-05	2019-10-06	2019 TN_{5}	0.000827 AU (123,700 km; 76,900 mi)	0.322	5.8–13	28.3	?	data · 2019 TN_{5}
2019-10-18	2019-10-19	2019 UU_{1}	0.00151 AU (226,000 km; 140,000 mi)	0.588	2.2–4.9	30.4	?	data · 2019 UU_{1}
2019-10-18	2019-10-19	2019 UG	0.00215 AU (322,000 km; 200,000 mi)	0.838	6.4–14	28.1	?	data · 2019 UG
2019-10-19	2019-10-22	2019 UL_{3}	0.00199 AU (298,000 km; 185,000 mi)	0.774	5.8–13	28.3	?	data · 2019 UL_{3}
2019-10-23	2019-10-25	2019 UN_{8}	0.00241 AU (361,000 km; 224,000 mi)	0.938	3.1–6.8	29.7	?	data · 2019 UN_{8}
2019-10-25	2019-10-26	2019 UO_{8}	0.00105 AU (157,000 km; 98,000 mi)	0.409	3.7–8.2	29.3	?	data · 2019 UO_{8}
2019-10-26	2019-10-29	2019 UX_{12}	0.00256 AU (383,000 km; 238,000 mi)	0.995	4.8–11	28.7	?	data · 2019 UX_{12}
2019-10-27	2019-10-28	2019 UD_{10}	0.00112 AU (168,000 km; 104,000 mi)	0.436	6.1–14	28.2	?	data · 2019 UD_{10}
2019-10-29	2019-10-26	2019 UB_{8} (AKA 2019 US_{8})	0.00127 AU (190,000 km; 118,000 mi)	0.496	4.2–9.4	29.0	?	data · 2019 UB_{8}
2019-10-31	2019-10-31	2019 UN13	0.0000843 AU (12,610 km; 7,840 mi)	0.033	1.0–2.4	32.0	?	data · 2019 UN_{13}
2019-11-01	2019-10-29	2019 UG_{11}	0.00140 AU (209,000 km; 130,000 mi)	0.546	12–26	26.8	?	data · 2019 UG_{11}
2019-11-01	2019-11-04	2019 VC_{37}	0.00157 AU (235,000 km; 146,000 mi)	0.613	3.1–6.9	29.7	?	data · 2019 VC_{37}
2019-11-02	2019-11-01	2019 VA	0.000711 AU (106,400 km; 66,100 mi)	0.277	5.6–12	28.4	?	data · 2019 VA
2019-11-04	2019-11-01	2019 VD	0.00117 AU (175,000 km; 109,000 mi)	0.453	8.8–20	27.4	?	data · 2019 VD
2019-11-04	2019-11-03	2019 VR	0.000912 AU (136,400 km; 84,800 mi)	0.355	6.4–14	28.1	?	data · 2019 VR
2019-11-06	2019-11-06	2019 VS_{4}	0.000931 AU (139,300 km; 86,500 mi)	0.362	9.2–21	27.3	?	data · 2019 VS_{4}
2019-11-09	2019-11-08	2019 VB_{5}	0.000975 AU (145,900 km; 90,600 mi)	0.379	1.2–2.7	31.7	?	data · 2019 VB_{5}
2019-11-09	2019-11-05	2019 VF_{5}	0.00127 AU (190,000 km; 118,000 mi)	0.495	8.4–19	27.5	?	data · 2019 VF_{5}
2019-11-19	2019-11-18	2019 WH	0.000570 AU (85,300 km; 53,000 mi)	0.222	15–34	26.2	?	data · 2019 WH
2019-11-19	2019-11-24	2019 WV_{1}	0.00185 AU (277,000 km; 172,000 mi)	0.721	6.7–15	28.0	?	data · 2019 WV_{1}
2019-11-23	2019-11-24	2019 WG_{2}	0.00121 AU (181,000 km; 112,000 mi)	0.471	27–61	24.9	?	data · 2019 WG_{2}
2019-11-30	2019-11-29	2019 WJ_{4}	0.00219 AU (328,000 km; 204,000 mi)	0.853	5.6–12	28.4	?	data · 2019 WJ_{4}
2019-12-18	2019-12-17	2019 YB	0.00113 AU (169,000 km; 105,000 mi)	0.440	3.1–6.8	29.7	?	data · 2019 YB
2019-12-18	2019-12-19	2019 YS	0.000436 AU (65,200 km; 40,500 mi)	0.170	1.3–3.0	31.5	?	data · 2019 YS
2019-12-23	2019-12-24	2019 YU_{2}	0.000658 AU (98,400 km; 61,200 mi)	0.256	8.8–20	27.4	?	data · 2019 YU_{2}
2019-12-25	2019-12-30	2019 YV_{4}	0.00251 AU (375,000 km; 233,000 mi)	0.977	9.2–21	27.3	?	data · 2019 YV_{4}

In addition to the confirmed asteroids on the above list, which feature in the CNEOS close approach database, there have been well-observed unconfirmed or confirmed but poorly observed objects with a 50% or greater chance of passing within 1 LD of the Earth, which are listed separately below.

Date of closest approach	Date discovered	Object	Nominal geocentric distance (AU)	Nominal geocentric distance (LD)	Size (m) (approximate)	(H) (abs. mag.)	Closer approach to Moon	Refs
2019-01-12	2019-01-16	P10LI6O	0.0023 AU (340,000 km; 210,000 mi)	0.90 (Note: Distance error: 0.0012 AU, approach range: 0.40 to 1.36 LD. The asteroid is unconfirmed and will likely never receive a provisional designation.)	3–18	28.6	?	Pseudo-MPEC; CNEOS Distance (H) (T)
2019-01-17	2019-01-16	P10LGkb	0.000225 AU (33,700 km; 20,900 mi)	0.088 (Note: Distance error: 0.000420 AU, approach range: 0.016 to 0.25 LD. There was a roughly 2% chance of impact. The asteroid is most likely between 1 and 14 meters across, so would probably be detectable. The asteroid is unconfirmed and will likely never receive a provisional designation.)	1–3	31.6	—	Pseudo-MPEC; CNEOS Distance (H) (T)
2019-01-27	2019-01-28	C04U1L2	0.0015 AU (220,000 km; 140,000 mi)	0.60 (Note: distance error: 0.0008 AU, approach range: 0.27 to 0.90 LD. The asteroid is unconfirmed and will likely never receive a provisional designation.)	2–12	29.4	?	Pseudo-MPEC; CNEOS Distance (H) (T)
2019-02-09	2019-02-09	C03CZA1	0.00175 AU (262,000 km; 163,000 mi)	0.68 (Note: distance error: 0.0010 AU, approach range: 0.30 to 1.07 LD. The asteroid is unconfirmed and will likely never receive a provisional designation.)	9–30	26.9	—	Pseudo-MPEC; CNEOS Distance (H) (T)
2019-03-04	2019-03-05	C09Q4H2	0.000178 AU (26,600 km; 16,500 mi)	0.069 (Note: the asteroid is unconfirmed and will likely never receive a provisional designation.)	1–3	31.9	—	Pseudo-MPEC; CNEOS Distance (T)
2019-03-04	2019-03-04	C04H931	0.0014 AU (210,000 km; 130,000 mi)	0.54 (Note: distance error: 0.0004 AU, approach range: 0.39 to 0.70 LD. The asteroid is unconfirmed and will likely never receive a provisional designation.)	5–19	28.0	?	Pseudo-MPEC; CNEOS Distance (H) (T)
2019-03-06	2019-03-07	C0A1UN2	0.0000526 AU (7,870 km; 4,890 mi)	0.020 (Note: distance error: 0.00013 AU. The asteroid is unconfirmed and will likely never receive a provisional designation. The asteroid may have impacted Earth.)	0.4–1.3	33.5	—	
2019-04-06	2019-04-05	A10cQ6k	0.000989 AU (148,000 km; 91,900 mi)	0.39 (Note: distance error: 0.00020 AU. The asteroid is unconfirmed and will likely never receive a provisional designation.)	6.7–22	27.5	—	
2019-05-01	2019-05-01	C093PF1	0.000588 AU (88,000 km; 54,700 mi)	0.23 (Note: distance error: 0.00000085 AU. The asteroid is unconfirmed and will likely never receive a provisional designation.)	1.9–6.2	30.2	—	
2019-05-03	2019-05-04	C0M3DQ2	0.000879 AU (131,500 km; 81,700 mi)	0.34 (Note: distance error: 0.00032 AU. The asteroid is unconfirmed and will likely never receive a provisional designation.)	5.1–16	28.1	—	

=== Warning times by size ===
This sub-section visualises the warning times of the close approaches listed in the table of confirmed close approaches, depending on the size of the asteroid. The sizes of the charts show the relative sizes of the asteroids to scale. For comparison, the approximate size of a person is also shown. This is based the absolute magnitude of each asteroid, an approximate measure of size based on brightness.

Absolute magnitude H ≥ 30 (smallest)

Silhouette of man standing and facing forward

(size of a person for comparison)

Absolute magnitude 30 > H ≥ 29

Absolute magnitude 29 > H ≥ 28

Absolute magnitude 28 > H ≥ 27

Absolute magnitude 27 > H ≥ 26

Absolute magnitude 26 > H ≥ 25

Absolute magnitude 25 > H (largest)

- After closest approach: 1 (20.0%)
- < 24 hours before: 0 (0.0%)
- up to 7 days before: 3 (60.0%)
- > one week before: 1 (20.0%)
- > 7 weeks before: 0 (0.0%)
- > one year before: 0 (0.0%)

== Timeline of close approaches less than one lunar distance from the Moon ==
The number of asteroids listed here are significantly less than those of asteroids that approach Earth for several reasons. Asteroids that approach Earth not only move faster, but are brighter and are easier to detect with modern surveys because:

- Asteroids that come closer to Earth are a higher priority to confirm, and only confirmed asteroids are listed with a lunocentric approach distance.
- Those that closely approach the Moon are frequently lost in its glare, making them harder to confirm. They are similarly hard to discover during the new moon, when the Moon is too close to the Sun to detect asteroids while they are near the Moon.

These factors severely limit the amount of Moon-approaching asteroids, to a level many times lower than the asteroids detected passing as close to Earth.

Date of closest approach	Object	Nominal lunocentric distance (AU) (Note: Distance from the center of the Moon to the center of the object. The Moon has a radius of approximately 1,740 km.)	Nominal lunocentric distance (LD)	Size (m) (approximate)	(H)	approach distance to Earth (LD)	Refs
2019-01-04	2019 AB	0.00246 AU (368,000 km; 229,000 mi)	0.96	10–43	26.3	1.43	data · 2019 AB
2019-01-07	2019 AS5	0.00107 AU (160,000 km; 99,000 mi)	0.41	0.7–2.5	32.2	0.039	data · 2019 AS_{5}
2019-01-15	2019 BO	0.00221 AU (331,000 km; 205,000 mi)	0.86	5–18	28.0	0.18	data · 2019 BO
2019-01-25	2019 BV_{1}	0.00134 AU (200,000 km; 125,000 mi)	0.52	3–14	28.7	0.35	data · 2019 BV_{1}
2019-01-27	2019 BZ3	0.00234 AU (350,000 km; 218,000 mi)	0.91	4–12	28.7	0.13	data · 2019 BZ_{3}
2019-02-10	C03CZA1	0.00239 AU (358,000 km; 222,000 mi)	0.93 (Note: Distance error: 0.0010 AU, approach range: 0.54 to 1.32 LD. The asteroid is unconfirmed and will likely never receive a provisional designation.)	9–30	26.9	0.68	Pseudo-MPEC; CNEOS Distance (H) (T)
2019-02-11	2019 CN_{5}	0.00181 AU (271,000 km; 168,000 mi)	0.70	6–19	27.8	0.31	data · 2019 CN_{5}
2019-02-11	2019 CY_{5}	0.00252 AU (377,000 km; 234,000 mi)	0.98	12–45	26.1	1.42	data · 2019 CY_{5}
2019-02-26	2019 DS_{1}	0.00242 AU (362,000 km; 225,000 mi)	0.94	15–51	25.6	1.89	data · 2019 DS_{1}
2019-02-26	2019 DM_{1}	0.00223 AU (334,000 km; 207,000 mi)	0.87	5–18	28.0	1.32	data · 2019 DM_{1}
2019-02-27	2019 DF	0.00170 AU (254,000 km; 158,000 mi)	0.66	2–8	29.7	0.47	data · 2019 DF
2019-03-01	2019 EH_{1}	0.00184 AU (275,000 km; 171,000 mi)	0.72	2–6	30.1	0.061	data · 2019 EH_{1}
2019-03-04	C09Q4H2	0.00256 AU (383,000 km; 238,000 mi)	0.998 (Note: the asteroid is unconfirmed and will likely never receive a provisional designation.)	1–3	31.9	0.069	Pseudo-MPEC; CNEOS Distance (T)

== Additional examples ==
Radar image of 2016 AZ8 and its satellite during close approach in January 2019

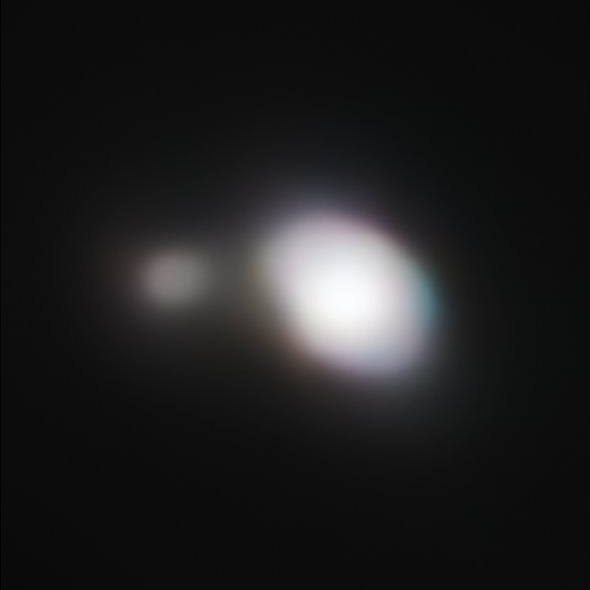
Moshup and its satellite Squannit imaged by the VLT during closest approach in May 2019

An example list of near-Earth asteroids that passed more than 1 lunar distance (384,400 km or 0.00256 AU) from Earth in 2019.

Object	Size meters	lunar distances	Date	Ref
2016 AZ8	215	11.59	2019-01-07	JPL · CAD
2019 BE5	40	3.05	2019-01-30	JPL · CAD
2015 EG	25	1.16+1.16 −0.02	2019-03-04	JPL · CAD
2016 GE_{1}	16	3.88+9.96 −2.77	2019-04-04 ± 5	JPL · CAD
2018 VX_{8}	111	6.15±0.09	2019-05-12	JPL · CAD
(12538) 1998 OH	1663	72.71	2019-05-16	JPL · CAD
2012 KT_{12}	19	6.4 (Note: 2012 KT12 could have potentially passed less than 1 lunar distance to Earth, but the chances were fairly low and as such it was not listed in the main table unless followup observations confirmed that it would pass less than 1 LD from Earth. It was recovered on 2 May 2019.)	2019-05-17	JPL · CAD
66391 Moshup	1317	13.48	2019-05-25	JPL · CAD
(441987) 2010 NY_{65}	228	7.27	2019-06-24	JPL · CAD
2016 NO_{56}	25	3.41+36.86 −2.41	2019-07-07 ± 6	JPL · CAD
2019 PG1	270	61.53	2019-07-24	JPL · CAD
2010 PK_{9}	138	8.20	2019-07-26	JPL · CAD
2011 PN_{1}	11	61.97+90.70 −61.00	2019-08-07 ± 5	JPL · CAD
(66146) 1998 TU_{3}	2864	28.89	2019-08-25	JPL · CAD
2019 OU1	115	2.67	2019-08-28	JPL · CAD
1620 Geographos	2560	53.42	2019-08-31	JPL · CAD
2009 EH_{1}	9	58.91+76.41 −58.43	2019-09-09 ± 9	JPL · CAD
2100 Ra-Shalom	2300	69.94	2019-09-21	JPL · CAD
2016 XA_{2}	164	66.91+66.18 −65.98	2019-12-06 ± 7	JPL · CAD

== Virtual impactors ==
Listed are asteroids that are included on the Sentry Risk Table because they have short observation arcs with poorly constrained orbits and have a chance of striking Earth in 2019. Given a short observation arc, many different orbits fit the observed data. These objects could be millions if not billions of kilometers from Earth on the date of a low probability virtual impactor. For example, 2008 SH_{148} is expected to be 5.3 AU (800 million km) from Earth in October 2019 around the time of the virtual impact.

Cumulatively among the asteroids listed below, there is a roughly 1 in 16,500 chance that any of the asteroids will impact Earth in 2019. Most of this comes from asteroid 2006 QV89 which formerly had a 1 in 20,000 chance of impact on 9 September 2019, but the impact was ruled out in August.

Also included are asteroids discovered before impact and exceptionally massive fireballs with either an equivalent yield of more than 1 kiloton of TNT or an estimated size of more than 3 meters.

Date	Object	Estimated diameter (meters)	Obs arc (days)	Impact probability (1 in)	Sigma from best-fit orbit (Note: This is a measurement of how far off of the "best fit" orbit the asteroid would have to have for it to hit at this time. Further values from 0 mean that the measured positions of the asteroid used to calculate its orbit would need to be highly inaccurate for it to hit Earth. For reference, 1.0/-1.0=31.7% odds the observations would be this inaccurate, 2.0/-2.0=4.6% odds, 3.0/-3.0=0.27% odds.)	Palermo scale	JPL Horizons nominal geocentric distance (AU)	NEODyS nominal geocentric distance (AU)
2019-01-06	2005 NX_{55}	80–260	1.1	710,000,000	-2.461	-5.51	2.8 AU (420,000,000 km; 260,000,000 mi)	3.0 AU (450,000,000 km; 280,000,000 mi)
2019-01-06	2010 JA_{43}	459–497	2.7	210,000,000	-2.004	-4.32	2.4 AU (360,000,000 km; 220,000,000 mi)	2.9 AU (430,000,000 km; 270,000,000 mi)
2019-01-07	2014 HN_{198} (Note: 2014 HN198 was ruled out as a potential impactor after further observations from Cerro Tololo, improving the orbit enough to determine that it won't hit Earth.)	15–47	5.9 (0.99)	N/A (1,400,000,000)	N/A (-0.160)	N/A (-8.09)	1.5 AU (220,000,000 km; 140,000,000 mi)	1.5 AU (220,000,000 km; 140,000,000 mi)
2019-01-08	2010 DG_{77} (Note: 2010 DG_{77} has a cumulative probability of 1 in 195,000,000 (Palermo scale -6.89) of impacting Earth in 2019.) (Note: This listing is compiled from 3 separate virtual impacts at the exact same time, and simply spread out by several sigma. The probabilities are updated to reflect the duplicated listings.)	309–321	0.60	220,000,000	-4.057	-6.94	3.0 AU (450,000,000 km; 280,000,000 mi)	0.52 AU (78,000,000 km; 48,000,000 mi)
2019-01-10	2008 EL_{68} (Note: 2008 EL_{68} has a cumulative probability of 1 in 703,000 (Palermo scale -6.14) of impacting Earth in 2019.)	6–20	0.071	36,000,000	-1.475	-7.80	1.4 AU (210,000,000 km; 130,000,000 mi)	1.2 AU (180,000,000 km; 110,000,000 mi)
2019-01-10	2016 AZ_{193} (Note: 2016 AZ_{193} has a cumulative probability of 1 in 223,000,000 (Palermo scale -8.00) of impacting Earth in 2019.)	10–35	0.16	4,200,000,000	-3.197	-8.22	1.3 AU (190,000,000 km; 120,000,000 mi)	1.3 AU (190,000,000 km; 120,000,000 mi)
2019-01-11	2010 DG_{77}	309–321	0.60	4,200,000,000	-2.874	-6.91	3.0 AU (450,000,000 km; 280,000,000 mi)	0.51 AU (76,000,000 km; 47,000,000 mi)
2019-01-11	2010 DG_{77}	309–321	0.60	2,900,000,000	-2.297	-6.52	3.0 AU (450,000,000 km; 280,000,000 mi)	0.51 AU (76,000,000 km; 47,000,000 mi)
2019-01-11	2010 XC (Note: 2010 XC has a cumulative probability of 1 in 16,600,000 (Palermo scale -7.90) of impacting Earth in 2019.)	3–12	0.058	17,000,000	-1.593	-7.91	2.4 AU (360,000,000 km; 220,000,000 mi)	2.4 AU (360,000,000 km; 220,000,000 mi)
2019-01-20	2016 AZ_{193}	10–35	0.16	1,400,000,000	-3.137	-9.15	1.3 AU (190,000,000 km; 120,000,000 mi)	1.3 AU (190,000,000 km; 120,000,000 mi)
2019-02-01	N/A (not discovered before impact)	4	N/A	1	0.000	0	N/A (impact)	N/A (impact)
2019-02-07	2015 HV_{182} (Note: 2015 HV_{182} has a cumulative probability of 1 in 140,000,000 (Palermo scale -5.39) of impacting Earth in 2019.)	92–300	1.0	1,100,000,000	-0.900	-5.81	2.1 AU (310,000,000 km; 200,000,000 mi)	2.1 AU (310,000,000 km; 200,000,000 mi)
2019-02-15	2009 VZ_{39} (Note: 2009 VZ_{39} has a cumulative probability of 1 in 16,200,000 (Palermo scale -7.53) of impacting Earth in 2019.)	5–16	0.043	290,000,000	0.751	-8.30	0.082 AU (12,300,000 km; 7,600,000 mi)	2.3 AU (340,000,000 km; 210,000,000 mi)
2019-02-15	2011 CF_{66} (Note: 2011 CF_{66} has a cumulative probability of 1 in 50,800,000 (Palermo scale -7.75) of impacting Earth in 2019.)	7–23	0.18	62,000,000	-2.603	-7.84	1.3 AU (190,000,000 km; 120,000,000 mi)	0.29 AU (43,000,000 km; 27,000,000 mi)
2019-02-18	2011 CF_{66}	7–23	0.18	280,000,000	-2.921	-8.34	1.3 AU (190,000,000 km; 120,000,000 mi)	0.30 AU (45,000,000 km; 28,000,000 mi)
2019-02-18	N/A (not discovered before impact	5	N/A	1	0.000	0	N/A (impact)	N/A (impact)
2019-02-20	2008 JD_{33}	14–59	0.12	260,000,000	-2.901	-8.73	4.4 AU (660,000,000 km; 410,000,000 mi)	4.1 AU (610,000,000 km; 380,000,000 mi)
2019-02-22	2008 EL_{68}	6–20	0.071	1,500,000	-0.914	-6.47	1.5 AU (220,000,000 km; 140,000,000 mi)	1.3 AU (190,000,000 km; 120,000,000 mi)
2019-02-28	2008 EL_{68}	6–20	0.071	4,300,000	-1.271	-6.90	1.5 AU (220,000,000 km; 140,000,000 mi)	1.3 AU (190,000,000 km; 120,000,000 mi)
2019-03-01	2008 EK_{68} (Note: 2008 EK_{68} has a cumulative probability of 1 in 47,600,000 (Palermo scale -8.08) of impacting Earth in 2019.)	3–8	0.040	1,400,000,000	1.826	-9.38	1.2 AU (180,000,000 km; 110,000,000 mi)	1.3 AU (190,000,000 km; 120,000,000 mi)
2019-03-02	2008 EL_{68}	6–20	0.071	8,300,000	-1.469	-7.14	1.5 AU (220,000,000 km; 140,000,000 mi)	1.3 AU (190,000,000 km; 120,000,000 mi)
2019-03-02	2008 EK_{68}	3–8	0.040	830,000,000	2.221	-9.34	1.2 AU (180,000,000 km; 110,000,000 mi)	1.3 AU (190,000,000 km; 120,000,000 mi)
2019-03-03	2008 EL_{68}	6–20	0.071	45,000,000	-2.055	-7.80	1.5 AU (220,000,000 km; 140,000,000 mi)	1.3 AU (190,000,000 km; 120,000,000 mi)
2019-03-03	2008 EL_{68}	6–20	0.071	16,000,000	-1.712	-7.41	1.5 AU (220,000,000 km; 140,000,000 mi)	1.3 AU (190,000,000 km; 120,000,000 mi)
2019-03-03	2008 EK_{68}	3–8	0.040	200,000,000	1.940	-8.93	1.2 AU (180,000,000 km; 110,000,000 mi)	1.3 AU (190,000,000 km; 120,000,000 mi)
2019-03-03	2008 EK_{68}	3–8	0.040	71,000,000	1.771	-8.70	1.2 AU (180,000,000 km; 110,000,000 mi)	1.3 AU (190,000,000 km; 120,000,000 mi)
2019-03-04	2009 VZ_{39}	5–16	0.043	130,000,000	1.257	-7.96	0.15 AU (22,000,000 km; 14,000,000 mi)	2.2 AU (330,000,000 km; 200,000,000 mi)
2019-03-09	2008 EL_{68}	6–20	0.071	5,000,000,000	3.289	-8.75	1.5 AU (220,000,000 km; 140,000,000 mi)	1.3 AU (190,000,000 km; 120,000,000 mi)
2019-03-10	2008 EL_{68}	6–20	0.071	830,000,000	2.871	-8.09	1.5 AU (220,000,000 km; 140,000,000 mi)	1.3 AU (190,000,000 km; 120,000,000 mi)
2019-03-10	2008 EL_{68}	6–20	0.071	91,000,000	2.767	-7.53	1.5 AU (220,000,000 km; 140,000,000 mi)	1.3 AU (190,000,000 km; 120,000,000 mi)
2019-03-11	2008 EM_{68} (Note: 2008 EM_{68} has a cumulative probability of 1 in 427,000 (Palermo scale -5.42) of impacting Earth in 2019.)	7–22	0.11	6,700,000	1.207	-6.51	0.37 AU (55,000,000 km; 34,000,000 mi)	2.3 AU (340,000,000 km; 210,000,000 mi)
2019-03-11	2008 EM_{68}	7–22	0.11	480,000	0.652	-5.47	0.37 AU (55,000,000 km; 34,000,000 mi)	2.3 AU (340,000,000 km; 210,000,000 mi)
2019-03-12	2008 EL_{68}	6–20	0.071	3,600,000	1.085	-6.47	1.5 AU (220,000,000 km; 140,000,000 mi)	1.3 AU (190,000,000 km; 120,000,000 mi)
2019-03-12	2008 EM_{68}	7–22	0.11	11,000,000	1.823	-6.94	0.37 AU (55,000,000 km; 34,000,000 mi)	2.3 AU (340,000,000 km; 210,000,000 mi)
2019-03-14	2008 EM_{68}	7–22	0.11	830,000,000	2.905	-8.91	0.37 AU (55,000,000 km; 34,000,000 mi)	2.4 AU (360,000,000 km; 220,000,000 mi)
2019-04-03	2014 HG_{196} (Note: 2014 HG_{196} has a cumulative probability of 1 in 539,000,000 (Palermo scale -8.09) of impacting Earth in 2019.)	10–33	1.0	590,000,000	2.345	-8.13	2.0 AU (300,000,000 km; 190,000,000 mi)	2.7 AU (400,000,000 km; 250,000,000 mi)
2019-04-03	2014 MV67	220–710	0.94	2,100,000,000	0.441	-4.95	3.5 AU (520,000,000 km; 330,000,000 mi)	1.2 AU (180,000,000 km; 110,000,000 mi)
2019-04-09	2014 HG_{196}	10–33	1.0	6,200,000,000	3.011	-8.98	2.0 AU (300,000,000 km; 190,000,000 mi)	2.8 AU (420,000,000 km; 260,000,000 mi)
2019-04-18	2008 US (Note: 2008 US has a cumulative probability of 1 in 698,000 (Palermo scale -7.38) of impacting Earth in 2019.)	1–4	0.081	43,000,000	-1.780	-9.20	2.6 AU (390,000,000 km; 240,000,000 mi)	2.7 AU (400,000,000 km; 250,000,000 mi)
2019-04-18	2008 US	1–4	0.081	710,000	-1.526	-7.39	2.6 AU (390,000,000 km; 240,000,000 mi)	2.7 AU (400,000,000 km; 250,000,000 mi)
2019-04-29	2017 UK_{52}	7–28	0.18	91,000,000	1.988	-6.92	2.2 AU (330,000,000 km; 200,000,000 mi)	2.2 AU (330,000,000 km; 200,000,000 mi)
2019-05-01	2016 AZ_{193}	10–35	0.16	310,000,000	-2.900	-8.79	1.4 AU (210,000,000 km; 130,000,000 mi)	1.5 AU (220,000,000 km; 140,000,000 mi)
2019-05-04	2014 MA_{68}	16–40	0.95	91,000,000	-3.804	-7.23	2.8 AU (420,000,000 km; 260,000,000 mi)	2.8 AU (420,000,000 km; 260,000,000 mi)
2019-05-07	2009 VZ_{39}	5–16	0.043	260,000,000	1.252	-7.82	0.67 AU (100,000,000 km; 62,000,000 mi)	1.5 AU (220,000,000 km; 140,000,000 mi)
2019-05-21	N/A (not discovered before impact	5	N/A	1	0.000	0	N/A (impact)	N/A (impact)
2019-06-03	2014 LY21 (Note: 2014 LY_{21} has a cumulative probability of 1 in 213,000 (Palermo scale -5.39) of impacting Earth in 2019.)	3–10	0.045	400,000	-0.302	-5.66	0.45 AU (67,000,000 km; 42,000,000 mi)	0.72 AU (108,000,000 km; 67,000,000 mi)
2019-06-03	2014 LY21	3–10	0.045	25,000,000	2.025	-7.89	0.45 AU (67,000,000 km; 42,000,000 mi)	0.72 AU (108,000,000 km; 67,000,000 mi)
2019-06-04	2014 LY21	3–10	0.045	480,000,000	3.015	-9.33	0.46 AU (69,000,000 km; 43,000,000 mi)	0.72 AU (108,000,000 km; 67,000,000 mi)
2019-06-04	2014 LY21	3–10	0.045	670,000	0.351	-6.63	0.46 AU (69,000,000 km; 43,000,000 mi)	0.72 AU (108,000,000 km; 67,000,000 mi)
2019-06-04	2014 LY21	3–10	0.045	1,500,000	0.855	-7.12	0.46 AU (69,000,000 km; 43,000,000 mi)	0.73 AU (109,000,000 km; 68,000,000 mi)
2019-06-12	2015 HV_{182}	92–300	1.0	1,200,000,000	0.518	-6.13	1.1 AU (160,000,000 km; 100,000,000 mi)	1.1 AU (160,000,000 km; 100,000,000 mi)
2019-06-22	2019 MO	6	0.095	1	0.000	>0	0.00004 AU (6,000 km; 3,700 mi) (impact)	0.00004 AU (6,000 km; 3,700 mi) (impact)
2019-07-07	2014 CH_{13}	28–90	0.96	59,000,000	-3.714	-6.25	0.94 AU (141,000,000 km; 87,000,000 mi)	0.82 AU (123,000,000 km; 76,000,000 mi)
2019-07-07	2011 AE_{3}	5–17	0.043	590,000,000	0.765	-7.85	0.72 AU (108,000,000 km; 67,000,000 mi)	0.75 AU (112,000,000 km; 70,000,000 mi)
2019-07-13	2004 ME_{6}	53–250	0.87	1,700,000,000	-2.219	-6.56	1.1 AU (160,000,000 km; 100,000,000 mi)	0.15 AU (22,000,000 km; 14,000,000 mi)
2019-07-21	2012 BL_{14}	5–16	0.12	260,000,000	3.036	-8.26	3.1 AU (460,000,000 km; 290,000,000 mi)	3.1 AU (460,000,000 km; 290,000,000 mi)
2019-08-19	2015 ME131	270–860	1.8	710,000,000	0.809	-4.47	1.3 AU (190,000,000 km; 120,000,000 mi)	1.3 AU (190,000,000 km; 120,000,000 mi)
2019-08-30	2015 HW_{182}	18–57	1.0	450,000,000	-1.745	-7.54	2.1 AU (310,000,000 km; 200,000,000 mi)	2.1 AU (310,000,000 km; 200,000,000 mi)
2019-09-07	2008 EM_{68}	7–22	0.11	220,000,000	2.279	-8.32	0.99 AU (148,000,000 km; 92,000,000 mi)	2.2 AU (330,000,000 km; 200,000,000 mi)
2019-09-09	2006 QV89	18–59	9.9	20,000	2.894	-3.32	0.061 AU (9,100,000 km; 5,700,000 mi)	0.054 AU (8,100,000 km; 5,000,000 mi)
2019-09-11	2008 EM_{68}	7–22	0.11	830,000,000	-1.445	-8.40	0.97 AU (145,000,000 km; 90,000,000 mi)	2.1 AU (310,000,000 km; 200,000,000 mi)
2019-09-12	2008 EM_{68}	7–22	0.11	710,000,000	-0.811	-8.51	0.97 AU (145,000,000 km; 90,000,000 mi)	2.1 AU (310,000,000 km; 200,000,000 mi)
2019-09-12	2008 EM_{68}	7–22	0.11	110,000,000	-0.815	-7.72	0.97 AU (145,000,000 km; 90,000,000 mi)	2.1 AU (310,000,000 km; 200,000,000 mi)
2019-09-13	2008 EM_{68}	7–22	0.11	310,000,000	-1.036	-8.06	0.97 AU (145,000,000 km; 90,000,000 mi)	2.1 AU (310,000,000 km; 200,000,000 mi)
2019-09-13	2008 EM_{68}	7–22	0.11	2,400,000,000	-1.783	-8.73	0.97 AU (145,000,000 km; 90,000,000 mi)	2.1 AU (310,000,000 km; 200,000,000 mi)
2019-09-20	2015 HV_{182}	92–300	1.0	7,700,000,000	0.093	-6.63	2.0 AU (300,000,000 km; 190,000,000 mi)	2.0 AU (300,000,000 km; 190,000,000 mi)
2019-09-22	2009 FZ_{4}	18–57	0.60	30,000,000	1.308	-6.31	1.5 AU (220,000,000 km; 140,000,000 mi)	1.4 AU (210,000,000 km; 130,000,000 mi)
2019-09-23	2015 HV_{182}	92–300	1.0	7,700,000,000	-2.410	-6.99	2.0 AU (300,000,000 km; 190,000,000 mi)	2.0 AU (300,000,000 km; 190,000,000 mi)
2019-10-03	2007 FT3	210–680	1.2	11,000,000	-1.652	-3.17	0.93 AU (139,000,000 km; 86,000,000 mi)	1.1 AU (160,000,000 km; 100,000,000 mi)
2019-10-07	2008 SH_{148}	13–41	0.10	1,600,000,000	3.550	-8.39	5.3 AU (790,000,000 km; 490,000,000 mi)	5.4 AU (810,000,000 km; 500,000,000 mi)
2019-10-09	2015 HV_{182}	92–300	1.0	340,000,000	-0.355	-5.78	2.1 AU (310,000,000 km; 200,000,000 mi)	2.1 AU (310,000,000 km; 200,000,000 mi)
2019-10-11	2006 SF_{281} (Note: This listing is compiled from 16 separate virtual impacts at the exact same time, and simply spread out by several sigma. The probabilities are updated to reflect the duplicated listings.)	8–26	0.027	42,000,000	2.475	-7.08	2.6 AU (390,000,000 km; 240,000,000 mi)	1.4 AU (210,000,000 km; 130,000,000 mi)
2019-10-27	2014 HR_{197} (Note: 2014 HR_{197} has a cumulative probability of 1 in 399,000,000 (Palermo scale -8.16) of impacting Earth in 2019.)	8–26	0.96	9,100,000,000	-3.524	-9.07	2.9 AU (430,000,000 km; 270,000,000 mi)	2.9 AU (430,000,000 km; 270,000,000 mi)
2019-10-28	2014 HR_{197}	8–26	0.96	910,000,000	-3.002	-8.30	2.9 AU (430,000,000 km; 270,000,000 mi)	2.9 AU (430,000,000 km; 270,000,000 mi)
2019-10-28	2008 VL	6–22	0.12	1,500,000,000	-3.610	-9.35	2.0 AU (300,000,000 km; 190,000,000 mi)	2.0 AU (300,000,000 km; 190,000,000 mi)
2019-10-29	2014 HR_{197}	8–26	0.96	770,000,000	-3.196	-8.45	2.9 AU (430,000,000 km; 270,000,000 mi)	2.9 AU (430,000,000 km; 270,000,000 mi)
2019-11-01	2010 VR_{139}	11–31	0.064	38,000,000	-0.745	-7.29	2.2 AU (330,000,000 km; 200,000,000 mi)	2.1 AU (310,000,000 km; 200,000,000 mi)
2019-11-10	2010 VP_{139} (Note: 2010 VP_{139} has a cumulative probability of 1 in 5,950,000 (Palermo scale -7.56) of impacting Earth in 2019.)	13–41	0.046	12,000,000	-2.326	-7.86	1.7 AU (250,000,000 km; 160,000,000 mi)	1.7 AU (250,000,000 km; 160,000,000 mi)
2019-11-12	2010 VP_{139}	13–41	0.046	15,000,000	-2.088	-8.00	1.7 AU (250,000,000 km; 160,000,000 mi)	1.7 AU (250,000,000 km; 160,000,000 mi)
2019-11-12	2009 VZ_{39}	5–16	0.043	430,000,000	-1.453	-8.42	2.9 AU (430,000,000 km; 270,000,000 mi)	1.2 AU (180,000,000 km; 110,000,000 mi)
2019-11-13	2010 VP_{139}	13–41	0.046	56,000,000	-2.556	-8.41	1.7 AU (250,000,000 km; 160,000,000 mi)	1.7 AU (250,000,000 km; 160,000,000 mi)
2019-11-13	2010 VP_{139}	13–41	0.046	4,000,000,000	3.632	-10.1	1.7 AU (250,000,000 km; 160,000,000 mi)	1.7 AU (250,000,000 km; 160,000,000 mi)
2019-11-14	2009 VZ_{39}	5–16	0.043	29,000,000	0.995	-7.78	2.9 AU (430,000,000 km; 270,000,000 mi)	1.2 AU (180,000,000 km; 110,000,000 mi)
2019-11-16	2008 VS_{4} (Note: 2008 VS_{4} has a cumulative probability of 1 in 50,100,000 (Palermo scale -6.30) of impacting Earth in 2019.)	29–87	0.083	5,600,000,000	3.255	-7.62	1.8 AU (270,000,000 km; 170,000,000 mi)	4.2 AU (630,000,000 km; 390,000,000 mi)
2019-11-16	2009 VZ_{39}	5–16	0.043	100,000,000	1.284	-7.90	2.9 AU (430,000,000 km; 270,000,000 mi)	1.2 AU (180,000,000 km; 110,000,000 mi)
2019-11-17	2008 VS_{4}	29–87	0.083	1,100,000,000	2.834	-7.02	1.8 AU (270,000,000 km; 170,000,000 mi)	4.2 AU (630,000,000 km; 390,000,000 mi)
2019-11-19	2008 XK (Note: 2008 XK has a cumulative probability of 1 in 101,000,000 (Palermo scale -7.68) of impacting Earth in 2019.)	8–25	0.087	910,000,000	4.019	-8.84	3.4 AU (510,000,000 km; 320,000,000 mi)	2.4 AU (360,000,000 km; 220,000,000 mi)
2019-11-21	2017 WF_{30} (Note: 2017 WF_{30} has a cumulative probability of 1 in 196,000,000 (Palermo scale -7.67) of impacting Earth in 2019.)	10–31	0.17	1,800,000,000	-2.868	-8.06	0.33 AU (49,000,000 km; 31,000,000 mi)	0.26 AU (39,000,000 km; 24,000,000 mi)
2019-11-23	2017 RZ_{17}	180–590	0.96	290,000,000	1.115	-4.27	3.4 AU (510,000,000 km; 320,000,000 mi)	3.3 AU (490,000,000 km; 310,000,000 mi)
2019-11-23	2007 YM	12–39	0.13	280,000,000	-0.878	-7.81	2.5 AU (370,000,000 km; 230,000,000 mi)	2.5 AU (370,000,000 km; 230,000,000 mi)
2019-12-06	2008 XK	8–25	0.087	200,000,000	-2.287	-7.98	3.6 AU (540,000,000 km; 330,000,000 mi)	2.5 AU (370,000,000 km; 230,000,000 mi)
2019-12-06	2017 WF_{30}	10–31	0.17	220,000,000	2.469	-7.72	0.39 AU (58,000,000 km; 36,000,000 mi)	0.32 AU (48,000,000 km; 30,000,000 mi)
2019-12-08	2010 XC	3–12	0.058	5,900,000,000	3.630	-10.2	2.5 AU (370,000,000 km; 230,000,000 mi)	2.5 AU (370,000,000 km; 230,000,000 mi)
2019-12-09	2010 XC	3–12	0.058	710,000,000	3.253	-9.51	2.5 AU (370,000,000 km; 230,000,000 mi)	2.5 AU (370,000,000 km; 230,000,000 mi)
2019-12-14	2008 VS_{4}	29–87	0.083	53,000,000	1.138	-6.32	1.7 AU (250,000,000 km; 160,000,000 mi)	4.1 AU (610,000,000 km; 380,000,000 mi)
2019-12-15	2014 JT_{79} (Note: 2014 JT_{79} had a cumulative probability of 1 in 44,800,000 (Palermo scale -7.56) of impacting Earth in 2019. It was ruled out as a potential impactor after further observations from Cerro Tololo, improving the orbit enough to determine that it won't hit Earth.)	11–34	6.8 (2.8)	0 (1,300,000,000)	N/A (0.741)	N/A (-8.10)	0.94 AU (141,000,000 km; 87,000,000 mi)	0.94 AU (141,000,000 km; 87,000,000 mi)
2019-12-15	2014 JT_{79}	11–34	6.8 (2.8)	0 (400,000,000)	N/A (0.733)	N/A (-7.86)	0.94 AU (141,000,000 km; 87,000,000 mi)	0.94 AU (141,000,000 km; 87,000,000 mi)
2019-12-16	2010 WW_{8}	9–30	0.066	120,000,000	1.760	-7.51	0.46 AU (69,000,000 km; 43,000,000 mi)	0.97 AU (145,000,000 km; 90,000,000 mi)
2019-12-17	2014 JT_{79}	11–34	6.8 (2.8)	0 (150,000,000)	N/A (-0.905)	N/A (-7.75)	0.94 AU (141,000,000 km; 87,000,000 mi)	0.94 AU (141,000,000 km; 87,000,000 mi)
2019-12-18	2005 TM_{173} (Note: 2005 TM_{173} has a cumulative probability of 1 in 338,000,000 (Palermo scale -6.67) of impacting Earth in 2019.)	28–130	1.9	5,300,000,000	3.220	-8.03	3.4 AU (510,000,000 km; 320,000,000 mi)	5.4 AU (810,000,000 km; 500,000,000 mi)
2019-12-18	2005 TM_{173}	28–130	1.9	500,000,000	-2.460	-6.84	3.4 AU (510,000,000 km; 320,000,000 mi)	5.4 AU (810,000,000 km; 500,000,000 mi)
2019-12-18	2005 TM_{173}	28–130	1.9	1,300,000,000	-2.461	-7.25	3.4 AU (510,000,000 km; 320,000,000 mi)	5.4 AU (810,000,000 km; 500,000,000 mi)
2019-12-19	2014 JT_{79}	11–34	6.8 (2.8)	0 (91,000,000)	N/A (-1.732)	N/A (-7.87)	0.95 AU (142,000,000 km; 88,000,000 mi)	0.95 AU (142,000,000 km; 88,000,000 mi)
2019-12-24	2014 JT_{79}	11–34	6.8 (2.8)	0 (710,000,000)	N/A (-3.598)	N/A (-9.23)	0.96 AU (144,000,000 km; 89,000,000 mi)	0.96 AU (144,000,000 km; 89,000,000 mi)
2019-12-25	2008 XK	8–25	0.087	260,000,000	3.252	-8.39	3.7 AU (550,000,000 km; 340,000,000 mi)	2.6 AU (390,000,000 km; 240,000,000 mi)
2019-12-26	2016 RP_{41}	68–210	0.76	590,000,000	2.440	-6.39	1.2 AU (180,000,000 km; 110,000,000 mi)	1.1 AU (160,000,000 km; 100,000,000 mi)
2019-12-28	2010 GD_{37}	1000–3100	3.3	1,400,000,000	-0.862	-3.38	2.2 AU (330,000,000 km; 200,000,000 mi)	Not listed
2019-12-28	2015 HV_{182}	92–300	1.0	450,000,000	-0.451	-5.91	2.3 AU (340,000,000 km; 210,000,000 mi)	2.3 AU (340,000,000 km; 210,000,000 mi)
2019-12-29	2016 AZ_{193}	10–35	0.16	3,300,000,000	2.902	-8.39	1.6 AU (240,000,000 km; 150,000,000 mi)	1.7 AU (250,000,000 km; 160,000,000 mi)

== See also ==
- List of asteroid close approaches to Earth
- List of asteroid close approaches to Earth in 2018
- List of asteroid close approaches to Earth in 2020
- List of bolides (asteroids and meteoroids that impacted Earth)
- Asteroid impact prediction
