= 2019 OU1 =

Near-Earth asteroid

2019 OU_{1}
Discovery
- Discovered by: Pan-STARRS 1
- Discovery site: Haleakala Obs.
- Discovery date: 25 July 2019 (first observed)

Designations
- Minor planet category: Apollo · NEO

Orbital characteristics
- Epoch 27 April 2019 (JD 2458600.5)
- Uncertainty parameter 6 · 7
- Aphelion: 3.673 au
- Perihelion: 0.5748 au
- Semi-major axis: 2.2679 au
- Eccentricity: 0.61977
- Orbital period (sidereal): 3.42 years
- Mean anomaly: 313.73°
- Mean motion: 0° 17^{m} 18.916^{s} / day
- Inclination: 2.2176°
- Longitude of ascending node: 145.143°
- Argument of perihelion: 241.08°
- Earth MOID: 0.0062 au (2.4 LD)
- Jupiter MOID: 1.79 au

Physical characteristics
- Mean diameter: 71 m (est. at 0.25); 160 m (est. at 0.05)
- Absolute magnitude (H): 22.87

2019 OU_{1} (Note: The name 2019 OU_{1} is its provisional designation which is based on the date it was discovered: 2019 for the year, "O" for half-month of 16–31 July, and "U_{1}" for the 21st discovery in the 1st reiteration of the alphabet (excluding "I"), making it the 45th object discovered in the second half of July 2019.) is a sub-kilometre asteroid, classified as a near-Earth object of the Apollo group. On 28 August 2019, the object safely passed 1.028 million kilometres from Earth, travelling at around 13 km/s (47,000 km/h).

== Observation ==
2019 OU_{1} was first observed on 25 July 2019 by Pan-STARRS 1 at Haleakala Observatory, Hawaii, United States.

== Orbit and classification ==
2019 OU_{1} is classified as an Apollo asteroid, which means that it is an Earth-crossing asteroid that has an orbital semi-major axis greater than 1 au but a perihelion distance less than Earth's aphelion distance of 1.017 au.

=== Close approach in 2019 ===
On 28 August 2019, 2019 OU_{1} safely passed 0.00687 astronomical units (1.028 million kilometres; 2.67 lunar distances) from Earth, travelling at around 13 km/s (47,000 km/h).

== Physical characteristics ==
Based on its absolute magnitude of 22.874, 2019 OU_{1} is estimated to have a diameter of 71–160 metres using an assumed albedo of 0.05 (carbonaceous) and 0.25 (siliceous) respectively.

== See also ==
- List of asteroid close approaches to Earth in 2019
- 2006 QQ23
- 2019 OK
