= 2019 AS5 =

Near-Earth asteroid

2019 AS_{5}
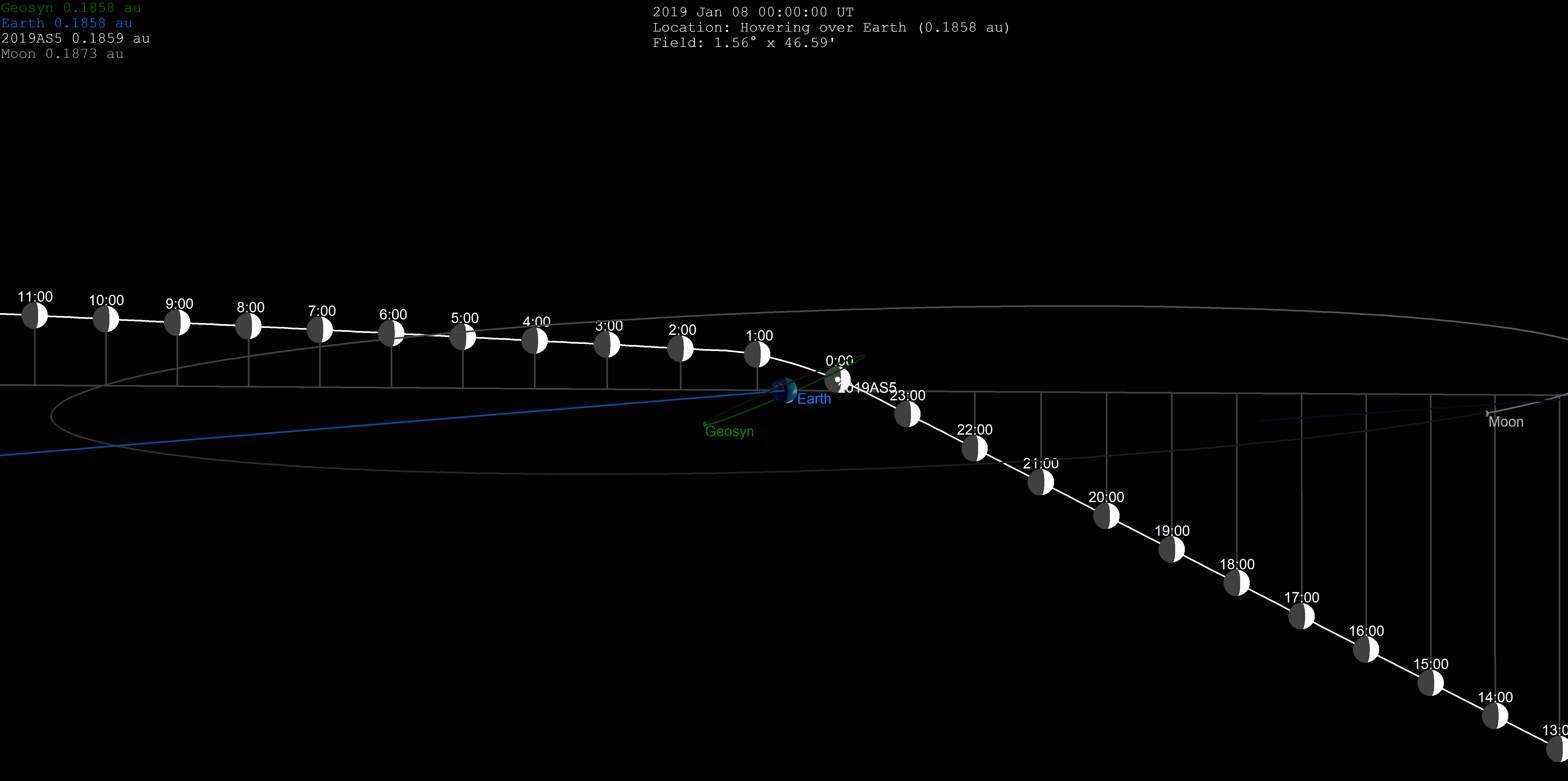
- The hourly motion of 2019 AS_{5} passed the Earth between 7 and 8 January 2019

Discovery
- Discovery site: Mount Lemmon Obs.
- Discovery date: 8 January 2019

Designations
- Minor planet category: NEO · Apollo

Orbital characteristics
- Epoch 27 April 2019 (JD 2458600.5)
- Uncertainty parameter 5
- Observation arc: 1 day
- Aphelion: 1.8769 AU
- Perihelion: 0.8188 AU
- Semi-major axis: 1.3478 AU
- Eccentricity: 0.3925
- Orbital period (sidereal): 1.56 yr (571.547 d)
- Mean anomaly: 98.81126°
- Mean motion: 0° 37^{m} 47.528^{s} / day
- Inclination: 0.7012968°
- Longitude of ascending node: 106.7463°
- Argument of perihelion: 294.359°
- Earth MOID: 0.000140 AU (0.054 LD)

Physical characteristics
- Mean diameter: 1–2 m (3.3–6.6 ft)
- Absolute magnitude (H): 32.243

2019 AS_{5} is a near-Earth asteroid that passed close by the Earth on 8 January 2019. It passed within 0.04 lunar distances or 15,000 kilometers of the center of the Earth, 8600 km from the surface. It was discovered by the Mt. Lemmon Survey 9 hours after closest approach. It is estimated to be about 1–2 metres (3–7 feet) in diameter.

As of July 2019, it is the closest approach of a non-impacting asteroid in 2019. 2019 MO impacted Earth on 22 June 2019.

== See also ==
- List of asteroid close approaches to Earth in 2019
