= 2019 BZ3 =

Very small near-Earth asteroid

2019 BZ_{3}
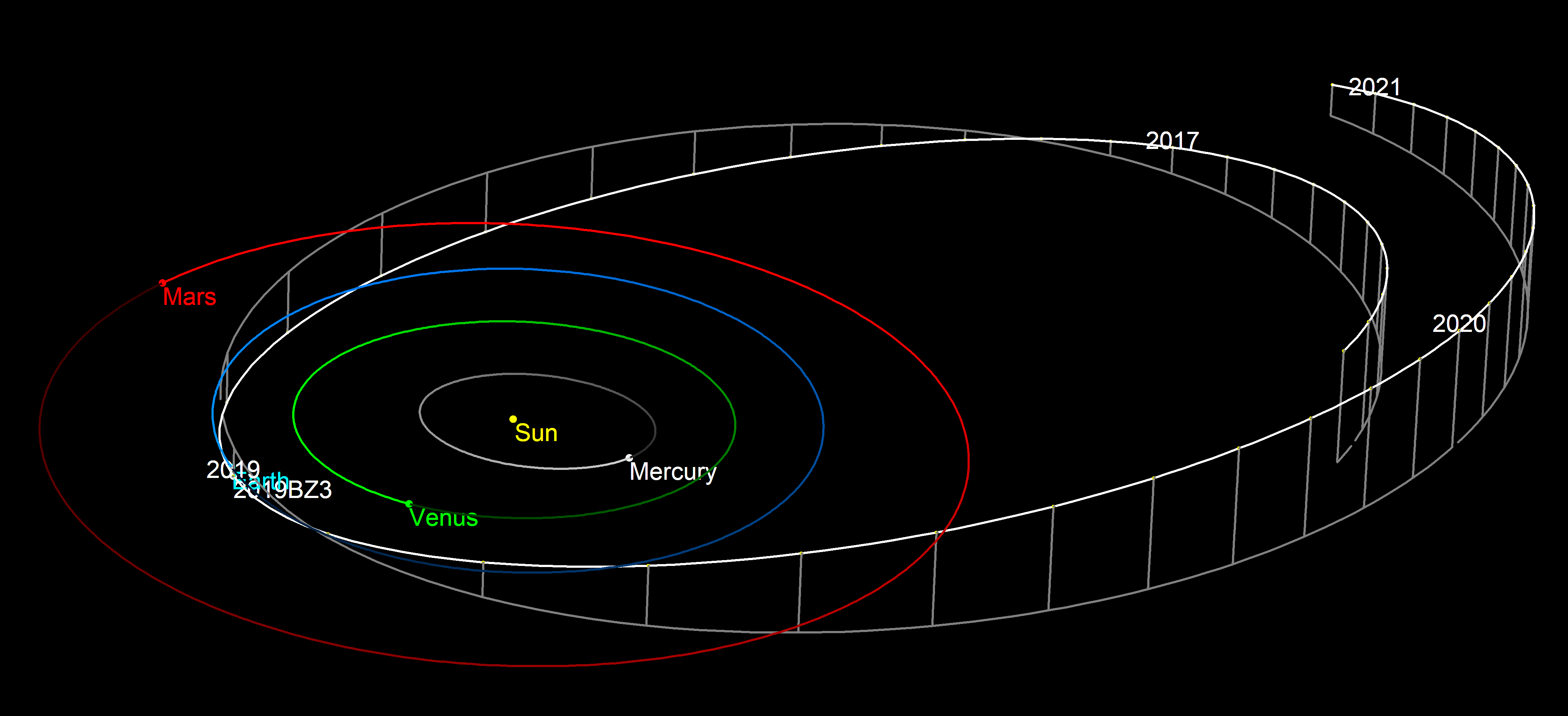
- Orbit of 2019 BZ_{3}, before and after 2019 flyby with 30 day motion

Discovery
- Discovered by: MLS
- Discovery site: Mount Lemmon Obs.
- Discovery date: 28 January 2019 (first observed only)

Designations
- Minor planet category: NEO · Apollo

Orbital characteristics
- Epoch 27 April 2019 (JD 2458600.5)
- Uncertainty parameter 7 · 5
- Observation arc: 8 days
- Aphelion: 3.6251 AU
- Perihelion: 0.9591 AU
- Semi-major axis: 2.2921 AU
- Eccentricity: 0.5815
- Orbital period (sidereal): 3.47 yr (1,268 d)
- Mean anomaly: 30.064°
- Mean motion: 0° 17^{m} 2.4^{s} / day
- Inclination: 10.631°
- Longitude of ascending node: 127.44°
- Argument of perihelion: 338.22°
- Earth MOID: 0.0004575 AU (0.18 LD)

Physical characteristics
- Mean diameter: 6 m (est. at 0.15)
- Apparent magnitude: 17.9 (brightest)
- Absolute magnitude (H): 28.8; 28.719

2019 BZ_{3} is a very small near-Earth asteroid of the Apollo group, approximately 6 meters (20 feet) in diameter. It was first observed by the Mount Lemmon Survey on 28 January 2019, just hours after the asteroid's sub-lunar flyby of Earth at less than 0.12 lunar distance.

== Orbit and classification ==
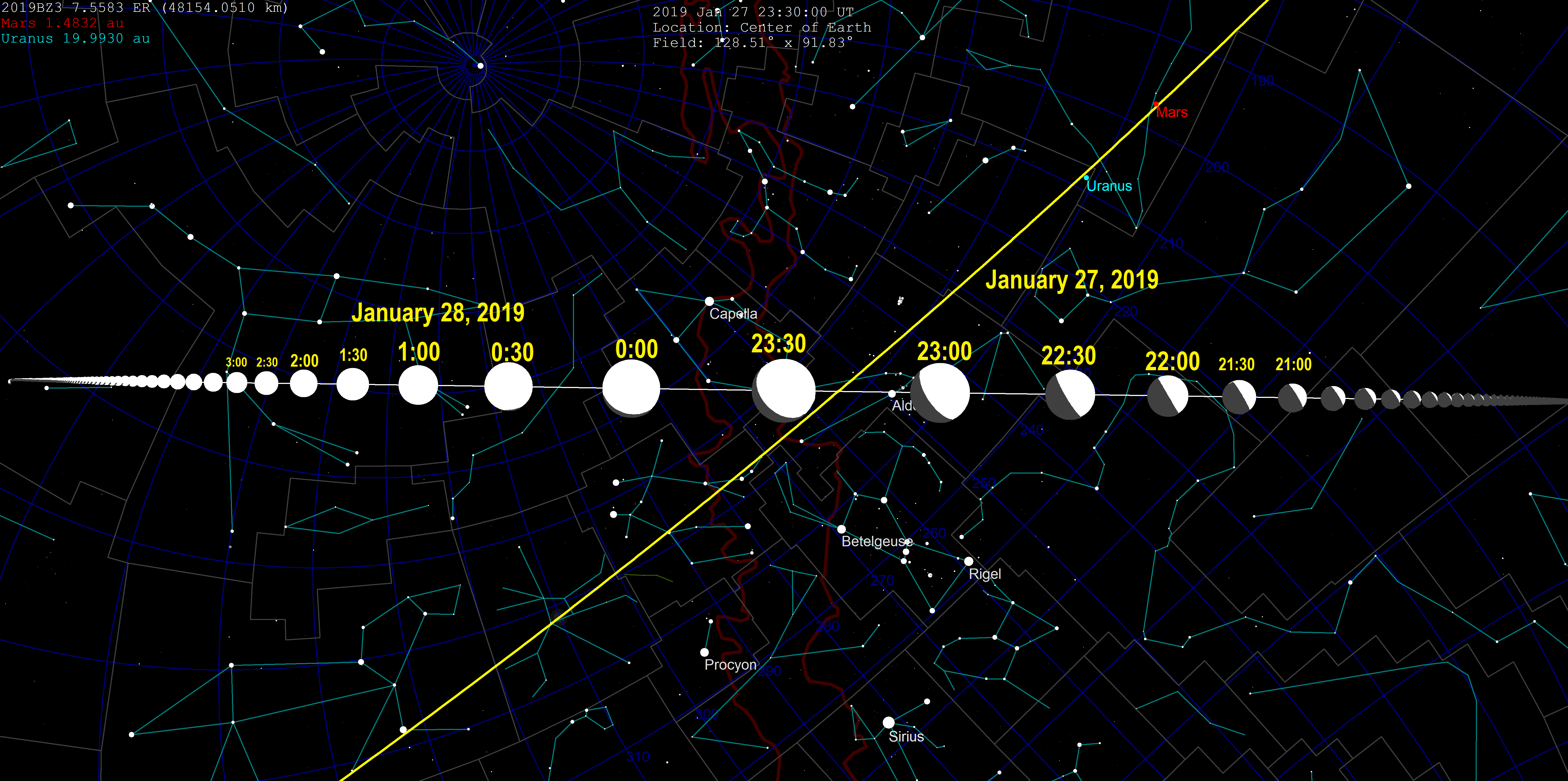
Path across sky, 30 minute motion

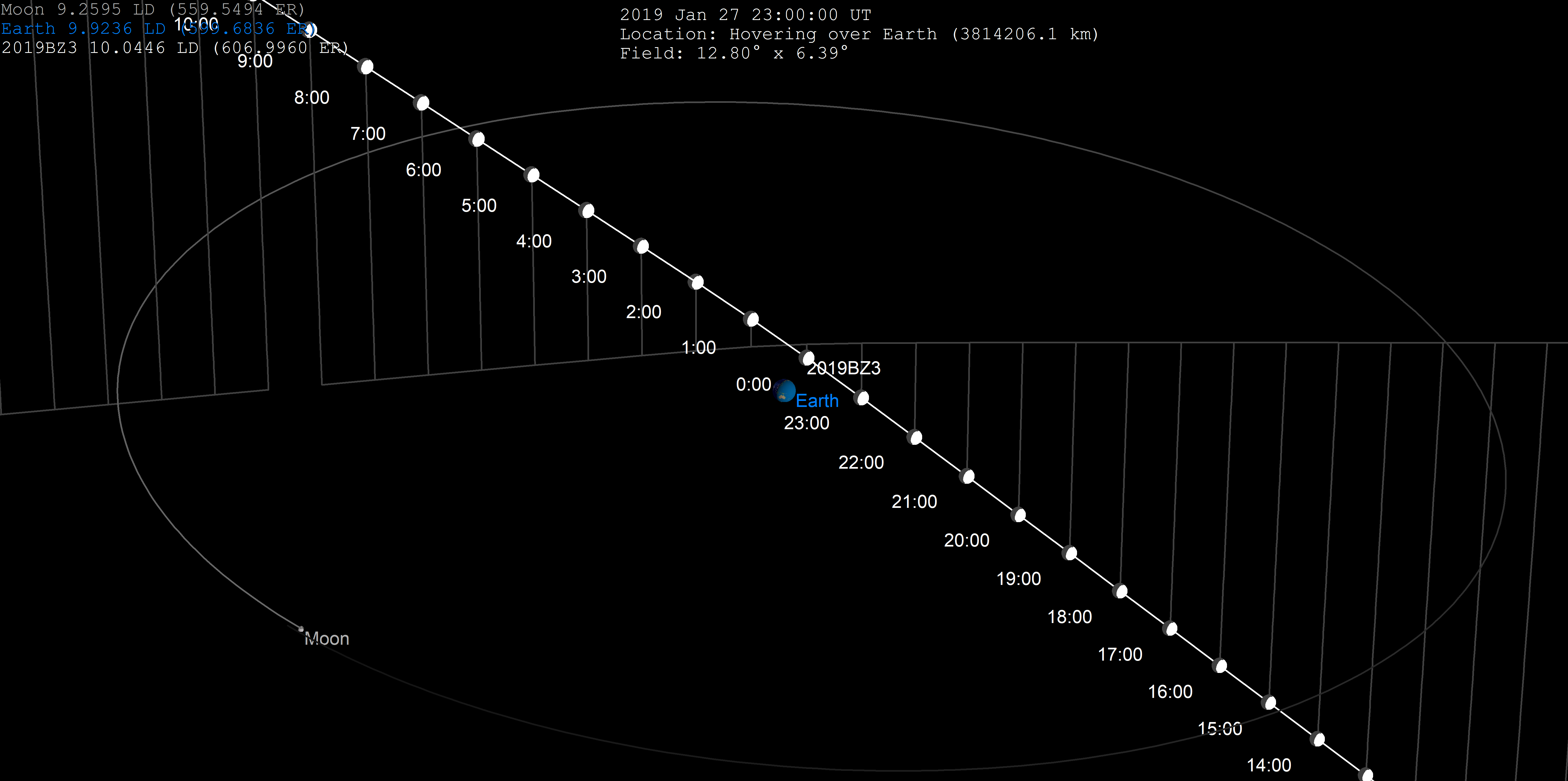
Hourly motion moon's orbit

2019 BZ_{3} is an Apollo asteroid, the largest subgroup of near-Earth objects. It orbits the Sun at a distance of 0.96–3.6 AU once every 3 years and 6 months (1,268 days; semi-major axis of 2.29 AU). Its orbit has a high eccentricity of 0.58 and an inclination of 11° with respect to the ecliptic. The body still has a high orbital uncertainty of 5 and 7, respectively. Its observation arc of only 8 days begins with its official first observation at Mount Lemmon Observatory on 28 January 2019.

=== Close approaches ===
2019 BZ_{3} has an Earth minimum orbital intersection distance of 0.000457 AU (68,000 km), which corresponds to 0.18 lunar distances (LD). Due to its very small size, however, 2019 BZ_{3} is not a potentially hazardous asteroid, which are required to be approximately 140 meters (460 ft) in diameter, that is, to be brighter than an absolute magnitude of 22.

Flybys

On 27 January 2019 at UTC 23:29, 2019 BZ_{3} passed Earth at a nominal distance of 48,130 km (0.125 LD) with a relative velocity of 11.37 km. Six hours later, it flew by the Moon at 350400 km. The object's next close approaches will occur on 17 December 2025 at a much greater distance of 56 LD (0.143 AU), and on 29 January 2085 at 5.5 LD (0.0142 AU).

== Numbering and naming ==
This minor planet has not yet been numbered by the Minor Planet Center and remains unnamed.

== Physical characteristics ==
2019 BZ_{3} has an undetermined spectral type. Based on a generic magnitude-to-diameter conversion, the asteroid measures approximately 6 meter in diameter for an assumed albedo of 0.15 and absolute magnitude 28.8. The estimated diameter may vary between 5 and 10 meters depending on whether an albedo for a dark carbonaceous (0.05) or a bright stony (0.25) asteroid is assumed.

== See also ==
- List of asteroid close approaches to Earth in 2019
