= 2019 BO =

Small near-Earth asteroid

Discovery
- Discovered by: CSS
- Discovery site: Mt. Lemmon Obs.
- Discovery date: 7 January 2019

Designations
- Minor planet category: NEO · Apollo

Orbital characteristics
- Epoch 27 April 2019 (JD 2458600.5)
- Uncertainty parameter 5
- Observation arc: 19 days
- Aphelion: 2.325 AU
- Perihelion: 0.9457236 AU
- Semi-major axis: 1.6356032 AU
- Eccentricity: 0.4217891
- Orbital period (sidereal): 2.09 yr (764.2 d)
- Mean anomaly: 58.82453°
- Mean motion: 0° 28^{m} 16.248^{s} / day
- Inclination: 2.78881°
- Longitude of ascending node: 295.63980°
- Argument of perihelion: 149.97352°
- Earth MOID: 0.00057 AU

Physical characteristics
- Mean diameter: 5–18 m (16–59 ft)
- Absolute magnitude (H): 28.1

2019 BO is a tiny near-Earth asteroid of the Apollo group. It was first observed by the Catalina Sky Survey at the Mount Lemmon Observatory on 7 January 2019. It passed within 0.18 lunar distances, or 69,192 kilometres (42,994 mi) from Earth.

== See also ==
- List of asteroid close approaches to Earth in 2019
