= 2019 BE5 =

Near-Earth asteroid

2019 BE_{5}
Discovery
- Discovered by: Zwicky Transient Facility
- Discovery site: Palomar Obs.
- Discovery date: 31 January 2019

Designations
- Minor planet category: NEO · Aten

Orbital characteristics
- Epoch 31 May 2020 (JD 2459000.5)
- Uncertainty parameter 2
- Observation arc: 0.99 yr (363 days)
- Aphelion: 1.012 AU
- Perihelion: 0.2079 AU
- Semi-major axis: 0.6101 AU
- Eccentricity: 0.65913
- Orbital period (sidereal): 0.48 yr (174.07 d)
- Mean anomaly: 75.347°
- Mean motion: 2° 4^{m} 5.473^{s} / day
- Inclination: 1.4363°
- Longitude of ascending node: 309.027°
- Argument of perihelion: 9.756°
- Earth MOID: 0.00001043 AU; 1,560 km (970 mi)
- Mercury MOID: 0.01246 AU
- Venus MOID: 0.00898 AU

Physical characteristics
- Mean diameter: 25–55 m (assumed albedo 0.05–0.25)
- Apparent magnitude: 24.4 (last observed); 15.0 (at discovery)
- Absolute magnitude (H): 25.10±0.48

2019 BE_{5} is a sub-kilometer near-Earth asteroid classified under the Aten group. It was discovered on 31 January 2019, by the Zwicky Transient Facility at the Palomar Observatory. The asteroid was discovered one day after it had made a close approach to Earth from a distance of 0.00784 AU (1.173 million km; 3.05 LD).

== Orbit and classification ==
2019 BE_{5} orbits the Sun at an average distance of approximately 0.61 astronomical units (0.0913×10^{9} km; 0.0567×10^{9} mi), taking 0.48 years or 174 days to complete one full orbit. It has an orbital eccentricity of 0.659 and a low inclination of 1.44 degrees to the ecliptic. The orbit of 2019 BE_{5} extends from 0.21 AU at perihelion to 1.01 AU at aphelion, crossing the orbits of Mercury, Venus, and Earth. As a result, it frequently makes close passes to these planets.

2019 BE_{5} is classified as an Aten asteroid, which means that it is an Earth-crossing asteroid that has an orbital semi-major axis less than 1 AU but an aphelion distance greater than Earth's perihelion distance of 0.983 AU. Its orbit has a very small minimum orbit intersection distance (MOID) with Earth, estimated to be approximately 0.00001043 AU (0.00406 LD), or 1,560 km (970 mi). Despite this small Earth MOID, a possible collision with Earth in the next 100 years has been ruled out by NASA's Sentry impact prediction system. With an absolute magnitude of 25.1, 2019 BE_{5} is too small to be classified as a potentially hazardous object.

=== Close approaches ===
On 30 January 2019, one day prior to its discovery, 2019 BE_{5} made a close pass by the Moon and Earth from within 0.01 AU (3.9 LD). The asteroid made its closest approach to the Moon from a distance of 0.00830 AU (1.242×10^{6} km; 3.23 LD) at 09:38 UTC, and then made its closest approach to Earth ten hours later, from a distance of 0.00784 AU (1.173×10^{6} km; 3.05 LD) at 19:36 UTC.

== Physical characteristics ==
Given an absolute magnitude of 25.1 and an assumed geometric albedo of 0.05–0.25, 2019 BE_{5} is estimated to have a diameter between 25–55 metres (0.016–0.034 mi).

== See also ==
- List of asteroid close approaches to Earth in 2019
