= (12538) 1998 OH =

Near-earth Apollo asteroid

Discovery
- Discovered by: NEAT
- Discovery site: Haleakala Obs.
- Discovery date: 19 July 1998

Designations
- Minor planet category: NEO · Apollo · PHA

Orbital characteristics
- Epoch 4 September 2017 (JD 2458000.5)
- Uncertainty parameter 0
- Observation arc: 25.96 yr (9,483 days)
- Aphelion: 2.1674 AU
- Perihelion: 0.9155 AU
- Semi-major axis: 1.5414 AU
- Eccentricity: 0.4061
- Orbital period (sidereal): 1.91 yr (699 days)
- Mean anomaly: 58.305°
- Mean motion: 0° 30^{m} 54^{s} / day
- Inclination: 24.529°
- Longitude of ascending node: 220.75°
- Argument of perihelion: 321.72°
- Earth MOID: 0.0280 AU · 10.9 LD

Physical characteristics
- Dimensions: 1.663±0.329 km 2.06 km (calculated)
- Synodic rotation period: 2.58±0.001 h 2.582±0.001 h 5.088±0.004 h 5.154 h 5.191±0.002 h 5.833±0.005 h
- Geometric albedo: 0.20 (assumed); 0.232±0.116
- Spectral type: SMASS = S: · S
- Absolute magnitude (H): 15.8 · 16.1

(12538) 1998 OH is a stony asteroid, classified as a near-Earth object and potentially hazardous asteroid of the Apollo group, approximately 1.8 kilometers (1.1 mi) in diameter. It was discovered on 19 July 1998, by astronomers of the Near-Earth Asteroid Tracking program at the Haleakala Observatory in Hawaii, United States. This minor planet was numbered by the Minor Planet Center on 23 November 1999. As of 2018, it has not been named. In 2019, the asteroid came within about 73 lunar distances of Earth.

== Orbit and classification ==
1998 OH is a member of the Apollo group of asteroids, which are Earth-crossing asteroids. They are the largest group of near-Earth objects with approximately 10,000 known members.

It orbits the Sun at a distance of 0.9–2.2 AU in 1 year and 11 months (699 days). Its orbit has an eccentricity of 0.41 and an inclination of 25° with respect to the ecliptic. The body's observation arc begins with a precovery taken at Palomar Observatory in October 1991, more than 7 years prior to its official discovery observation at Haleakala.

The asteroid has an Earth minimum orbital intersection distance of 0.0280 AU (4.19 million km; 2.60 million mi), which corresponds to 10.9 lunar distances and makes it a potentially hazardous asteroid due to its sufficiently large size. It will pass close to Earth in 2042 and 2132, at distances of 0.0292 AU and 0.0317 AU, respectively.

== Physical characteristics ==
In the SMASS classification, 1998 OH is a common stony S-type asteroid.

In 2014, several rotational lightcurves of 1998 OH were obtained from photometric observations by American astronomer Brian Warner at the Palmer Divide Station in California, by the Spanish amateur astronomer group OBAS, and by astronomers of the EURONEAR lightcurve NEO survey. Lightcurve analysis gave a rotation period of 5.154 hours with an alternative period solution of 2.58 hours, or half the period. The asteroid's brightness amplitude is rather low with a maximum between 0.11 and 0.20 magnitude, which is indicative for a spherical rather than elongated shape (U=3/3/2-/3/2/2). (Note: Lightcurve plot of (12538) by Brian Warner (2014) at the Center for Solar System Studies (CS3), with rotation period 5.833±0.005 hours with a brightness amplitude of 0.12±0.02 mag. Quality Code of 2. Summary figures for (12538) at LCDB) (Note: Lightcurve plot of (12538) by Brian Warner (2016) at the Center for Solar System Studies (CS3), with rotation period 5.154±0.002 hours with a brightness amplitude of 0.20 mag. Quality Code of 3. Summary figures for (12538) at LCDB)

According to the survey carried out by the NEOWISE mission of NASA's Wide-field Infrared Survey Explorer, 1998 OH measures 1.663 kilometers in diameter and its surface has an albedo of 0.232. The Collaborative Asteroid Lightcurve Link assumes a standard albedo for stony asteroids of 0.20 and calculates a diameter of 2.06 kilometers based on an absolute magnitude of 15.8.

== See also ==
- List of asteroid close approaches to Earth in 2019
