= 2020 LD =

Near-Earth asteroid

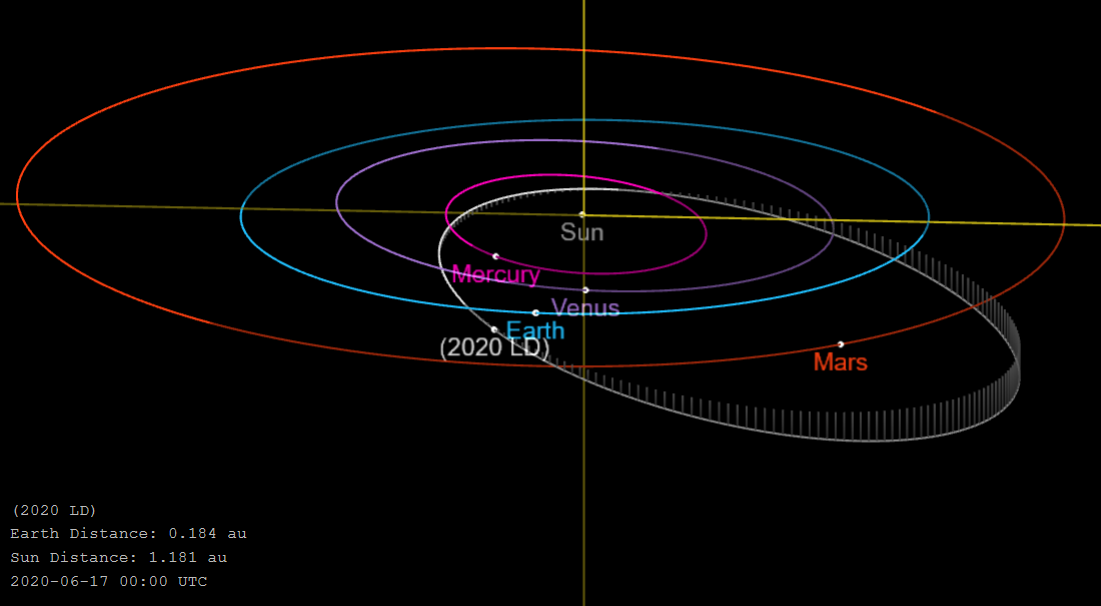
- Orbital diagram of 2020 LD. It crosses the orbit of all four inner planets of the Solar System.

Discovery
- Discovered by: ATLAS–MLO (T08)
- Discovery date: 7 June 2020

Designations
- Minor planet category: NEO · Apollo

Orbital characteristics
- Epoch 2025-Nov-21 (JD 2461000.5)
- Uncertainty parameter 1
- Observation arc: 8.08 years (2950 days)
- Aphelion: 2.194 AU
- Perihelion: 0.243 AU
- Semi-major axis: 1.219 AU
- Eccentricity: 0.8003
- Orbital period (sidereal): 1.35 yr
- Mean anomaly: 51.9°
- Inclination: 3.43°
- Longitude of ascending node: 73.21°
- Argument of perihelion: 46.39°
- Earth MOID: 0.0017 AU (250 thousand km)
- Mercury MOID: 0.00015 AU (22 thousand km)
- Venus MOID: 0.00024 AU (36 thousand km)
- Mars MOID: 0.00494 AU (739 thousand km)
- Jupiter MOID: 2.919 AU (436.7 million km)

Physical characteristics
- Mean diameter: 89–200 m (CNEOS); ~140 m (460 ft)
- Absolute magnitude (H): 22.4±0.2

2020 LD is an Apollo near-Earth asteroid roughly 140 meters (460 feet) in diameter. It was discovered on 7 June 2020 when the asteroid was about 0.03 AU (4.5 million km; 12 LD) from Earth and had a solar elongation of 154 degrees. The glare of the Sun had masked the approach of the asteroid since November 2019. (Note: The asteroid was within 60 degrees of the Sun from 8 November 2019 until 5 June 2020 07:27 UT.) The asteroid passed closest approach to Earth on 5 June 2020 at a distance of 0.002 AU (300 thousand km; 0.78 LD). The close approach distance is now known with an accuracy of roughly ± 50 km. This is the largest asteroid to pass closer than the Moon in 2020 and possibly the largest since (308635) 2005 YU55 in November 2011. (Note: Given a generic size estimate of 84–190 meters for 2018 AH, we can not be certain that 2020 LD at a generic estimate of 89–200 meters is larger. Knowing a more precise size requires knowing the albedo (how reflective the surface is.) The albedo combined with the absolute magnitude (H) can help determine the size of an asteroid.) (Note: The diameter of most newly discovered near-Earth asteroids can generally only be estimated within about a factor of 2 based on the asteroid's absolute magnitude (H). Based on this, the only larger asteroids that passed less than 1 lunar distance from the Earth are: (458732) 2011 MD5, (163132) 2002 CU11, (152680) 1998 KJ9, 2017 VW13, 2002 JE9, 2012 TY_{52}, (308635) 2005 YU55) The asteroid makes close approaches to Mercury, Venus, Earth, and Mars. It will be brighter than apparent magnitude 24 until 18 July 2020.

When it had a short 6 day observation arc, it was possible that the asteroid could have passed 0.00008 AU (12 thousand km; 0.031 LD) from Earth in June 1918 or would have passed 0.0001 AU (15 thousand km) from Venus in April 2024.

With a 11-day observation arc, the Sentry Risk Table listed a 1 in 9 million chance of impact on 7 June 2109, prior to the asteroid's removal from the list on 21 May 2021.

(501647) 2014 SD224 is another similarly sized asteroid whose close approach was not masked by the Sun in 2020.

== Recent 100m asteroids passing within lunar distance ==
Very few asteroids have known sizes or shapes. The albedo (how reflective the surface is) of these asteroids is often unknown and therefore only generic assumptions can be made about their sizes. A smaller more reflective asteroid can have the same absolute magnitude (H) of a larger less reflective asteroid.

Asteroids in the size range of "2020 LD" (H<24) that passed inside 1 lunar distance from Dec 2011 – June 2020
| Asteroid | Date | Earth distance | H | JPL CNEOS generic diameter (meters) |
|---|---|---|---|---|
| 2020 LD | 2020-06-05 | 0.00205 AU (307 thousand km; 0.80 LD) | 22.4 | 89 – 200 |
| 2019 OK | 2019-07-25 | 0.00048 AU (72 thousand km; 0.19 LD) | 23.3 | 58 – 130 |
| 2019 OD | 2019-07-24 | 0.00239 AU (358 thousand km; 0.93 LD) | 23.4 | 56 – 120 |
| 2010 WC9 | 2018-05-15 | 0.00136 AU (203 thousand km; 0.53 LD) | 23.6 | 51 – 110 |
| 2018 GE3 | 2018-04-15 | 0.00129 AU (193 thousand km; 0.50 LD) | 23.8 | 46 – 100 |
| 2018 AH | 2018-01-02 | 0.00199 AU (298 thousand km; 0.77 LD) | 22.5 | 84 – 190 |
| 2011 XC2 | 2011-12-03 | 0.00232 AU (347 thousand km; 0.90 LD) | 23.2 | 61 – 140 |

== See also ==
- 2019 OK
- 2018 AH
