= 2006 QQ23 =

Sub-kilometre asteroid

2006 QQ_{23}
Discovery
- Discovered by: SSS
- Discovery site: Siding Spring Obs.
- Discovery date: 21 August 2006 (first observed)

Designations
- Minor planet category: Aten · NEO · PHA

Orbital characteristics
- Epoch 21 November 2025 (JD 2461000.5)
- Uncertainty parameter 0
- Observation arc: 17.95 yr (6,555 d)
- Aphelion: 1.0321 au
- Perihelion: 0.5753 au
- Semi-major axis: 0.8037 au
- Eccentricity: 0.2842
- Orbital period (sidereal): 263 d
- Mean anomaly: 90.503°
- Mean motion: 1° 22^{m} 4.8^{s} / day
- Inclination: 3.4494°
- Longitude of ascending node: 4.0683°
- Argument of perihelion: 125.54°
- Earth MOID: 0.0334 au (13.0 LD)
- Mercury MOID: 0.2323 au
- Venus MOID: 0.0507 au
- Mars MOID: 0.3590 au

Physical characteristics
- Mean diameter: 250 m (est. at 0.26); 570 m (est. at 0.05)
- Absolute magnitude (H): 19.71

2006 QQ_{23} (Note: The name 2006 QQ_{23} is its provisional designation which is based on the date it was discovered: 2006 for the year, "Q" for half-month of August 16–31, and "Q_{23}" for the 17th discovery in the 23rd reiteration of the alphabet (excluding "I"), making it the 592nd object discovered in the second half of August 2006.) is a sub-kilometre asteroid, classified as a near-Earth object of the Aten group that is potentially hazardous only as the orbit evolves over millennia. It was first observed on 21 August 2006 by the Siding Spring Survey. On 10 August 2019, the object safely passed 7.4 million kilometres (4.6 million miles) from Earth. With a nearly 18-year observation arc it has a well determined orbit and is not a threat for the foreseeable future.

== Discovery ==
2006 QQ_{23} was first observed on 21 August 2006 by the Siding Spring Survey, at the Siding Spring Observatory in Australia.

== Orbit and classification ==
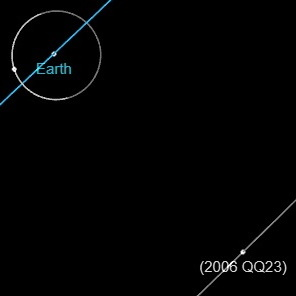
2019 flyby of 2006 QQ_{23} at 13.2 lunar distances.

2006 QQ_{23} is classified as an Aten asteroid, which means that it is a near-Earth asteroid that crosses Earth's orbit at two points and has an orbital period of less than a year. Because it will come within 0.05 au of the Earth (MOID) and has an absolute magnitude (H) brighter than 22, 2006 QQ_{23} is labelled as a potentially hazardous object. With a nearly 18-year observation arc it has a well determined orbit and is not a threat for the foreseeable future.

It orbits the Sun at a distance of 0.57–1.03 au in less than 9 months (263 days; semi-major axis of 0.80 au). Its orbit has an eccentricity of 0.28 and an inclination of 3.4° with respect to the ecliptic. The body's observation arc begins with its first observation at the Siding Spring Observatory on 21 August 2006.

=== Close approach in 2019 ===
On 10 August 2019 at 7:23 am UTC, 2006 QQ_{23} safely passed 0.04977 au (7,445,000 km) from Earth; travelling at around 4.67 km/s (16,800 km/h) The asteroid was recovered on 14 July 2019, which extended the observation arc from 8 years to 12 years, and therefore it had a very small uncertainty in the 2019 approach. The uncertainty region in the close approach was ±60 km. (Note: Archive of JPL 19 (2019-08-06 solution) using 2019-08-10 close approach data: (max distance: 0.04977 − min distance: 0.0497692) × 149597870.7 km = 119.6 km.)

== Physical characteristics ==
Based on its absolute magnitude of 19.71, 2006 QQ_{23} is estimated to have a diameter of 250–570 metres using an assumed albedo between 0.05 (carbonaceous) and 0.26 (siliceous).
