= 2014 LY21 =

Near-Earth asteroid

2014 LY_{21}
Discovery
- Discovered by: Mount Lemmon Srvy.
- Discovery date: 2 June 2014

Designations
- Minor planet category: Aten; NEO

Orbital characteristics
- Epoch 2 June 2014 (JD 2456810.5)
- Uncertainty parameter 9
- Observation arc: ~1 hour (Note: Observation arc: (02.46118 – 02.41612) * 24 hours * 60 minutes = 65 minutes)
- Aphelion: 1.0306 AU (154.18 Gm) (Q)
- Perihelion: 0.35603 AU (53.261 Gm) (q)
- Semi-major axis: 0.69330 AU (103.716 Gm) (a)
- Eccentricity: 0.48647 (e)
- Orbital period (sidereal): 0.58 yr (210.9 d)
- Mean anomaly: 203.00° (M)
- Mean motion: 1.7074°/day (n)
- Inclination: 0.80341° (i)
- Longitude of ascending node: 73.788° (Ω)
- Argument of perihelion: 348.77° (ω)
- Earth MOID: 0.000140028 AU (20,947.9 km)
- Jupiter MOID: 4.29318 AU (642.251 Gm)

Physical characteristics
- Dimensions: 4–8 m (13–26 ft)
- Absolute magnitude (H): 29.1

2014 LY_{21} is a near-Earth asteroid of the Aten group, approximately 4–8 meters (13–26 feet) in diameter. On 3 June 2014 around 17:38 UT (± 3 hours), it is crudely estimated to have passed about 0.00013 AU (19,000 km) from Earth. (Note: The asteroid passed about 20000±40000 km from the center of Earth and Earth has a radius of 6371 km.) The asteroid was discovered on 2 June 2014 by the Mount Lemmon Survey at an apparent magnitude of 21 using a 1.5-meter (59 in) reflecting telescope.

== Uncertainty ==
With an observation arc of about 1 hour, the trajectory is poorly constrained and the asteroid has an uncertainty parameter of 9 making long-term predictions of the asteroids position nearly impossible. The nominal (best fit) orbit shows that 2014 LY_{21} passed 0.00013 AU (19,000 km; 12,000 mi) from Earth on 3 June 2014 (~12,700 km from Earth's surface). But the uncertainty region shows that the asteroid could have approached Earth as close as 0.00006 AU (9,000 km; 5,600 mi) or as far as 0.0005 AU (75,000 km; 46,000 mi). Since Earth has a radius of approximately 6,400 km, the asteroid did not come any closer than about 2,600 km from Earth's surface.

=== Moon ===
The nominal orbit shows that 2014 LY_{21} passed 0.001 AU (150,000 km; 93,000 mi) from the Moon on 4 June 2014. But the uncertainty region shows that the asteroid could have impacted the Moon or passed as far as 0.007 AU (1,000,000 km; 650,000 mi). But it is very unlikely that the asteroid impacted the Moon.

== See also ==
- 2004 FU162
- 2020 QG
