= 2019 GC6 =

Near-Earth asteroid

2019 GC_{6}
Discovery
- Discovered by: CSS
- Discovery site: Catalina Stn.
- Discovery date: 9 April 2019

Designations
- Minor planet category: NEO · Apollo

Orbital characteristics
- Epoch 27 April 2019 (JD 2458600.5)
- Uncertainty parameter 5 · 4
- Observation arc: 17 days
- Aphelion: 1.2985 AU
- Perihelion: 0.9104 AU
- Semi-major axis: 1.1045 AU
- Eccentricity: 0.1757
- Orbital period (sidereal): 1.16 yr (424 d)
- Mean anomaly: 317.32°
- Mean motion: 0° 50^{m} 56.76^{s} / day
- Inclination: 1.2557°
- Longitude of ascending node: 211.61°
- Argument of perihelion: 63.845°
- Earth MOID: 0.0015 AU (0.5844 LD)

Physical characteristics
- Mean diameter: 15 m (est. at 0.20); 28 m (est. at 0.057)
- Absolute magnitude (H): 26.5; 26.51

2019 GC_{6} is a very small near-Earth asteroid and potentially hazardous object of the Apollo group, approximately 20 meters (70 ft) in diameter. It was detected by the Catalina Sky Survey at Catalina Station on 9 April 2019, a few days before it made its first-observed pass through the cislunar region at a distance of 136,000 miles (219,000 km), comparable to roughly half the average distance from the Earth to the Moon (0.58 LD).

== Orbit and classification ==
2019 GC_{6} is a member of the Apollo group of asteroids, which are Earth-crossing asteroids. They are the largest group of near-Earth objects with approximately 10,000 known members. It orbits the Sun at a distance of 0.91–1.29 AU once every 14 months (424 days; semi-major axis of 1.1 AU). Its orbit has an eccentricity of 0.18 and an inclination of 1° with respect to the ecliptic.

The body's observation arc begins with its first observation by the Mount Lemmon Survey on 31 March 2019, just a few days prior to its potential discovery observation by the Catalina Sky Survey.

== Physical characteristics ==
=== Diameter and albedo ===
The dimensions of the asteroid are estimated to range between 7.5–30 metres (25–98 ft) and has been compared to size of a house. Based on a magnitude-to-diameter conversion and a measured absolute magnitude of 26.5, 2019 GC_{6} measures between 15 and 28 meters in diameter for an assumed geometric albedo of 0.20 (siliceous) and 0.057 (carbonaceous), respectively.
