= 2016 AZ8 =

Sub-kilometer asteroid and near-Earth object

2016 AZ_{8}
- Radar images of 2016 AZ_{8} and its satellite by the Arecibo Observatory in January 2019

Discovery
- Discovered by: WISE
- Discovery site: Earth orbit
- Discovery date: 3 January 2016

Designations
- Minor planet category: NEO · Apollo; PHA

Orbital characteristics
- Epoch 27 April 2019 (JD 2458600.5)
- Uncertainty parameter 0
- Observation arc: 3.69 yr (1,347 d)
- Aphelion: 1.7895 AU
- Perihelion: 0.8516 AU
- Semi-major axis: 1.3205 AU
- Eccentricity: 0.3551
- Orbital period (sidereal): 1.52 yr (554 d)
- Mean anomaly: 99.623°
- Mean motion: 0° 38^{m} 58.2^{s} / day
- Inclination: 5.5862°
- Longitude of ascending node: 90.016°
- Argument of perihelion: 318.51°
- Known satellites: 1
- Earth MOID: 0.0295 AU (11.49 LD)

Physical characteristics
- Mean diameter: 215±52 m
- Absolute magnitude (H): 21.0

2016 AZ_{8} is a sub-kilometer asteroid and near-Earth object of the Apollo group, at least 400 meters (1,300 feet) in diameter. It was first observed on 3 January 2016, by the WISE telescope with precovery images found back in 2012.

The potentially hazardous asteroid is a binary system with a minor-planet moon in its orbit. The discovery was made by astronomers at Arecibo Observatory on 4 January 2019, while 2016 AZ_{8} was passing within 4,460,000 kilometers (0.0298 AU) of the Earth. The binary has a secondary-to-primary diameter ratio of at least 0.3.

== Orbit and classification ==
2016 AZ_{8} orbits the Sun at a distance of 0.85–1.8 AU once every 18 months (554 days; semi-major axis of 1.32 AU). Its orbit has an eccentricity of 0.36 and an inclination of 6° with respect to the ecliptic. The body's observation arc begins with a precovery taken at the Siding Spring Survey in July 2012, more than three years prior to its official discovery observation.
