= 2019 PG1 =

Near-Earth asteroid

2019 PG_{1}
Discovery
- Discovered by: Pan-STARRS
- Discovery site: Haleakala Obs.
- Discovery date: 8 August 2019

Designations
- Minor planet category: NEO–Apollo; PHA

Orbital characteristics
- Epoch 31 May 2020 (JD 2459000.5)
- Uncertainty parameter 5 · 4
- Observation arc: 103 days
- Aphelion: 3.9153 AU
- Perihelion: 0.9988 AU
- Semi-major axis: 2.4571 AU
- Eccentricity: 0.5935
- Orbital period (sidereal): 3.85 yr (1,407 d)
- Mean anomaly: 79.450°
- Mean motion: 0° 15^{m} 21.24^{s} / day
- Inclination: 20.352°
- Longitude of ascending node: 281.64°
- Argument of perihelion: 13.559°
- Earth MOID: 0.00697 AU (2.71 LD)

Physical characteristics
- Mean diameter: 270 m (est. at 0.14); 200–450 meters (CNEOS)
- Absolute magnitude (H): 20.6

2019 PG_{1} is a sub-kilometer near-Earth object and potentially hazardous asteroid of the Apollo class, discovered by Pan-STARRS on 8 August 2019, two weeks after it passed Earth at 62 LD. With an observation arc of 103 days, Earth approach dates become divergent by 2042 as the date of closest approach in 2042 has an uncertainty of ±3 days.

== Orbit and classification ==
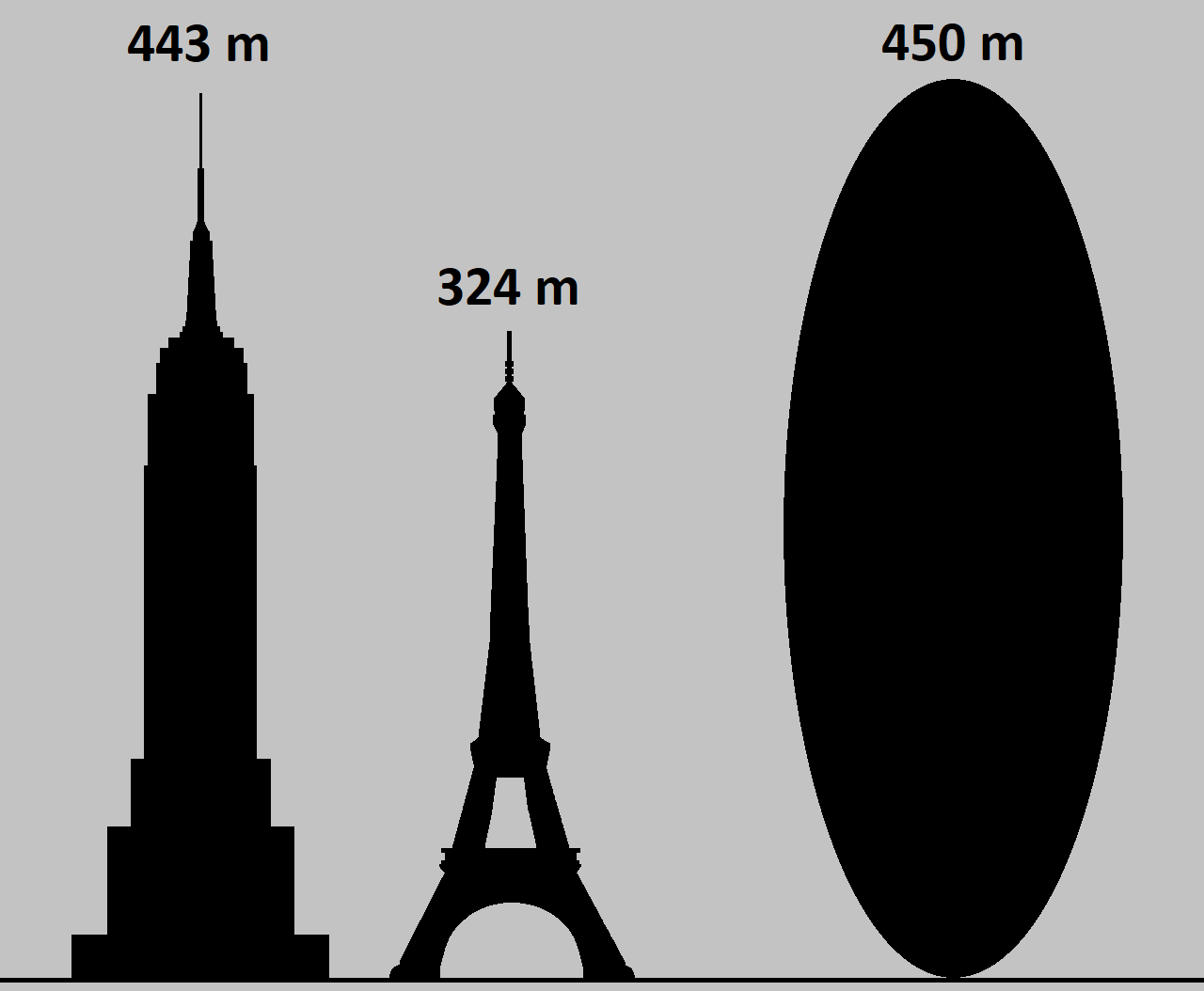
2019 PG_{1} has an estimated mean diameter of 200–450 meters, similar to the height of the Eiffel Tower.

2019 PG_{1} belongs to the Apollo asteroids, which cross the orbit of Earth. Apollos are the largest group of near-Earth objects with about 10 thousand known members. It orbits the Sun at a distance of 0.999–3.92 AU once every 3 years and 10 months (1,407 days; semi-major axis of 2.46 AU). Its orbit has an eccentricity of 0.59 and an inclination of 20° with respect to the ecliptic. With an uncertainty parameter of 4 and 5, respectively, long term predictions of the object's trajectory are imprecise.

2019 PG_{1} is also a potentially hazardous asteroid (PHA) because its minimum orbit intersection distance (MOID) is less than 0.05 AU and its diameter is greater than 150 meters. The Earth-MOID is 0.00697 AU (2.71 LD; 1,043,000 km; 648,000 mi).

=== Close approaches ===
In July 1988, 2019 PG_{1} made an Earth flyby of between 12–23 lunar distances (0.03–0.06 AU). On 24 July 2019, two weeks before its official discovery observation by Pan-STARRS, it passed Earth at 62 lunar distances (0.1581 AU). In June 2065 it should pass within 39 lunar distances (0.1 AU). In July 2111 a possibly notable close-approach to Earth may occur, but the asteroid is expected to pass 16 lunar distances (0.04 AU) from Earth and has an uncertainty region of about ±15 million km. (Note: The JPL Small-Body Database shows a linear minimum possible distance of 0.0000012 AU (180 km) from the center of Earth, which would be inside of the 6,371 km radius of Earth. It is not listed on the more thorough Sentry Risk Table because Sentry accounts for orbit propagation nonlinearites along the line of variations.) The asteroid is not listed on the Sentry Risk Table as the nonlinearities along the line of variations do not intersect where Earth will be.

== Diameter and albedo ==
According to NASA's Center for Near-Earth Object Studies, it has a mean-diameter of 270 meters (890 feet), based on an absolute magnitude of 20.6 and an assumed albedo of 0.14. Based on its brightness and the way it reflects light, the object's diameter may vary as much as 200–450 meters, depending on whether its surface is of a stony or a carbonaceous composition, which correspond to an albedo of 0.25 and 0.05, respectively.

It has been estimated that asteroids of similar size such as 99942 Apophis could produce up to 10 million casualties if they hit populated areas.
