= 2019 OK =

Near-Earth asteroid

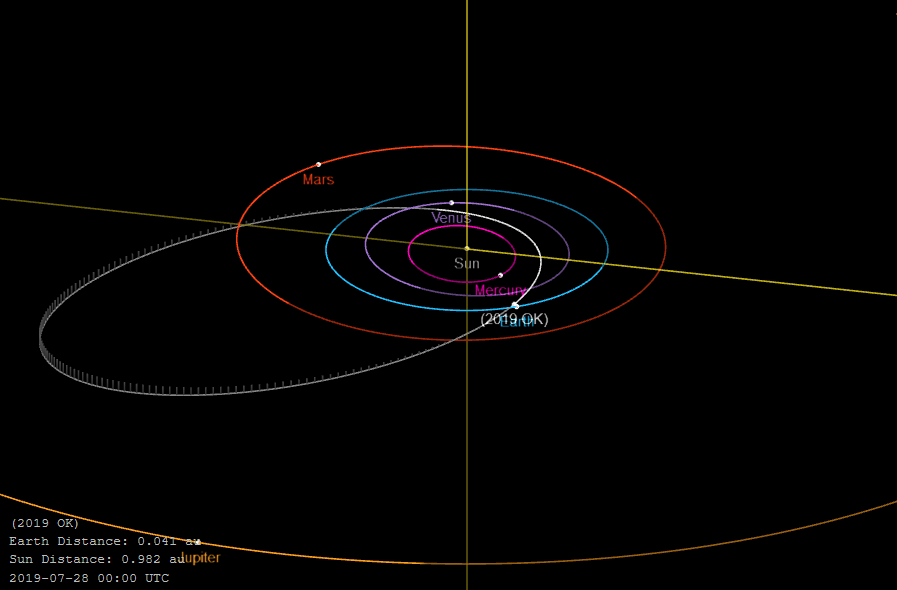
- 2019 OK orbits near the ecliptic plane out to the asteroid belt and inside the orbit of Venus

Discovery
- Discovered by: SONEAR Obs.
- Discovery site: SONEAR Obs. (Y00)
- Discovery date: 24 July 2019

Designations
- Alternative designations: NEOCP S511618
- Minor planet category: Apollo · NEO

Orbital characteristics
- Epoch 27 April 2019 (JD 2458600.5)
- Uncertainty parameter 1
- Observation arc: 2.42 years
- Earliest precovery date: 2017-02-21 (Pan-STARRS)
- Aphelion: 3.4315 AU
- Perihelion: 0.4635 AU
- Semi-major axis: 1.9475 AU
- Eccentricity: 0.7620
- Orbital period (sidereal): 2.72 yr (993 d)
- Mean anomaly: 310.58°
- Mean motion: 0° 21^{m} 45.36^{s} / day
- Inclination: 1.4006°
- Longitude of ascending node: 302.27°
- Argument of perihelion: 104.24°
- Earth MOID: 0.00036 AU (54,000 km) (0.14 LD)

Physical characteristics
- Mean diameter: 57–130 m (187–426 ft)
- Absolute magnitude (H): 23.3±0.3; 23.3

2019 OK (see provisional designation) is a near-Earth asteroid noted for its sudden, surprise discovery on the day before it flew by at approximately 70,000 km (43,000 mi) in 2019. The object's size is estimated at 57 to 130 metres (187 to 426 ft) across, the closest asteroid of such size discovered in 2019. It is uncommon for asteroids of this moderately large size to pass within 100,000 km (62,000 mi) of Earth.

== Discovery ==
The first detection made public occurred on 24 July 2019, when it was 0.01 AU (1,500,000 km; 930,000 mi) from Earth and had an apparent magnitude of 14.7. The full moon on 16 July 2019 slowed down the asteroid discovery rate during mid-July. The asteroid was detected by Cristóvão Jacques, Eduardo Pimentel and João Ribeiro at the private SONEAR Observatory in Oliveira, Minas Gerais when it was very close to opposition (opposite the Sun in the sky) with a solar elongation of 170 degrees. About 10 hours later it was independently detected by ASAS-SN project in images from two of its telescopes, which allowed a preliminary determination of its orbit. It was subsequently listed on the Minor Planet Center's Near-Earth Object Confirmation Page (NEOCP) as S511618. The listing was confirmed and publicly announced as 2019 OK with three hours remaining before the 25 July 2019 closest approach.

Various circumstances prevented an earlier discovery, despite the efforts to continuously hunt for such objects. The last previous appearance was not lost in the glare of the Sun, but was not favorable to survey instruments located in the Northern Hemisphere, due to its celestial direction in the Southern constellation Capricornus and close to the bright moon. The Pan-STARRS1 telescope did record an image of 2019 OK on 28 June 2019 when it was 0.39 AU (58,000,000 km; 36,000,000 mi) from Earth and had an apparent magnitude of 22.9. Automatic analysis missed detecting the object in the Pan-STARRS image because the object was too faint. The Pan-STARRS1 telescope again saw the object on 7 July 2019 when the object was brighter with magnitude 21.2. However, it was at that time moving directly towards the observer and its apparent motion across the sky was extremely slow, with a rate of 0.01 degrees/day, and it was not recognized as a moving object.

== Orbit and classification ==
The asteroid is a member of the Flora family (402), a populous asteroid family and the largest family of stony asteroids in the main-belt. It orbits the Sun in the inner main-belt at a distance of 0.5–3.4 AU once every 2 years and 9 months (993 days; semi-major axis of 1.95 AU). Its orbit has an eccentricity of 0.76 and an inclination of 1° with respect to the ecliptic. After evaluating its orbit, the asteroid was identified as the most probable parent body of the particles responsible for the meteor shower designated, 17 Capricornids (SCP #1042).

== 2019 flyby ==
On 25 July 2019 at 01:22 UTC it had its closest approach to Earth, when it passed about 0.00047697 AU (71,354 km; 44,337 mi)—less than one-fifth of the distance to the Moon. Its speed was nearly 88,500 kilometres (55,000 mi) per hour.

Animation of 2019 OK's orbit

Around the Sun

Around the Earth

2019 OK · Sun · Mercury · Venus · Earth · Moon

On 28 July 2116 the asteroid will pass about 0.03 AU (4,500,000 km; 2,800,000 mi) from Earth.

=== Close flybys of larger asteroids ===
Asteroids roughly 50+ meters in diameter (H≤24) that passed inside 1 lunar distance from 2009 to 2019
Asteroid	Date	Distance (thousand km)	H	Diameter (meters) (albedo=0.15)
2019 OK	2019-07-25	71	23.3	75
2019 OD	2019-07-24	357	23.5	68
2010 WC9	2018-05-15	202	23.6	65
2018 GE3	2018-04-15	192	23.8	60
2018 AH	2018-01-02	296	22.5	110
367943 Duende	2013-02-15	34	24.0	54
2011 XC2	2011-12-03	347	23.2	79
(308635) 2005 YU55	2011-11-08	324	21.9	140

Asteroids in the 20 m (66 ft) Chelyabinsk meteor size range to 50 m (160 ft) Tunguska size range (absolute magnitude H ~26–24) approach closer than the Moon about once per month. Asteroids with an absolute magnitude of 26–24 will vary in size from 17 to 94 m (56 to 308 ft) depends on the objects albedo (how reflective it is).

=== Potential impact effects ===
If 2019 OK is around 100 m (330 ft) in diameter, an Earth impact could have released as much power as the 50 megatons generated by the Tsar Bomba hydrogen bomb. If 2019 OK is around the middle of the size estimates, it could instead have released the equivalent explosive energy of about 10 megatons of TNT similar to the 1908 Tunguska event that flattened 2,000 km^{2} (770 square miles) of forest land. If 2019 OK is on the smaller size it still could have released over 30 times the energy of the atomic blast by Little Boy at Hiroshima.

== See also ==
- 2020 LD
- Asteroid impact prediction
- List of asteroid close approaches to Earth in 2019
- List of asteroid close approaches to Earth
- List of bolides (asteroids and meteoroids that impacted Earth)
