= Half-month =

Calendar subdivision in astronomy

The half-month is a calendar subdivision used in astronomy. Each calendar month is separated into two parts:

- days 1 to 15
- day 16 until the end of the month.

Newly identified small Solar System bodies, such as comets and asteroids, are given systematic designations that contain the half-month encoded as a letter of the English alphabet. For example, an object discovered in the second half of January would be identified with the letter B; if found in the first half of February, the letter would be C. The letter I is not used, to prevent confusion with the number 1. Instead, the letters proceed directly from H (April 16–30) to J (May 1–15). The letter appears in the provisional designation, then when the object is confirmed the letter is incorporated into the comet designation (for comets) or minor planet designation (for asteroids and other minor planets).

Half-month letters

Letter	Dates
A	January 1–15
B	January 16–31
C	February 1–15
D	February 16–29
E	March 1–15
F	March 16–31
G	April 1–15
H	April 16–30

Letter	Dates
J	May 1–15
K	May 16–31
L	June 1–15
M	June 16–30
N	July 1–15
O	July 16–31
P	August 1–15
Q	August 16–31

Letter	Dates
R	September 1–15
S	September 16–30
T	October 1–15
U	October 16–31
V	November 1–15
W	November 16–30
X	December 1–15
Y	December 16–31

== See also ==
- Naming of comets
- Fortnight
