= Extraterrestrial materials =

Natural objects that originated in outer space

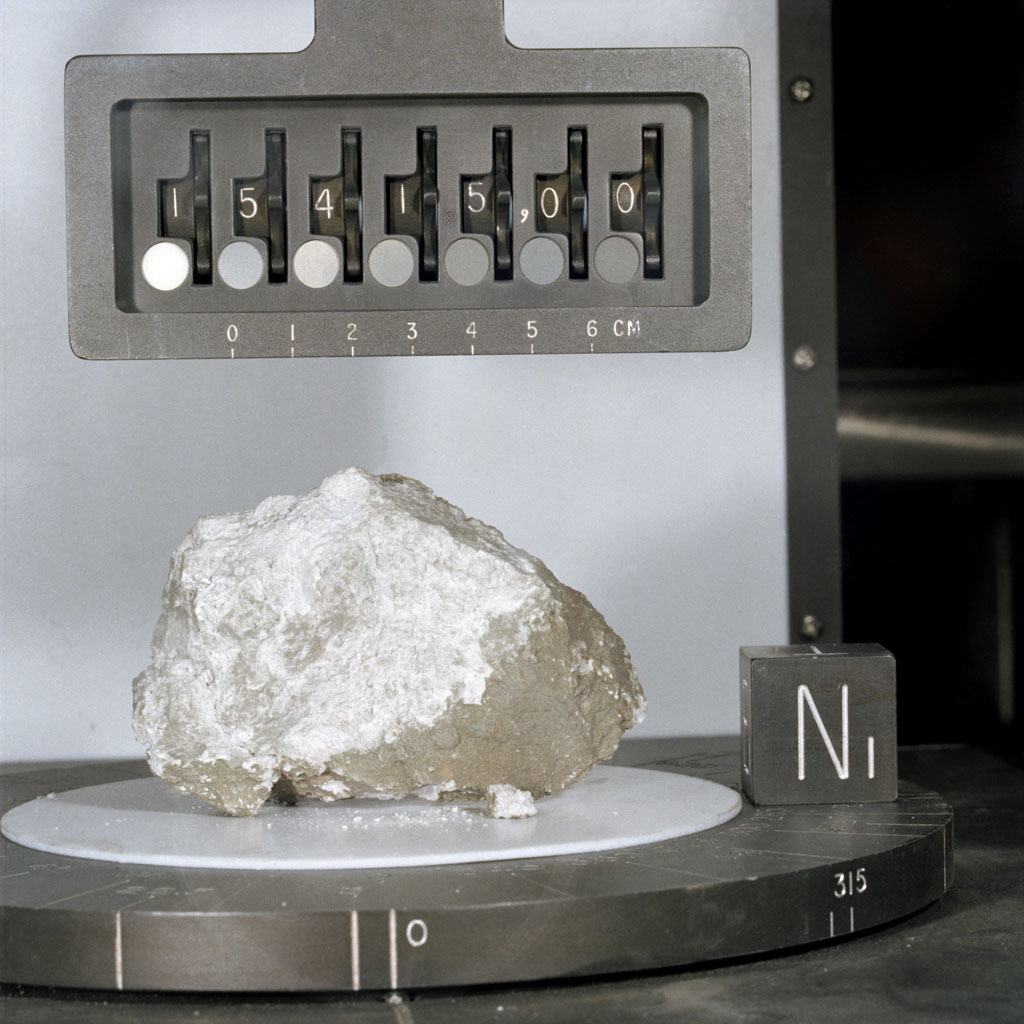
Lunar sample 15415, also known as the "Genesis Rock"

Extraterrestrial material refers to natural objects now on Earth that originated in outer space. Such materials include cosmic dust and meteorites, as well as samples brought to Earth by sample return missions from the Moon, asteroids and comets, as well as solar wind particles.

Extraterrestrial materials are of value to science as they preserve the primitive composition of the gas and dust from which the Sun and the Solar System formed.

== Categories ==
Extraterrestrial material for study on earth can be classified into a few broad categories, namely:

1. Meteorites too large to vaporize on atmospheric entry but small enough to leave fragments lying on the ground, among which are included likely specimens from the asteroid and Kuiper belts as well as from the moon and from Mars.
2. Moon rocks brought to Earth by robotic and crewed lunar missions.
3. Cosmic dust collected on Earth, in the Earth's stratosphere, and in low Earth orbit which likely include particles from the present day interplanetary dust cloud, as well as from comets.
4. Specimens collected by sample-return missions from comets, asteroids, solar wind, which include "stardust particles" from the present-day interstellar medium.
5. Presolar grains (extracted from meteorites and interplanetary dust particles) that predate the formation of the Solar System. These are the most pristine and valuable samples.

=== Collected on Earth ===
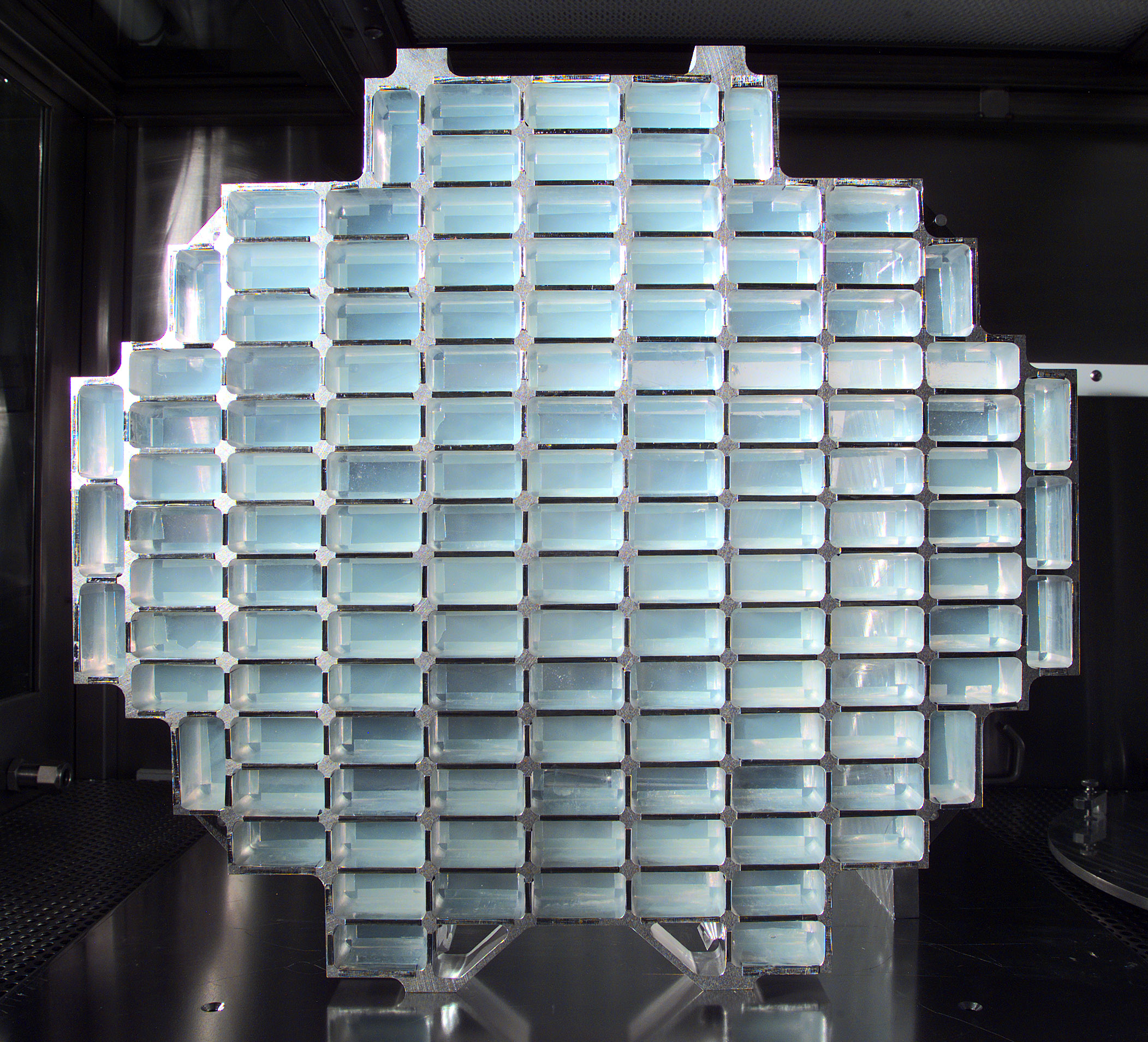
Dust collector with aerogel blocks as used by the Stardust and Tanpopo missions.

Examples of extraterrestrial material collected on Earth include cosmic dust and meteorites. Some of the meteorites found on Earth had their origin in another Solar System object such as the Moon, Martian meteorites, and the HED meteorite from Vesta. Another example is the Japanese Tanpopo mission that collected dust from low Earth orbit. In 2019, researchers found interstellar dust in Antarctica which they relate to the Local Interstellar Cloud. The detection of interstellar dust in Antarctica was done by the measurement of the radionuclides Fe-60 and Mn-53 by highly sensitive Accelerator mass spectrometry, where Fe-60 is the clear signature for a recent-supernova origin.

=== Sample-return missions ===
To date, samples of Moon rock have been collected by robotic and crewed missions. The comet Wild 2 (Genesis mission) and the asteroid Itokawa (Hayabusa mission) have each been visited by robotic spacecraft that returned samples to Earth, and samples of the solar wind were also returned by the robotic Genesis mission.

Similar sample-return missions were OSIRIS-REx to asteroid Bennu, Hayabusa2 to asteroid Ryugu, and Tianwen-2 to asteroid 469219 Kamoʻoalewa. Several sample-return mission are planned for the Moon, Mars, and Mars' moons (see: Sample-return mission#List of missions).

Material obtained from sample-return missions are considered pristine and uncontaminated, and their curation and study must take place at specialized facilities where the samples are protected from Earthly contamination and from contact with the atmosphere. These facilities are specially designed to preserve both the sample integrity and protect the Earth from potential biological contamination. Restricted bodies include planets or moons suspected to have either past or present habitable environments to microscopic life, and therefore must be treated as extremely biohazardous.

== Lines of study ==
Samples analyzed on Earth can be matched against findings of remote sensing, for more insight into the processes that formed the Solar System.

=== Elemental and isotopic abundances ===
Present day elemental abundances are superimposed on an (evolving) galactic-average set of elemental abundances that was inherited by the Solar System, along with some atoms from local nucleosynthesis sources, at the time of the Sun's formation. Knowledge of these average planetary system elemental abundances is serving as a tool for tracking chemical and physical processes involved in the formation of planets, and the evolution of their surfaces.

Isotopic abundances provide important clues to the origin, transformation and geologic age of the material being analyzed.

Extraterrestrial materials also carry information on a wide range of nuclear processes. These include for example: (i) the decay of now-extinct radionuclides from supernova byproducts introduced into Solar System materials shortly before the collapse of our solar nebula, and (ii) the products of stellar and explosive nucleosynthesis found in almost undiluted form in presolar grains. The latter are providing astronomers with information on exotic environments from the early Milky Way galaxy.

Noble gases are particularly useful because they avoid chemical reactions, secondly because many of them have more than one isotope on which to carry the signature of nuclear processes, and because they are relatively easy to extract from solid materials by simple heating. As a result, they play a pivotal role in the study of extraterrestrial materials.

=== Nuclear spallation effects ===
Particles subject to bombardment by sufficiently energetic particles, like those found in cosmic rays, also experience the transmutation of atoms of one kind into another. These spallation effects can alter the trace element isotopic composition of specimens in ways which allow researchers to deduct the nature of their exposure in space.

These techniques have been used, for example, to look for (and determine the date of) events in the pre-Earth history of a meteorite's parent body (like a major collision) that drastically altered the space exposure of the material in that meteorite. For example, the Murchison meteorite landed in Australia in 1967, but its parent body apparently underwent a collision event about 800,000 years ago which broke it into meter-sized pieces.

=== Astrobiology ===
Astrobiology is an interdisciplinary scientific field concerned with the origins, early evolution, distribution, and future of life in the universe. It involves investigations on the presence of the organic compounds on comets, asteroids, Mars or the moons of the giant planets. Several sample-return missions to asteroids and comets are currently in the works with a key interest in astrobiology. More samples from asteroids, comets and moons could help determine whether life formed in other astronomical bodies, and if it could have been carried to Earth by meteorites or comets — a process termed panspermia.

The abundant organic compounds in primitive meteorites and interplanetary dust particles are thought to originate largely in the interstellar medium. However, this material may have been modified in the protoplanetary disk and has been modified to varying extents in the asteroidal parent bodies.

Cosmic dust contains complex organic compounds (amorphous organic solids with a mixed aromatic-aliphatic structure) that can be created naturally by stars and radiation. These compounds, in the presence of water and other habitable factors, are thought to have produced and spontaneously assembled the building blocks of life.

=== Origin of water on Earth ===
The origin of water on Earth is the subject of a significant body of research in the fields of planetary science, astronomy, and astrobiology. Isotopic ratios provide a unique "chemical fingerprint" that is used to compare Earth's water with reservoirs elsewhere in the Solar System. One such isotopic ratio, that of deuterium to hydrogen (D/H), is particularly useful in the search for the origin of water on Earth. However, when and how that water was delivered to Earth is the subject of ongoing research.

== See also ==
- Cosmochemistry
- Extraterrestrial sample curation
- Glossary of meteoritics
- Interplanetary dust cloud
- List of Martian meteorites
- Mars sample-return mission
