= Extraterrestrial sample curation =

Use and preservation of extraterrestrial samples

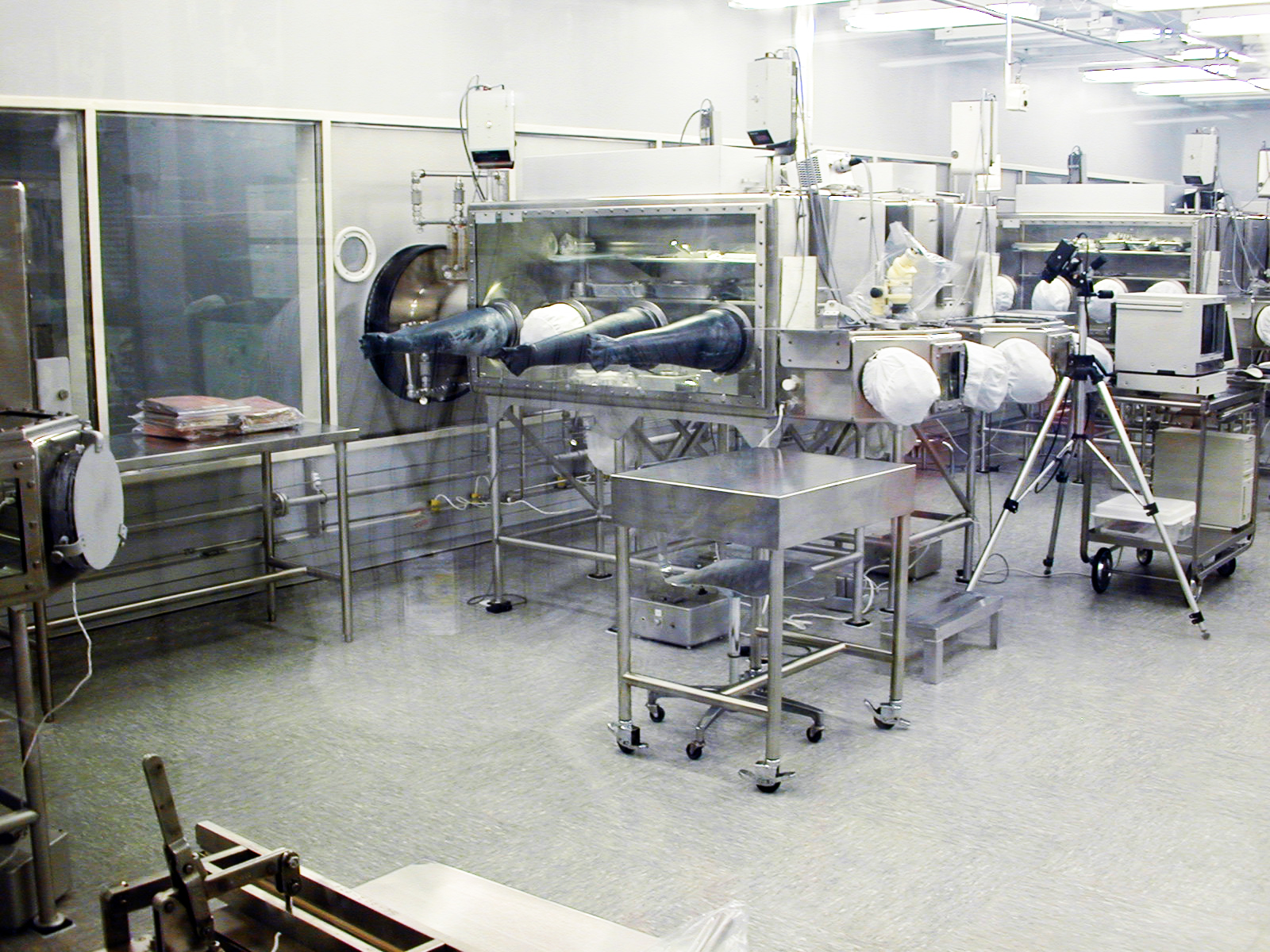
Processing facility at NASA's Astromaterials Research and Exploration Science Directorate (ARES)

The curation of extraterrestrial samples (astromaterials) obtained by sample-return missions takes place at facilities specially designed to preserve both the sample integrity and protect the Earth. Astromaterials are classified as either non-restricted or restricted, depending on the nature of the Solar System body. Non-restricted samples include the Moon, asteroids, comets, solar particles and space dust. Restricted bodies include planets or moons suspected to have either past or present habitable environments to microscopic life, and therefore must be treated as extremely biohazardous.

== Overview ==
Spacecraft instruments are subject to mass and power constraints, in addition to the limitations imposed by the extreme environment of outer space on the sensitive science instruments, so bringing extraterrestrial material to Earth is desired for extensive scientific analyses. For the purpose of planetary protection, astromaterial samples brought to Earth by sample-return missions must be received and curated in a specially designed and specially equipped biocontainment facility that must also double as a cleanroom to preserve the science value of the samples.

Samples brought from non-restricted bodies such as the Moon, asteroids, comets, solar particles and space dust, are processed at specialized facilities rated Biosafety level-3 (BSL-3). Samples brought to Earth from a planet or moon suspected to have either past or present habitable environments to microscopic life would make it a Category V body, and must be curated at facilities rated Biosafety level-4 (BSL-4), as agreed in the Article IX of the Outer Space Treaty. However, the existing BSL-4 facilities in the world do not have the complex requirements to ensure the preservation and protection of Earth and the sample simultaneously. While existing BSL-4 facilities deal primarily with fairly well-known organisms, a BSL-4 facility focused on extraterrestrial samples must pre-plan the systems carefully while being mindful that there will be unforeseen issues during sample evaluation and curation that will require independent thinking and solutions. A challenge is that, while it is relatively easy to simply contain the samples once returned to Earth, researchers will want to take a portion and perform analyses. During all these handling procedures, the samples would need to be protected from Earthly contamination and from contact with the atmosphere.

== Non-restricted materials ==
OSIRIS-REx's Sample Return Capsule in Utah after reentry to Earth

As of 2019, only the Japanese space agency JAXA and the United States space agency NASA operate BSL-3 laboratories in the world exclusively dedicated to the curation of samples from non-restricted bodies. The key feature of JAXA's curation facility, the Extraterrestrial Sample Curation Center, is the ability to observe, take out a portion and preserve a precious return-sample without being exposed to the atmosphere and other contaminants.

The Luna Soviet missions samples are studied and stored at the Vernadsky Institute of Geochemistry and Analytical Chemistry at the Russian Academy of Sciences.

== Restricted materials ==
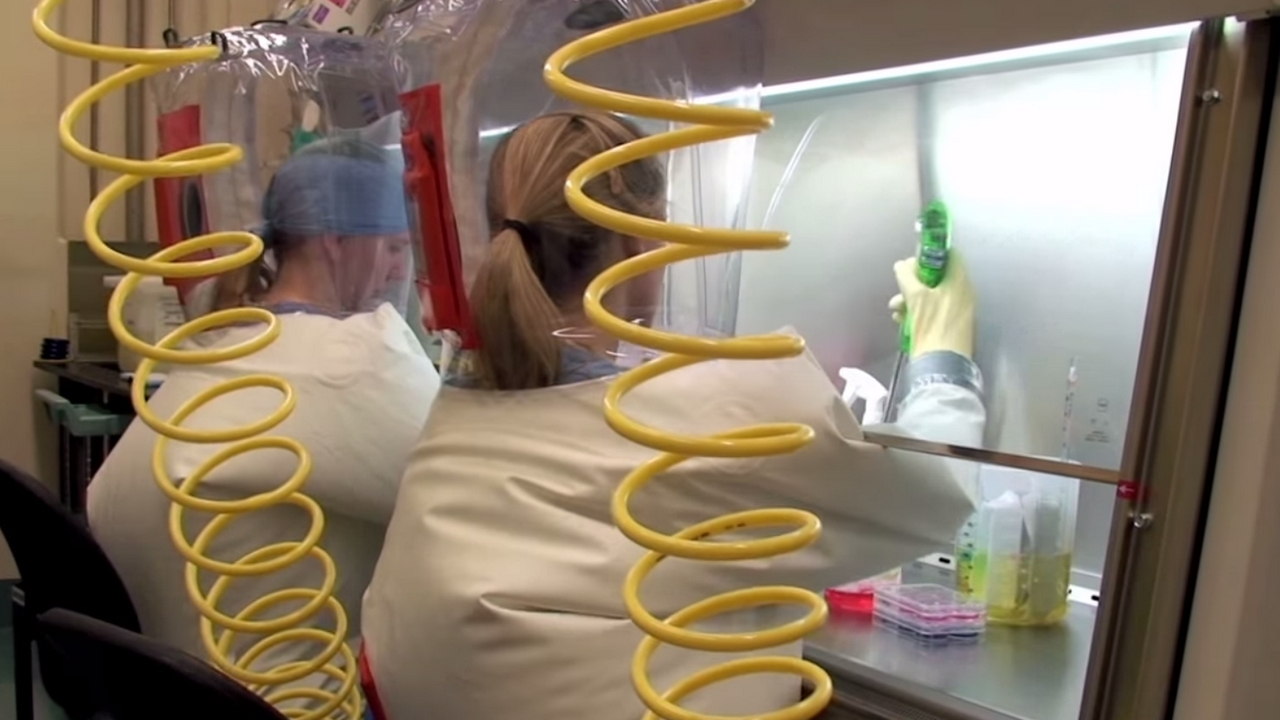
Working inside a Biosafety level 4 laboratory with air hoses providing positive air pressure

Return-samples obtained from a Category V body, must be curated at facilities rated Biosafety level-4 (BSL-4). Because the existing BSL-4 facilities in the world do not have the complex requirements to ensure the preservation and protection of Earth and the sample simultaneously, there are currently at least two proposals to build a BSL-4 facility dedicated to curation of restricted (potentially biohazard) extraterrestrial materials.

The first is the European Sample Curation Facility (ESCF), proposed to be built in Vienna, would curate non-restricted samples as well as BSL-4 biocontainment of restricted material obtained from Category V bodies such as Mars, Europa, Enceladus, etc.

The other proposal is by NASA and is tentatively known as the Mars Sample-Return Receiving Facility (MSRRF). At least three different designs were submitted in 2009. If funded, this American facility would be expected to take 7 to 10 years from design to completion, and an additional two years is recommended for the staff to become proficient and accustomed to the facilities. NASA is also assessing a 2017 proposal to build a mobile and modular BSL-4 facility to secure a sample return capsule at the landing site to conduct preliminary biohazard analyses. After completion of biohazard testing, decisions could be made to sterilize the sample or transport all or portions to a permanent quarantine storage facility anywhere in the world.

The systems of such facilities must be able to contain unknown biohazards, as the sizes of any putative alien microorganisms or infectious agents are unknown. Ideally it should filter particles of 0.01 μm or larger, and release of a particle 0.05 μm or larger is unacceptable under any circumstance. The reason for this extremely small size limit of 0.01 μm is for consideration of gene transfer agents (GTAs) which are virus-like particles that are produced by some microorganisms that package random segments of DNA capable of horizontal gene transfer. These randomly incorporate segments of the host genome and can transfer them to other evolutionarily distant hosts, and do that without killing the new host. In this way many archaea and bacteria can swap DNA with each other. This raises the possibility that Martian life, if it has a common origin with Earth life in the distant past, could swap DNA with Earth microorganisms in the same way. Another reason for the 0.01 μm limit is because of the discovery of ultramicrobacteria as small as 0.2 μm across.

Robotic advocates consider that humans represent a significant source of contamination for the samples, and that a BSL-4 facility with robotic systems is the best way forward.

== See also ==
- Astrobiology – Science concerned with life in the universe
- Biocontainment – Physical containment of pathogenic organisms or agents in microbiology laboratories
- Biological hazard – Biological material that poses serious risks to the health of living organisms
- Mars sample-return mission – Mars mission to collect rock and dust samples
- Planetary geology – Geological study of planets
- Safety engineering – Engineering discipline
- Select agent – Controlled biological agents in the United States
