= TAGSAM =

Regolith scoop used on asteroid Bennu by the NASA probe OSIRIS-REx

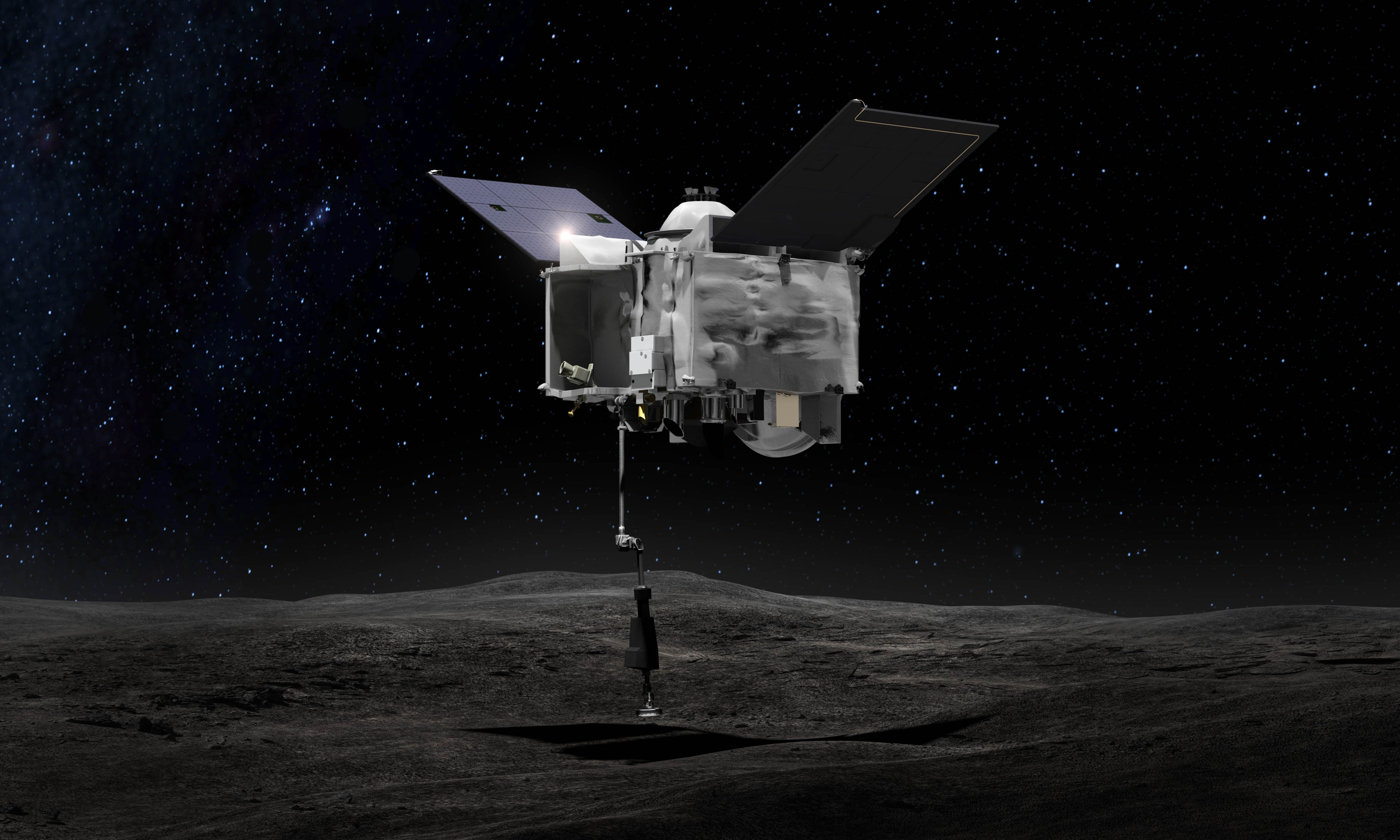
Illustration of OSIRIS-REx with TAGSAM extended

TAGSAM or Touch-and-Go Sample Acquisition Mechanism is a robotic arm on the OSIRIS-REx space probe designed and used for collecting a sample from asteroid 101955 Bennu. OSIRIS-REx was launched in 2016. It arrived at asteroid Bennu in December 2018, and began scientific studies. It collected a sample of the material making up the surface of Bennu in 2020 and returned it to Earth in 2023.

== Overview ==
TAGSAM is a robotic arm attached to the main body of the spacecraft that collects a sample from the asteroid, and puts the samples into the Earth return vehicle. Bennu is about 500 meters in diameter and has very low gravity, so the arm must perform the collection in near zero gravity, yet still contend with some gravitational forces from the asteroid. One issue with small asteroids is their unique gravitational environment, and Bennu became the smallest body orbited by a spacecraft.

TAGSAM was designed to take up to three samples from the asteroid, although in the event the first sample was so large no other samples were attempted. The collection head was filled using a nitrogen gas injection that stired up the regolith. The arm is about 11 feet (3.4 meters) long, with three joints for articulation. SamCam acquires images of the collection head. Two major parts of TAGSAM are the robotic arm and the sample collection head.

The arm was used in conjunction with several instruments on the spacecraft including three cameras, three spectrometers, and a laser altimeter.

Two identical TAGSAM units were made, one for use on the spacecraft called the flight unit, and another for testing on Earth called the qualification unit.

Animation of TAGSAM arm moving

== Timeline ==
Timelapse of the 5-minute period on 20 October 2020 of the sample capture by TAGSAM, beginning at 25 meters above the surface, making contact at 10 cm/sec, and then firing thrusters to back away which kicks up loose debris.

- 17 October 2018 — TAGSAM head cover jettisoned
- 25 October 2018 — Frangibolts fired, releasing the TAGSAM arm
- 14 November 2018 — TAGSAM arm fully extended for the first time
- 15 April 2020 — rehearsal manouvre performed by OSIRIS-REx
- 20 October 2020 — successful TAGSAM deployment and sample collection
- 24 September 2023 — safe touchdown on Earth of the OSIRIS-REx sample return capsule

== See also ==
- CAESAR
- Sample-return mission
