= Extraterrestrial Sample Curation Center =

Observation facility of JAXA

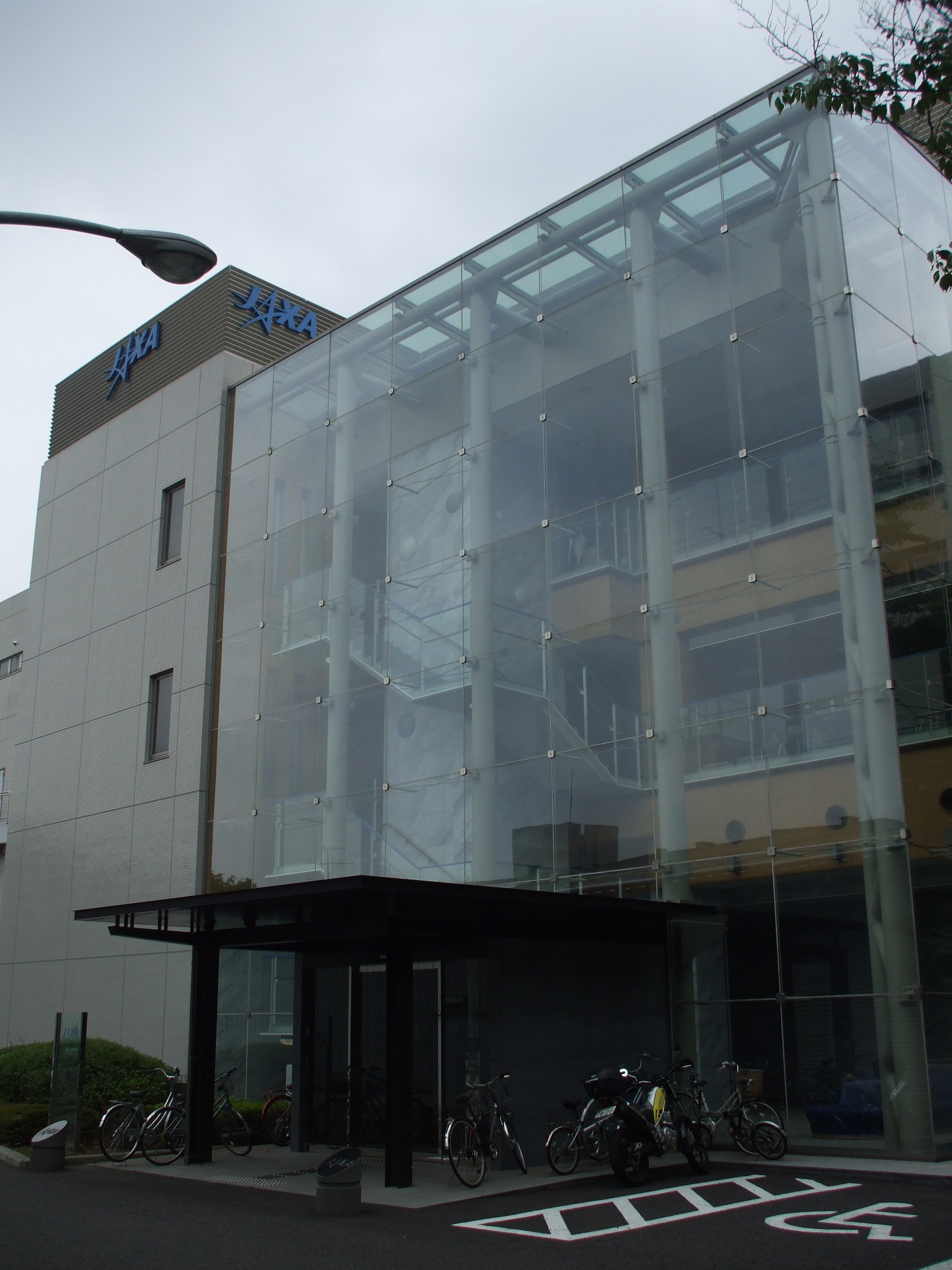
The Planetary Material Sample Curation Facility of JAXA's Sagamihara Campus

The Planetary Material Sample Curation Facility (Japanese: 惑星物質試料受入れ設備) (PMSCF), commonly known as the Extraterrestrial Sample Curation Center (ESCuC, 地球外試料キュレーションセンター) is the facility where Japan Aerospace Exploration Agency (JAXA) conducts the curation works of extraterrestrial materials retrieved by some sample-return missions. They work closely with Japan's Astromaterials Science Research Group. Its objectives include documentation, preservation, preparation, and distribution of samples. All samples collected are made available for international distribution upon request.

== Overview ==
The conceptual studies for JAXA's curation facility begun in 2005, the specifications were decided in 2007, and the facility was completed in 2008 in time to receive the asteroid samples retrieved by the Hayabusa mission. The facility is composed of several cleanrooms rated from ISO7 (for gowning and cleaning rooms) to the cleanest ISO5 (for sample handling and storage). The key feature of JAXA's ESCuC curation facility is the ability to observe, take out a portion and preserve a precious returned sample, without being exposed to the terrestrial atmosphere and other contaminants. Due to the nature of the Hayabusa returned samples, the facility developed the capability to handle particles as small as 10 μm by using a system based on electrostatic micromanipulation within a clean chamber in contact with either vacuum or an inert gas (usually nitrogen).

The facility also features a wide variety of laboratories and analyzers, including XCT/XRD, TEM/STEM, EPMA, SIMS, FTIR, Raman, NAA, noble-gas-MS, and ToF-SIMS.

The "Monitoring and Meeting Room" has recently been retrofitted to host the samples returned by the Hayabusa2 mission from the carbonaceous asteroid Ryugu.

== Catalogue ==
Samples include:

- Asteroid 25143 Itokawa, retrieved by the Hayabusa mission.
- Meteorites and standard samples
- Samples collected by the Tanpopo orbital experiment.
- Asteroid 162173 Ryugu, to be retrieved by Hayabusa2. Returned to Earth in December 2020.

Future samples expected

- Asteroid 101955 Bennu, to be retrieved by the NASA OSIRIS-REx mission. Returned to Earth on September 24, 2023.

== Similar facilities ==
Other facilities dedicated to the curation of pristine returned extraterrestrial samples are the NASA Johnson Space Center Astromaterials Acquisition and Curation Office, the Russian Vernadsky Institute of Geochemistry and Analytical Chemistry in Moscow for Luna samples and the CNSA curatorial facility for Chang'e 5 lunar samples. There are currently no pristine returned samples curatorial facility in Europe, even though preparatory studies have been conducted in the recent past.

== See also ==
- Astrobiology
- Biocontainment safety level
- Extraterrestrial materials
- Molecules detected in outer space
- Planetary protection
- Planetary science
