= OSIRIS-REx =

NASA asteroid sample return mission (2016-2023)

OSIRIS-REx OSIRIS-APEX
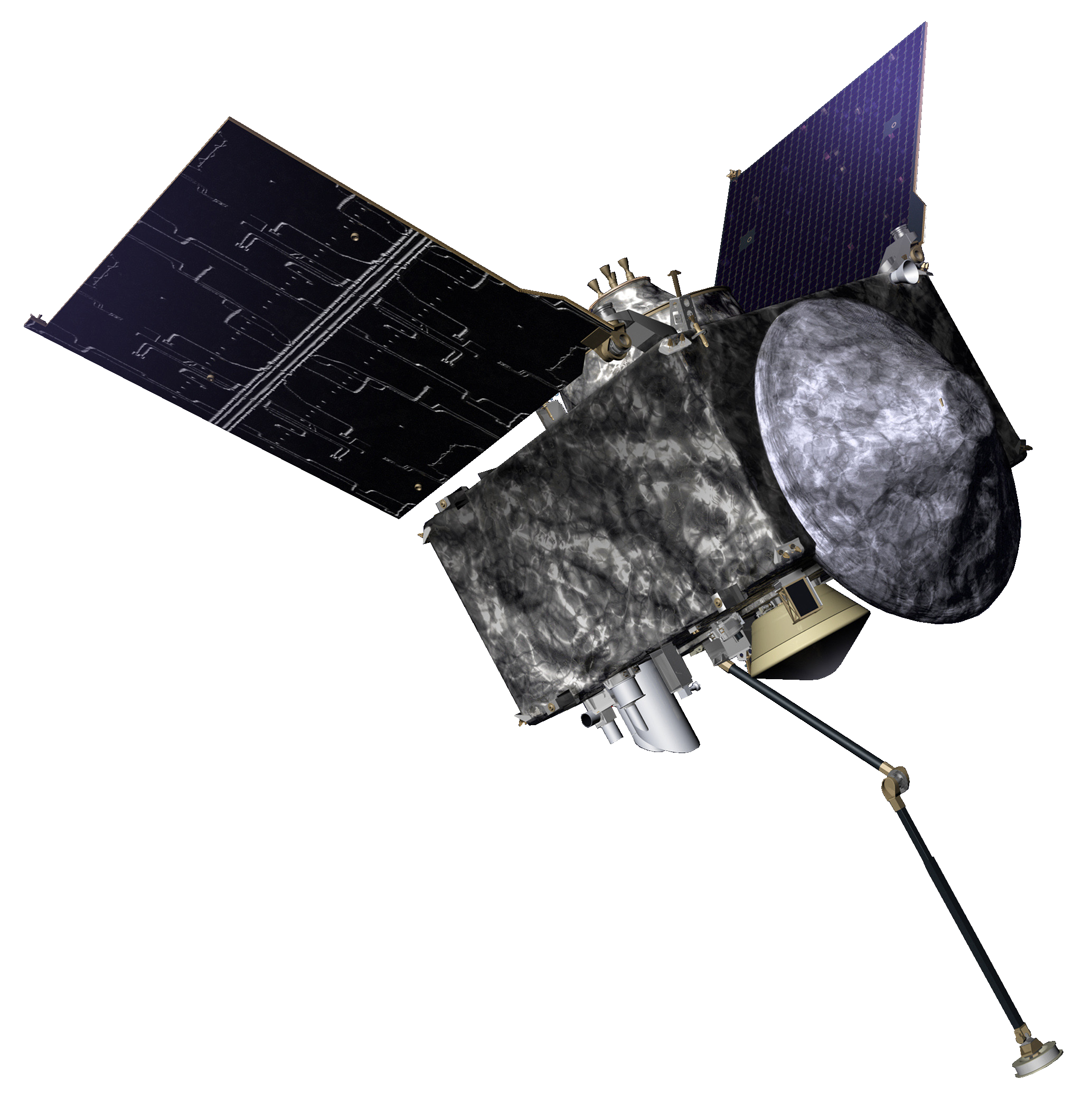
- Artist's rendering of the OSIRIS-REx spacecraft
- Names: OSIRIS-REx; OSIRIS-APEX; New Frontiers 3
- Mission type: Asteroid sample return
- Operator: NASA / Lockheed Martin
- COSPAR ID: 2016-055A
- SATCAT no.: 41757
- Website: www.asteroidmission.org
- Mission duration: 7 years (planned); 889 days at asteroid (actual); 10 years, 1 month, 4 days (elapsed)

Spacecraft properties
- Manufacturer: Lockheed Martin
- Launch mass: 2,110 kg (4,650 lb)
- Dry mass: 880 kg (1,940 lb)
- Dimensions: 2.44 × 2.44 × 3.15 m (8 ft 0 in × 8 ft 0 in × 10 ft 4 in)
- Power: 1226 to 3000 watts

Start of mission
- Launch date: 8 September 2016, 23:05 UTC
- Rocket: Atlas V 411 (AV-067)
- Launch site: Cape Canaveral SLC-41
- Contractor: United Launch Alliance (ULA)

End of mission
- Disposal: Sample Return Capsule: Recovered
- Landing date: Sample Return Capsule: 24 September 2023, 14:52 UTC
- Landing site: Utah Test and Training Range

Orbital parameters
- Reference system: Bennu-centric
- Altitude: 0.68–2.1 km (0.42–1.30 mi)
- Period: 22–62 hours

Flyby of Earth
- Closest approach: 22 September 2017
- Distance: 17,237 km (10,711 mi)

Bennu orbiter
- Orbital insertion: 31 December 2018 (Rendezvous: 3 December 2018)
- Orbital departure: 10 May 2021
- Sample mass: ~121.6 g (4.29 oz)

Bennu lander
- Landing date: 20 October 2020, 22:13 UTC
- Landing site: "Nightingale"

Flyby of Bennu
- Closest approach: 7 April 2021
- Distance: 3.5 km (2.2 mi)
Instruments
- OCAMS: OSIRIS-REx Camera Suite
- OLA: OSIRIS-REx Laser Altimeter
- OTES: OSIRIS-REx Thermal Emission Spectrometer
- OVIRS: OSIRIS-REx Visible and Infrared Spectrometer
- REXIS: Regolith X-ray Imaging Spectrometer
- TAGSAM: Touch-And-Go Sample Acquisition Mechanism
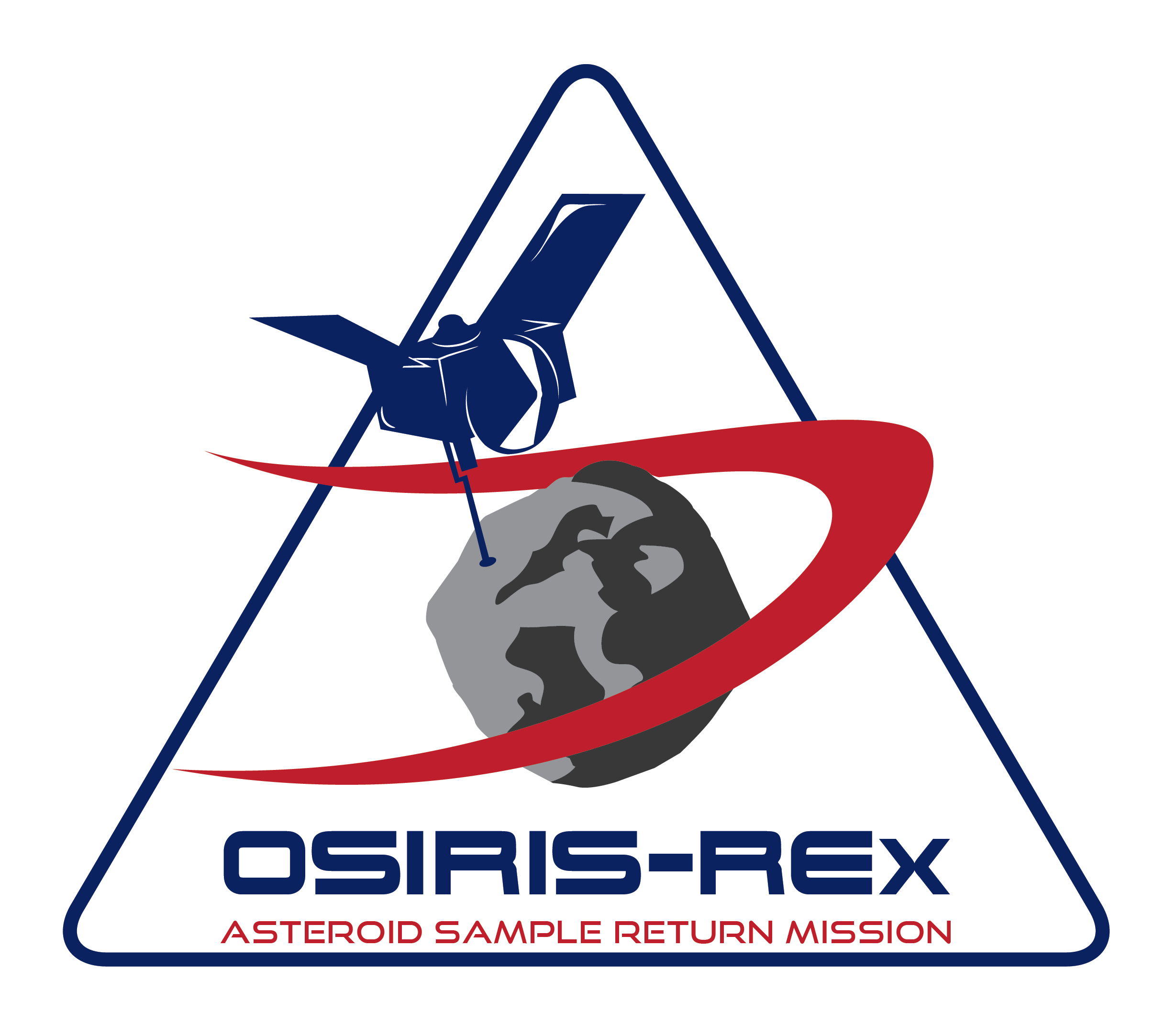
- OSIRIS-REx mission logo New Frontiers

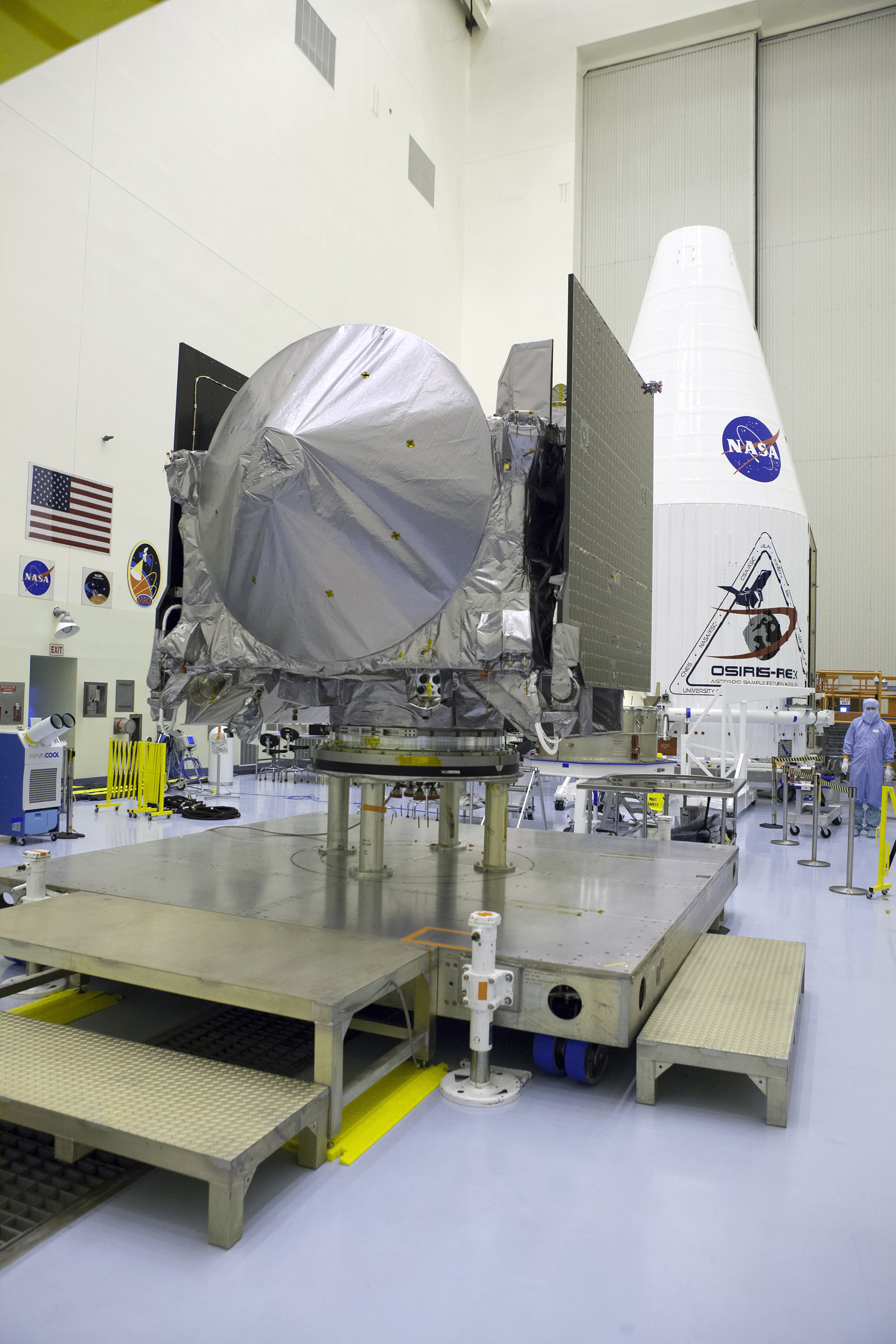
OSIRIS-REx in Launch Configuration

OSIRIS-REx (Note: Origins, Spectral Interpretation, Resource Identification, Security, Regolith Explorer) was a NASA asteroid-study and sample-return mission that visited and collected samples from 101955 Bennu, a carbonaceous near-Earth asteroid. The material, returned in September 2023, is expected to enable scientists to learn more about the formation and evolution of the Solar System, its initial stages of planet formation, and the source of organic compounds that led to the formation of life on Earth. Following the completion of the primary OSIRIS-REx (Regolith Explorer) mission, the spacecraft, renamed as OSIRIS-APEX (Apophis Explorer), began a follow-up mission to asteroid 99942 Apophis.

OSIRIS-REx was launched on September 8, 2016, flew past Earth on 22 September 2017 and rendezvoused with Bennu on 3 December 2018. It spent the next two years analyzing the surface to find a suitable site from which to extract a sample. On 20 October 2020, OSIRIS-REx touched down on Bennu and successfully collected a sample. OSIRIS-REx left Bennu on 10 May 2021 and returned its sample to Earth on 24 September 2023, subsequently starting its extended mission to study 99942 Apophis, where it will arrive in April 2029.

Bennu was chosen as the target of study because it is a "time capsule" from the birth of the Solar System. Bennu has a very dark surface and is classified as a B-type asteroid, a sub-type of the carbonaceous C-type asteroids. Such asteroids are considered primitive, having undergone little geological change from their time of formation. In particular, Bennu was selected because of the availability of pristine carbonaceous material, a key element in organic molecules necessary for life as well as representative of matter from before the formation of Earth. Organic molecules, such as amino acids, have previously been found in meteorite and comet samples, indicating that some ingredients necessary for life can be naturally synthesized in outer space.

The cost of the OSIRIS-REx mission is approximately US$800 million, not including the Atlas V launch vehicle, which is about US$183.5 million. The OSIRIS-APEX extended mission costs an additional US$200 million. It is the third planetary science mission selected in the New Frontiers program, after Juno and New Horizons. The principal investigator is Dante Lauretta from the University of Arizona, having taken over in 2011 after the original PI Michael Julian Drake died four months after the mission won approval from NASA.

OSIRIS-REx was the first United States spacecraft to return samples from an asteroid. Previous asteroid returns include the Japanese probes Hayabusa, which visited 25143 Itokawa in 2005, and Hayabusa2, which visited 162173 Ryugu in June 2018.

== Mission ==
Overall management, engineering, and navigation for the OSIRIS missions are provided by NASA's Goddard Space Flight Center, while the University of Arizona's Lunar and Planetary Laboratory provides principal science operations. Lockheed Martin Space Systems built the spacecraft and provides mission operations. The science team includes members from the United States, Canada, France, Germany, the United Kingdom, and Italy.

After traveling for approximately two years, the spacecraft rendezvoused with asteroid 101955 Bennu in December 2018, and began 505 days of surface mapping at a distance of approximately 5 km (3.1 mi). Results of that mapping were used by the mission team to select the site from which to take a sample of at least 60 g (2.1 oz) of material of the asteroid's surface. Then a close approach (without landing) was carried out to allow extension of a robotic arm to gather the sample.

Following the successful collection of material (121.6 grams (4.29 oz)), the sample was returned to Earth in a 46 kg (101 lb) capsule similar to that which returned the samples of Comet 81P/Wild on the space probe Stardust. The return trip to Earth was shorter than the outbound trip. The capsule landed by parachute at the Utah Test and Training Range on 24 September 2023 and was transported to the Johnson Space Center for processing in a dedicated research facility.

Asteroid Bennu, imaged by the OSIRIS-REx probe, 3 December 2018

OSIRIS-REx mission overview video

OSIRIS-REx launch

=== Launch ===
The launch was on 8 September 2016 at 23:05 UTC on a United Launch Alliance Atlas V 411 from Cape Canaveral, Space Launch Complex 41. The 411 rocket configuration consists of a RD-180 powered first stage with a single AJ-60A solid fuel booster, and a Centaur upper stage. OSIRIS-REx separated from the launch vehicle 55 minutes after ignition. The launch was declared "exactly perfect" by the mission's principal investigator, with no anomalies before or during launch.

=== Cruise phase ===
OSIRIS-REx entered the cruise phase shortly after separation from the launch vehicle, following successful solar panel deployment, propulsion system initiation, and establishment of a communication link with Earth. Its hyperbolic escape speed from Earth was about 5.41 km/s (3.36 mi/s). On 28 December 2016, the spacecraft successfully performed its first deep space maneuver to change its velocity by 431 m/s (1,550 km/h) using 354 kg (780 lb) of fuel. An additional, smaller firing of its thrusters on 18 January 2017 further refined its course for an Earth gravity assist on 22 September 2017. The cruise phase lasted until its encounter with Bennu in December 2018, after which it entered its science and sample collection phase.

During its cruise phase, OSIRIS-REx was used to search for a class of near-Earth objects known as Earth-Trojan asteroids as it passed through Sun–Earth L_{4} Lagrange point. Between 9 and 20 February 2017, the OSIRIS-REx team used the spacecraft's MapCam camera to search for the objects, taking about 135 survey images each day for processing by scientists at the University of Arizona. The search was beneficial even though no new trojans were found, as it closely resembled the operation required as the spacecraft approached Bennu, searching for natural satellites and other potential hazards. On 12 February 2017, while 673×10^{6} km (418×10^{6} mi) from Jupiter, the PolyCam instrument aboard OSIRIS-REx successfully imaged the giant planet and three of its moons, Callisto, Io, and Ganymede.

OSIRIS-REx flew by Earth on 22 September 2017.

=== Arrival and survey ===
On 3 December 2018, NASA confirmed that OSIRIS-REx had matched the speed and orbit of Bennu at a distance of about 19 km (12 mi), effectively reaching the asteroid. OSIRIS-REx performed closer passes of the Bennu surface, initially at about 6.5 km (4.0 mi) through December to further refine the shape and orbit of Bennu. Preliminary spectroscopic surveys of the asteroid's surface by the OSIRIS-REx spacecraft detected the presence of hydrated minerals in the form of clay. While researchers suspect that Bennu was too small to host water, the hydroxyl groups may have come from water present in its parent body before Bennu split off.

OSIRIS-REx entered orbit around Bennu on 31 December 2018 at about 1.75 km (1.09 mi) to start its extensive remote mapping and sensing campaign for the selection of a sample site. This is the closest distance that any spacecraft has orbited a celestial object, closer than the Rosetta's orbit of comet 67P/Churyumov–Gerasimenko at 7 km (4.3 mi). At this altitude, it took the spacecraft 62 hours to orbit Bennu. At the end of its detailed survey, the spacecraft entered a closer orbit with a radius of 1 km (0.62 mi).

Animation of OSIRIS-REx

Around the Sun

Around 101955 Bennu

Touchdown on Bennu

Landing on Earth

OSIRIS-REx · 101955 Bennu · Earth · Sun

=== Sample acquisition ===
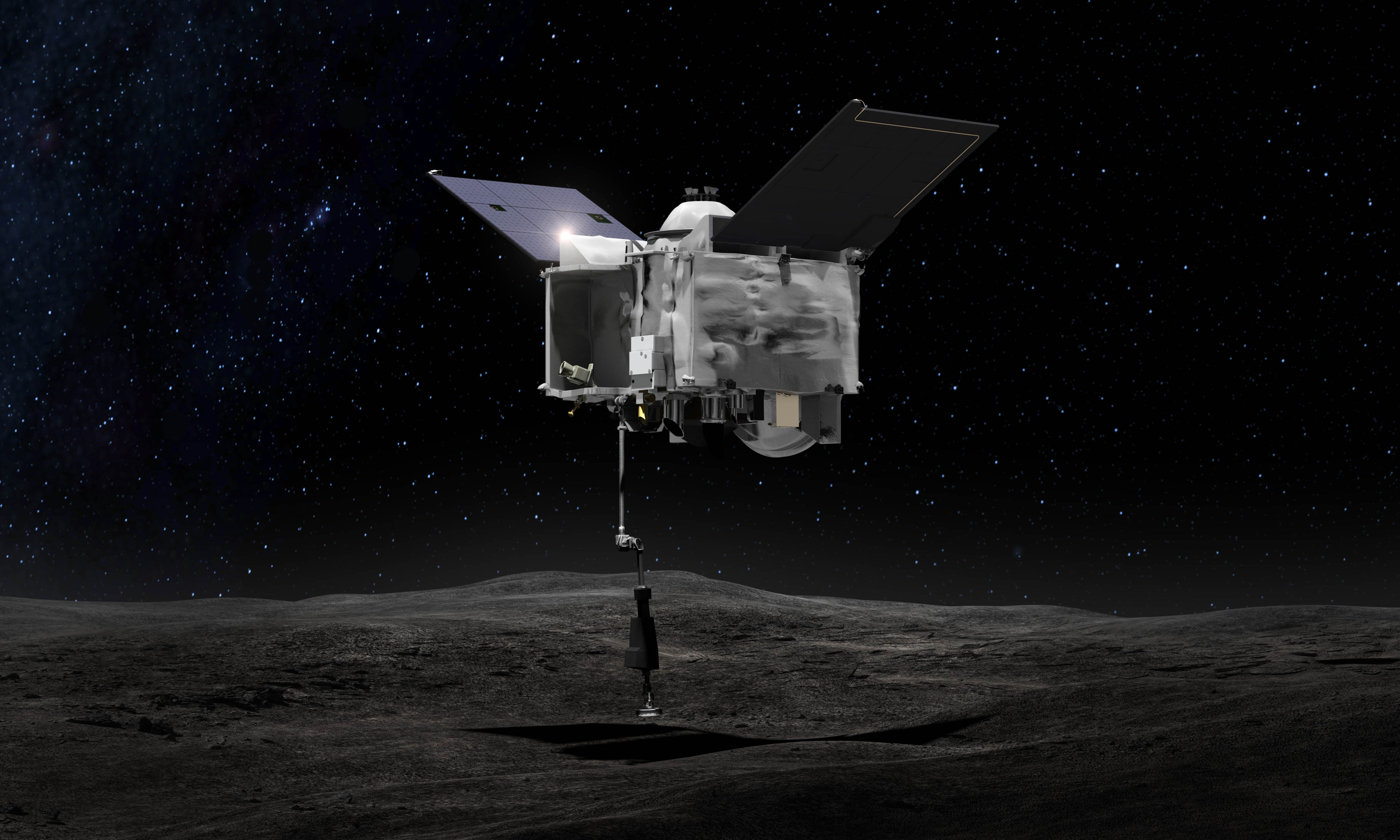
Artist's concept of TAGSAM instrument in operation

==== Procedure ====
Rehearsals were performed before sampling, during which the solar arrays were raised into a Y-shaped configuration to minimize the chance of dust accumulation during contact and provide more ground clearance in case the spacecraft tipped over (up to 45°) during contact. The descent was very slow, minimizing thruster firings prior to contact to reduce the likelihood of asteroid surface contamination by unreacted hydrazine propellant. On 20 October 2020, contact with the surface of Bennu was detected using accelerometers, and the impact force was dissipated by a spring in the TAGSAM arm.

Upon surface contact by the TAGSAM instrument, a burst of nitrogen gas was released to blow regolith particles smaller than 2 cm (0.8 in) into the sampler head at the end of the robotic arm. A five-second timer limited the collection time to mitigate the chance of a collision, and the probe then executed a back-away maneuver to depart safely.

The plan was then for OSIRIS-REx to perform a braking maneuver a few days later to halt the drift away from the asteroid in case it was necessary to return for another sampling attempt. It would then take images of the TAGSAM head to verify a sample had been acquired. If a sample was acquired, the spacecraft would rotate about the short axis of the sample arm to determine sample mass by measuring momentum of inertia and determine if it was in excess of the required 60 g (2.1 oz).

Both the braking and rotation maneuvers were canceled when images of the sample container clearly showed a large excess of material was collected, some of which was able to escape through the container's seal because some material had jammed the mechanism open. The collected material was scheduled for immediate storage in the Sample-Return Capsule. On 28 October 2020, the sample collector head was secured in the return capsule. Following the separation of the head from the collector arm, the arm was retracted into its launch configuration, and the Sample-Return Capsule lid was closed and latched preparing to return to Earth.

In addition to the bulk sampling mechanism, contact pads on the end of the sampling head made of tiny stainless steel loops (Velcro) passively collected dust grains smaller than 1 mm.

==== Operations ====
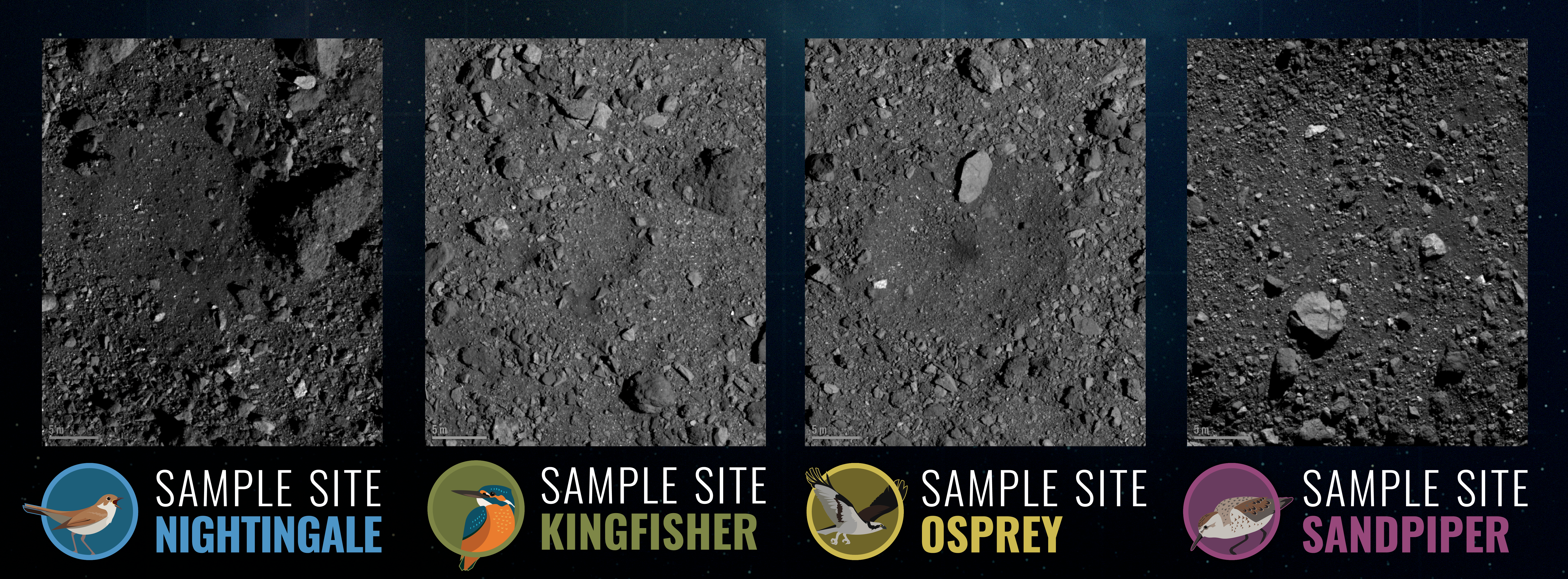
The final four candidate sample sites

The successful October 2020 sample collection, showing OSIRIS-REx touching down on the Nightingale sample site

Sample collection as seen by the navigation camera (00:47; 20 October 2020)

Images of the TAGSAM head showing that it is full of rocks and dust collected from Bennu and that it is leaking material into space

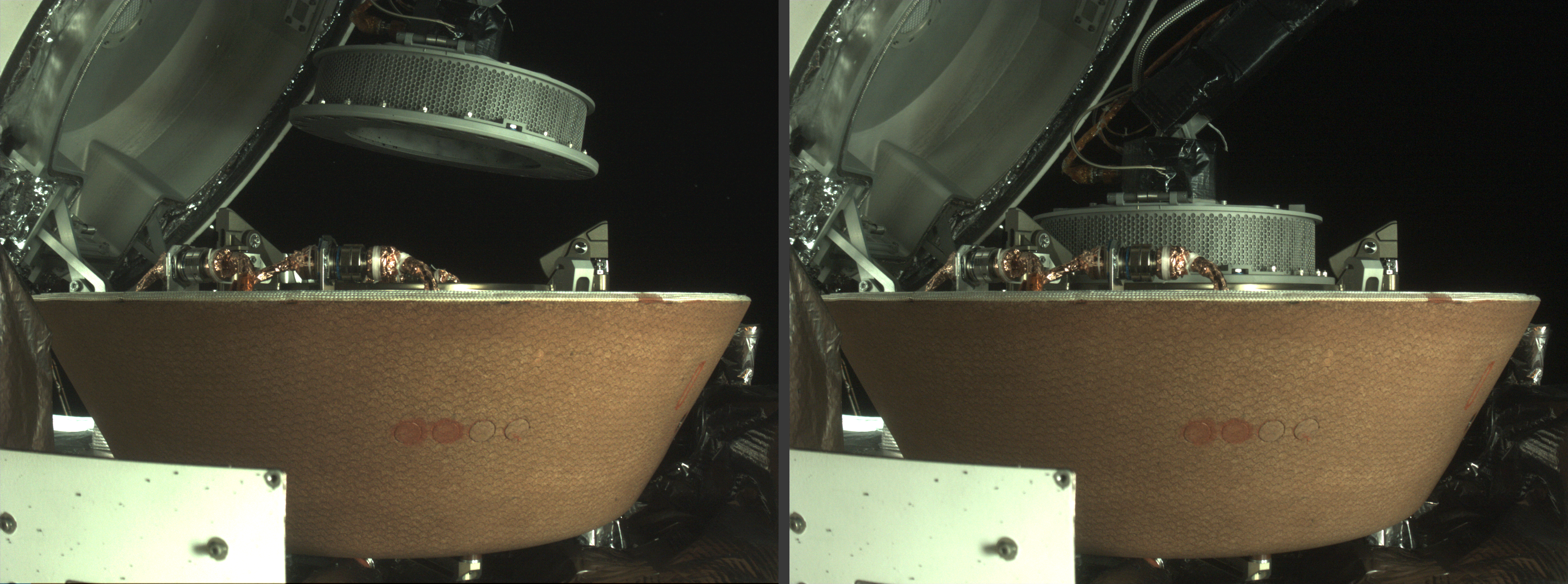
OSIRIS-REx successfully stows its sample of asteroid Bennu in October 2020.

The sample container closes.

NASA selected the final four candidate sample sites in August 2019, named Nightingale, Kingfisher, Osprey, and Sandpiper. On 12 December 2019, they announced that Nightingale had been selected as the primary sample site and Osprey was selected as the backup site. Both were within craters, with Nightingale near Bennu's north pole while Osprey was near the equator.

NASA planned to perform the first sampling in late August 2020; NASA's originally planned Touch-and-Go (TAG) sample collection was scheduled for 25 August 2020, but was rescheduled for 20 October 2020, at 22:13 UTC. On 15 April 2020, the first sample collection rehearsal was successfully performed at the Nightingale sample site. The exercise took OSIRIS-REx as close as 65 m (213 ft) from the surface before performing a back-away burn. A second rehearsal was successfully completed on 11 August 2020, bringing OSIRIS-REx down to 40 m (130 ft) from the surface. This was the final rehearsal before the sample collection scheduled for 20 October 2020, at 22:13 UTC.

At 22:13 UTC, on October 20, 2020, OSIRIS-REx successfully touched down on Bennu at a distance of 200 million miles (320 million kilometers) from Earth. NASA confirmed via images taken during sampling that the sampler had made contact. The spacecraft touched down within 92 cm (36 in) of the target location. A sample of the asteroid which was estimated to weigh at least 2 ounces (57 grams) was collected by OSIRIS-REx following the touch down. After imaging the TAGSAM head, NASA concluded that there were rocks wedged in the mylar flap meant to keep the sample inside, causing the sample to slowly escape into space. In order to prevent further loss of the sample through the flaps, NASA canceled the previously planned spinning maneuver meant to determine the mass of the sample as well as a navigational braking maneuver, and decided to stow the sample on 27 October 2020 rather than 2 November 2020 as originally planned, which was completed successfully. The collector head was observed hovering over the Sample Return Capsule (SRC) after the TAGSAM arm moved it into the proper position for capture, and the collector head was later secured onto the capture ring in the SRC.

When the head was seated into the Sample-Return Capsule's capture ring on 28 October 2020, the spacecraft performed a "backout check", which commanded the TAGSAM arm to back out of the capsule. This maneuver is designed to tug on the collector head and ensure that the latches – which keep the collector head in place – are well secured. Following the test, the mission team received telemetry confirming that the head was properly secured in the Sample-Return Capsule. Thereafter, on 28 October 2020, two mechanical parts on the TAGSAM arm were disconnected – these are the tube that carried the nitrogen gas to the TAGSAM head during sample collection and the TAGSAM arm itself. Over the next several hours, the mission team commanded the spacecraft to cut the tube that stirred up the sample through the TAGSAM head during sample collection, and separate the collector head from the TAGSAM arm. Once the team confirmed these activities were done, it commanded the spacecraft on 28 October 2020, to close and seal the Sample-Return Capsule, the final step of the sample stowage process of Bennu's samples. To seal the SRC, the spacecraft closed the lid and then secured two internal latches. On inspecting images, it was observed that a few particles had escaped from the collector head during the stowage procedure, but it was confirmed that no particles would hinder the stowage process, since the team was confident that a plentiful amount of material remained inside of the head, more than the 60 g (2.1 oz) needed, that is, 121.6 g (4.29 oz). The sample of Bennu was safely stored and ready for its journey to Earth. With the collector head secure inside the SRC, pieces of the sample would no longer be lost.

=== Sample return ===
Two members of the recovery team examine the return capsule after landing.

Close-up photo of the return capsule upon landing

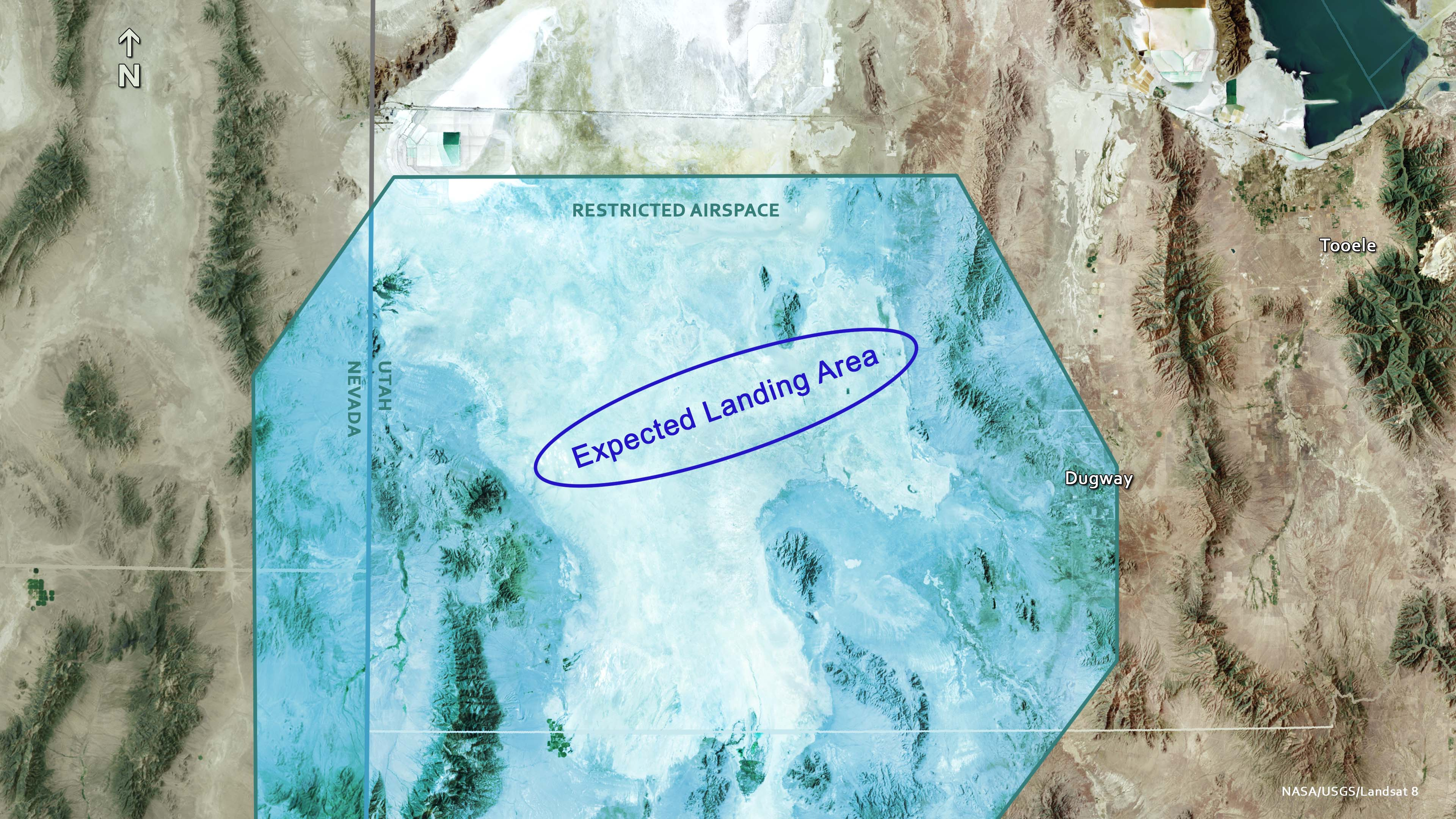
Expected landing area of return capsule in Utah

On 7 April 2021, OSIRIS-REx completed its final flyover of Bennu and began drifting away from the asteroid. On 10 May 2021, the spacecraft departed the vicinity of Bennu and began its two-year journey to Earth with the asteroid sample.

On 24 September 2023, at 4:42 a.m. MDT, at a distance of 63,000 miles (101,000 kilometers) from Earth, it ejected the sample return capsule, which re-entered the atmosphere at 27,650 miles per hour (44,500 km/h). Due to a mistake in wiring, the drogue parachute did not deploy as planned at 100,000 feet (30,400 meters). However, the main parachute was released when the spacecraft reached about 9,000 feet (2,700 meters), and it survived deployment despite higher than anticipated speeds. About 8:52 a.m. MDT the capsule landed at 11 mph (18 km/h) at the Utah Test and Training Range, one minute earlier than predicted. The main spacecraft maneuvered to a trajectory away from Earth for its extended mission to Apophis in 2029 called OSIRIS-APEX.

At 10:15 a.m. MDT, the capsule was taken from the landing site by helicopter. The sample will be analyzed at NASA's Astromaterials Research and Exploration Science Directorate (ARES) and at Japan's Extraterrestrial Sample Curation Center. Asteroid sample material requests will be considered and distributed to organizations worldwide by ARES.

On 11 October 2023, the recovered capsule was opened to reveal a "first look" at the asteroid sample contents. Further looks were reported on 13 December 2023 and revealed organic molecules and unknown materials that require study to determine their composition.

Some damaged fasteners prevented immediate opening, but, after three months, on 13 January 2024, NASA reported fully opening the recovered container. In total, 121.6 g (4.29 oz) of asteroidal material was recovered from the sample container.

The samples became available to the world’s scientists for research by request on 1 April 2024. On 15 May 2024, an overview of preliminary analytical studies on the returned samples was reported. In January 2025, NASA revealed that while the samples did not show evidence of life, their contents suggest that the conditions necessary for the emergence of life were likely widespread in the early solar system. The amount of ammonia, a volatile substance, in the samples indicates that Bennu emerged from the colder, outer regions of space.

In January 2025, it was reported that a wide range of carbon- and nitrogen-rich organic compounds have been identified in samples returned from Bennu, including 14 of the 20 amino acids that make up proteins in terrestrial organisms, as well as all four nucleobases (adenine, thymine, cytosine and guanine) that are the essential building blocks of DNA and RNA. The samples contain a nearly equal mix of left-handed (L) and right-handed (D) amino acids, raising questions about whether asteroids like Bennu helped shape Earth's biochemistry.

== Extended mission OSIRIS-APEX ==
On 25 April 2022, NASA confirmed that the mission would be extended. After dropping off its sample to Earth on 24 September 2023, the mission became OSIRIS-APEX (Apophis Explorer). As the new name suggests, its next target will be the near-Earth asteroid (and potentially hazardous object) 99942 Apophis. Apophis will make an extremely close pass to the Earth on 13 April 2029, although there is no chance for an impact during this or any subsequent flybys in the near future. Observations of Apophis will commence on 8 April 2029, and a few days later, on 21 April, OSIRIS-APEX is planned to rendezvous with the asteroid. OSIRIS-APEX will orbit Apophis for around 18 months in a regime similar to that at Bennu. The spacecraft will perform a maneuver, similar to sample collection at Bennu, by using its thrusters to disturb Apophis's surface, in order to expose and spectrally study the subsurface and the material beneath it. The mission, initially proposed to be shut down with the FY2026 budget, was saved after legislators included continued funding for the project in the final bill. For FY2027, the United States House Committee on Appropriations advanced the Commerce-Justice-Science (CJS) Appropriations bill on 13 May 2026 for further Senate and full-house Congress approvals - after the CJS subcommittee approval on 30 April 2026.

Animation of OSIRIS-APEX

Around the Sun

Around 99942 Apophis

OSIRIS-APEX · 99942 Apophis · Earth · Sun

== Name ==
OSIRIS-REx and OSIRIS-APEX are acronyms, and each letter or combination of letters relates to part of the respective projects:

- O – Origins
- SI – Spectral Interpretation
- RI – Resource Identification
- S – Security
- REx – Regolith Explorer
- APEX – Apophis Explorer

Each of these words was chosen to represent an aspect of this mission. For example, the S, for security means the security of Earth from impact by hazardous near-Earth objects (NEOs). Specifically it refers to better understanding the Yarkovsky effect, which can alter the trajectories of orbiting bodies. Regolith Explorer means that the mission will study the texture, morphology, geochemistry, and spectral properties of the regolith of asteroid Bennu while Apophis Explorer corresponds to the study of Apophis asteroid.

When its heritage concept was proposed in the Discovery Program in 2004, it was called only OSIRIS, with REx for "Regolith Explorer" used descriptively rather than as part of the name.

The mission name itself was a reference to the god Osiris. Dante Lauretta, deputy PI of the mission, was called "a mythology buff" by the mission PI Michael Drake: "he was doodling on a pad and trying to capture the principal themes of what we are trying to do with this mission—study life origins, identify resources, planetary security in the form of asteroid deflection—and he realized he got the name of Osiris out of that, an ancient god of Egypt who may have been one of the first pharaohs." Similar to how Osiris in mythology taught agriculture to humanity which brought civilization and life to Egypt, OSIRIS-REx aims to return samples from an asteroid that may contain organics that led to the origin of life on Earth. Rex is the Latin word for king which is a reference to Osiris being a mythical king of Egypt.

Asteroid Bennu is named after the mythological bird from ancient Egyptian mythology that was associated with the Sun and the creation of the cosmos, while the asteroid for the second mission is named after the ancient Egyptian god Apophis, who was associated with chaos and destruction. Both asteroids Bennu and Apophis are named after figures in Egyptian mythology just like OSIRIS-REx.

== Science objectives ==
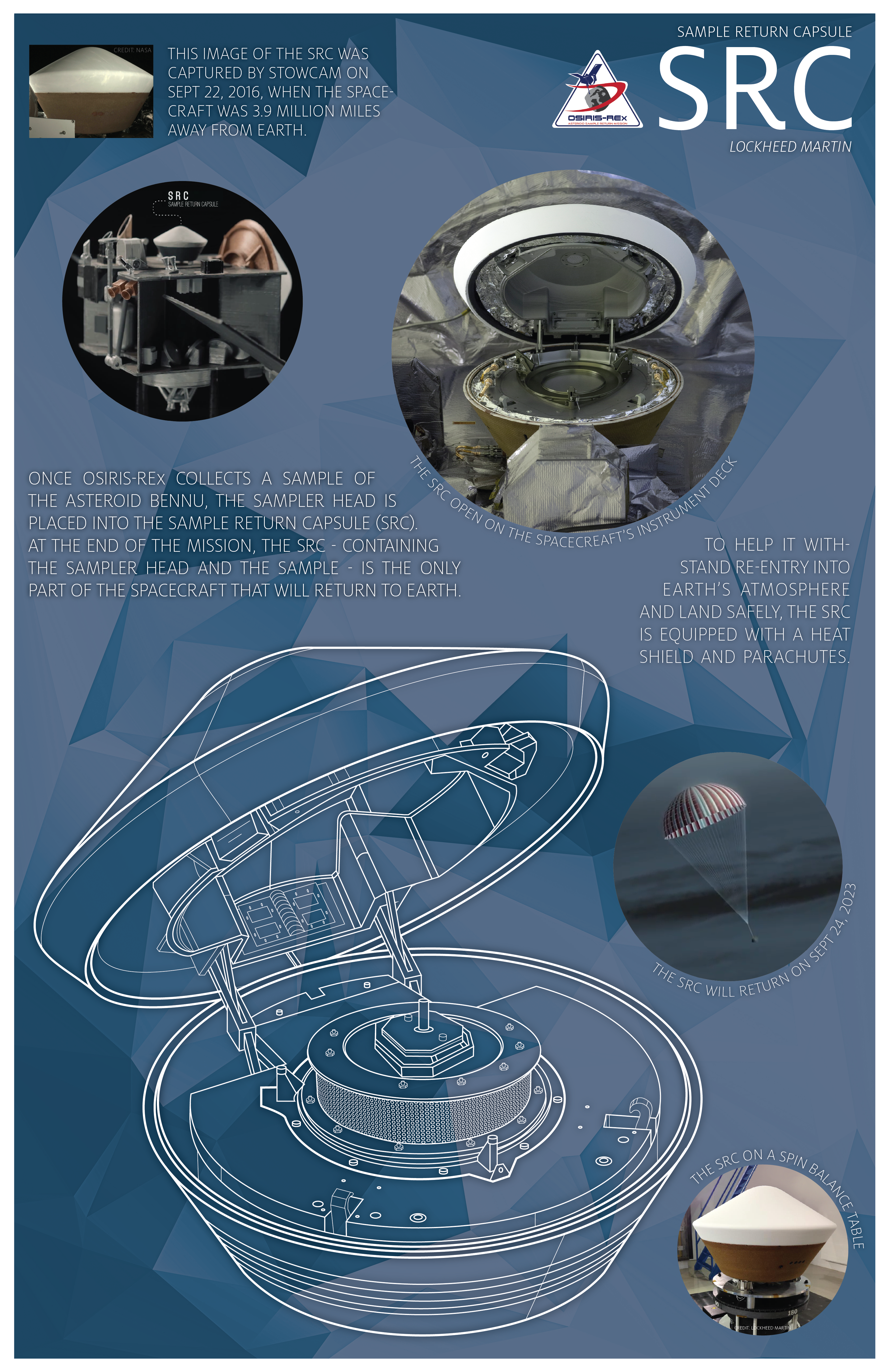
Sample Return Capsule infographic

The science objectives of the mission are:

- Return and analyze a sample of pristine carbonaceous asteroid regolith in an amount sufficient to study the nature, history, and distribution of its constituent minerals and organic compounds
- Map the global properties, chemistry, and mineralogy of a primitive carbonaceous asteroid to characterize its geologic and dynamic history and provide context for the returned samples
- Document the texture, morphology, geochemistry, and spectral properties of the regolith at the sampling site in situ at scales down to millimeters
- Measure the Yarkovsky effect (a thermal force on the object) on a potentially hazardous asteroid and constrain the asteroid properties that contribute to this effect
- Characterize the integrated global properties of a primitive carbonaceous asteroid to allow for direct comparison with ground-based telescopic data of the entire asteroid population

Telescopic observations have helped define the orbit of 101955 Bennu, a near-Earth object (NEO) with a mean diameter in the range of 480 to 511 m (1,575 to 1,677 ft). It completes an orbit of the Sun every 436.604 days (1.2 years). This orbit takes it close to the Earth every six years. Although the orbit is reasonably well known, scientists continue to refine it. It is critical to know the orbit of Bennu because recent calculations produced a cumulative probability of 1 in 1410 (or 0.071%) of impact with Earth from 2169 to 2199. One of the mission objectives is to refine understanding of non-gravitational effects (such as the Yarkovsky effect) on this orbit, and the implications of those effects for Bennu's collision probability. Knowing Bennu's physical properties will be critical for future scientists to understand when developing an asteroid impact avoidance mission.

== Specifications ==
3D model of OSIRIS-REx

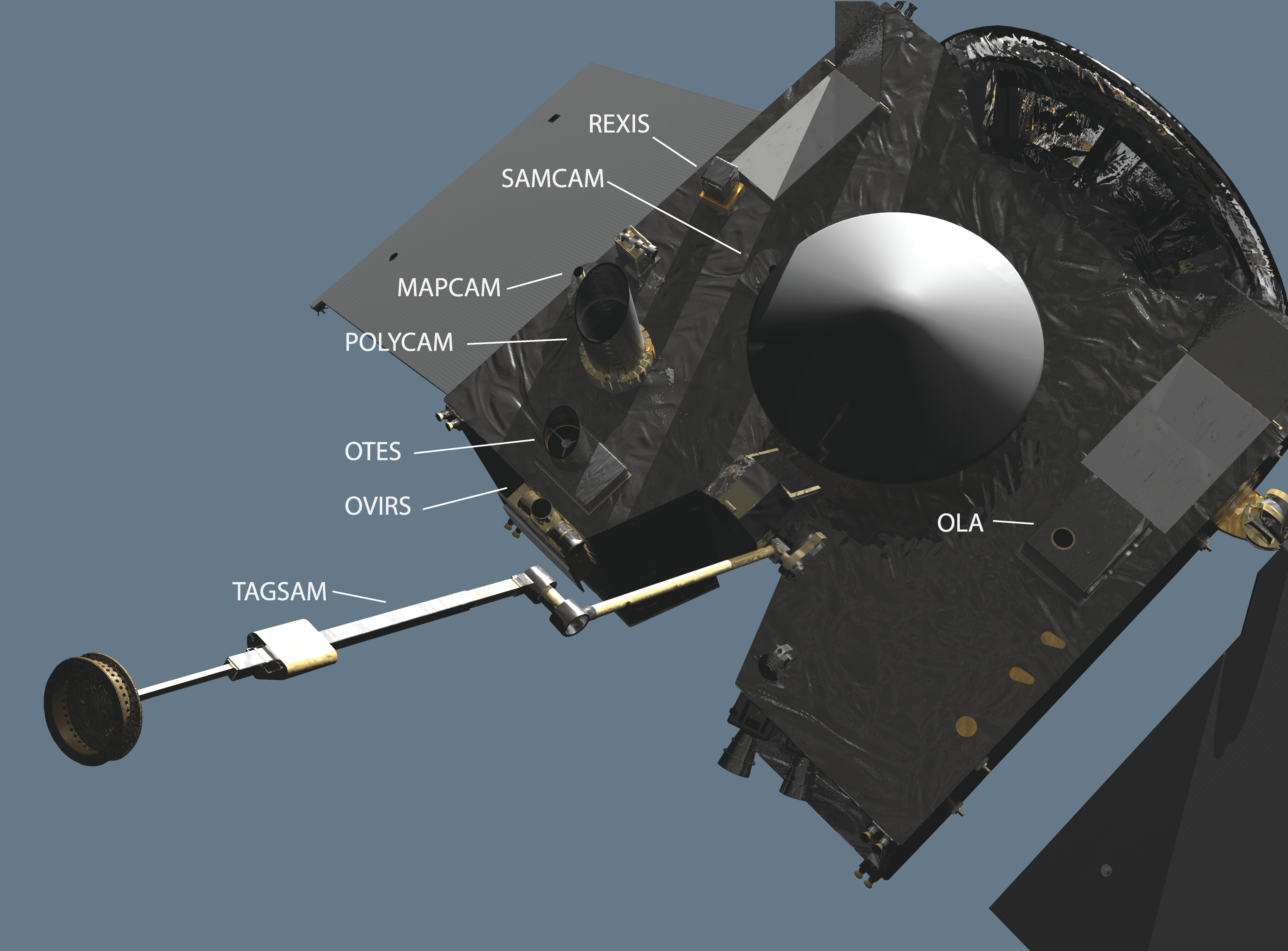
OSIRIS-REx instrument deck

- Dimensions: Length 2.4 m (7 ft 10 in), width 2.4 m (7 ft 10 in), height 3.15 m (10.3 ft)
- Width with solar arrays deployed: 6.17 m (20.2 ft)
- Power: Two solar arrays generate 1226 to 3000 Watts, depending on the spacecraft's distance from the Sun. Energy is stored in Li-ion batteries.
- Propulsion system: Based on a hydrazine monopropellant system developed for the Mars Reconnaissance Orbiter, carrying 1,230 kg (2,710 lb) of propellant and helium.
- The sample-return capsule reentered the Earth's atmosphere with a parachute assisted landing. The capsule with encased samples was retrieved from Earth's surface and is being studied, as was done with the Stardust mission.

== Instruments ==
In addition to its telecommunication equipment, the spacecraft carries a suite of instruments to image and analyze the asteroid on many wavelengths, and retrieve a physical sample to return to Earth. The Planetary Society coordinated a campaign to invite interested persons to have their names or artwork on the mission's spirit of exploration saved on a microchip carried in the spacecraft.

=== OCAMS ===
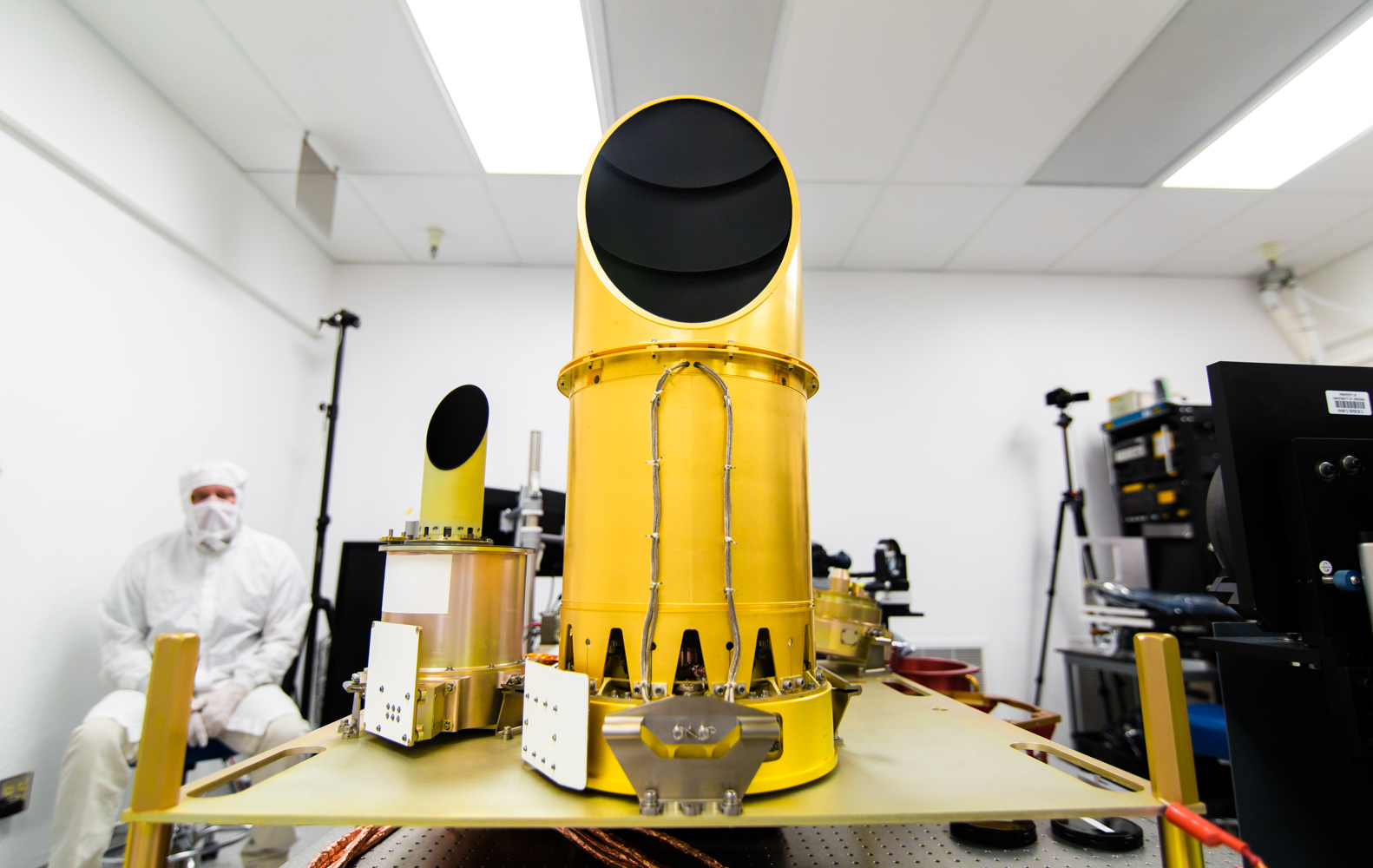
Imaging camera suite

The OSIRIS-REx Camera Suite (OCAMS) consists of the PolyCam, the MapCam, and the SamCam. Together, they acquire information on asteroid Bennu by providing global mapping, sample site reconnaissance and characterization, high-resolution imaging, and records of the sample acquisition.

- PolyCam, an 20 cm (7.9 in) telescope, acquired visible-light images with increasingly higher resolution on approach the asteroid and high-resolution surface images from orbit
- MapCam searches for satellites and outgassing plumes. It maps the asteroid in four blue, green, red and near infrared channels, and informs the model of Bennu's shape and provides high resolution imaging of the potential sample sites
- SamCam continuously documents the sample acquisitions

=== OVIRS ===
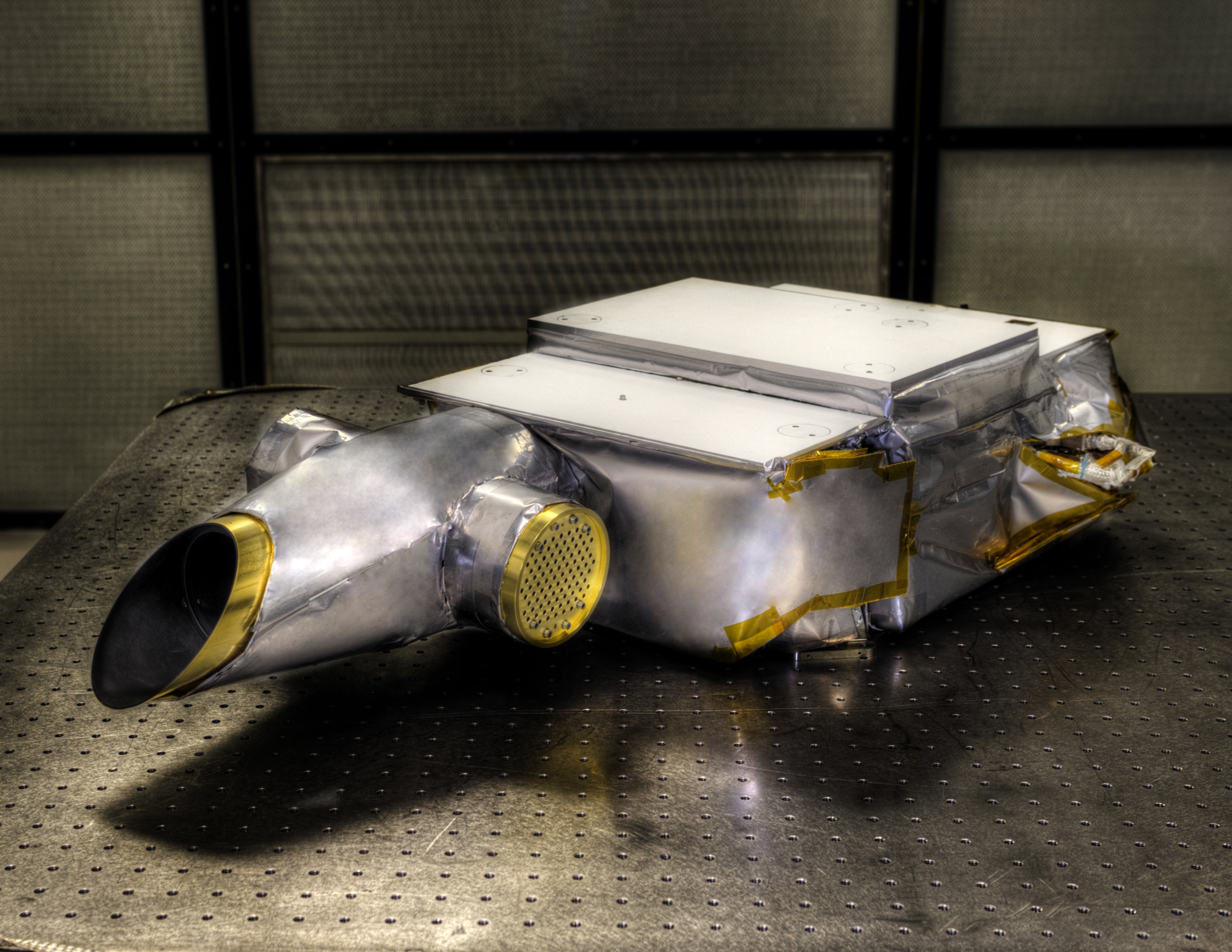
OVIRS

The OSIRIS-REx Visible and IR Spectrometer (OVIRS) is a spectrometer which maps minerals and organic substances on the asteroid's surface. It provides full-disc asteroid spectral data at 20 m resolution. It maps blue to near-infrared, 400–4300 nm, with a spectral resolution of 7.5–22 nm. This data was used in concert with OTES spectra to guide sample-site selection. The spectral ranges and resolving powers are sufficient to provide surface maps of carbonates, silicates, sulfates, oxides, adsorbed water and a wide range of organic compounds.

=== OTES ===
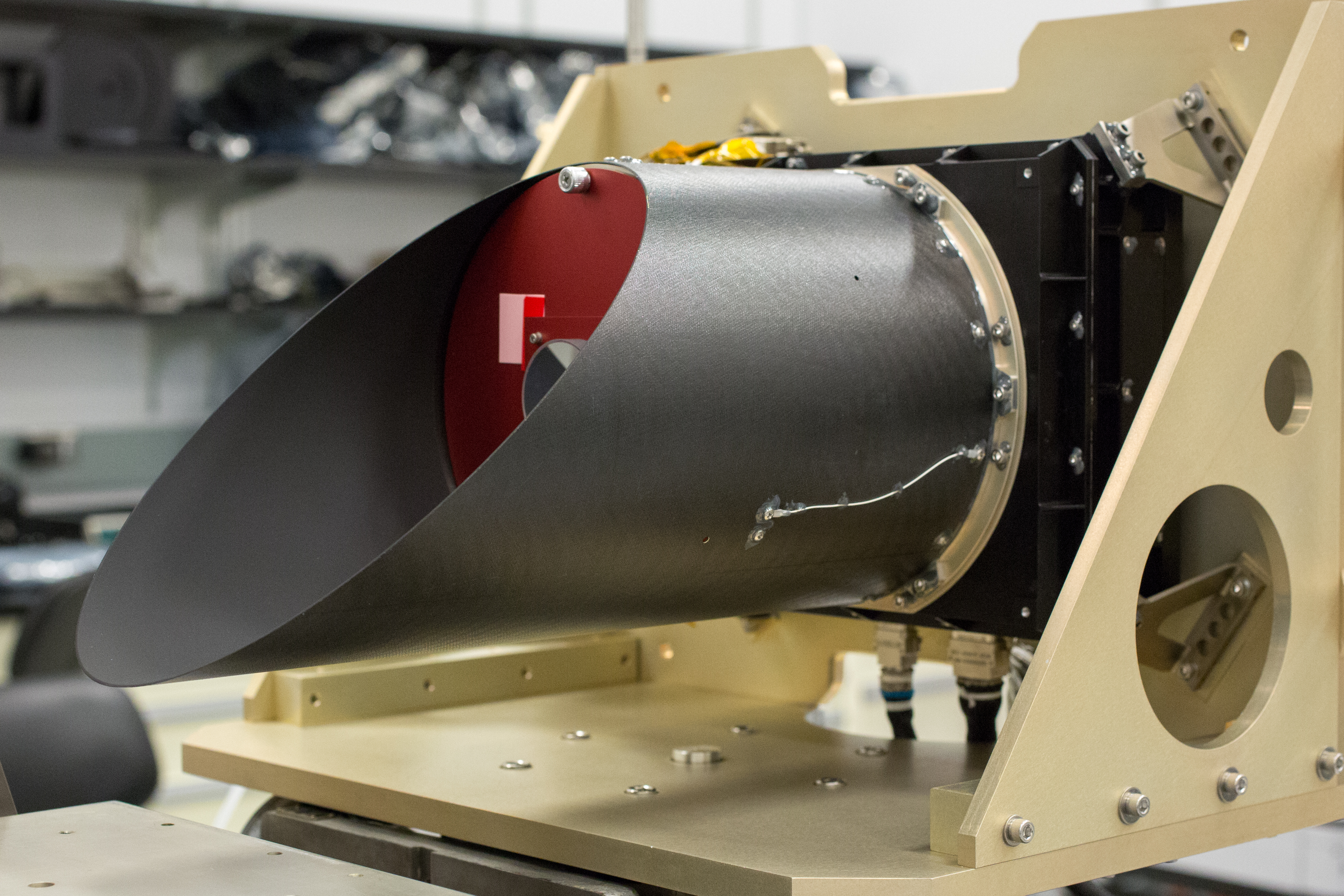
OTES

The OSIRIS-REx Thermal Emission Spectrometer (OTES) provides thermal emission spectral maps and local spectral information of candidate sample sites in the thermal infrared channel covering 4–50 μm, again to map mineral and organic substances. The wavelength range, spectral resolution, and radiometric performance are sufficient to resolve and identify silicates, carbonates, sulfates, phosphates, oxides, and hydroxide minerals. OTES is also used to measure the total thermal emission from Bennu in support of the requirement to measure emitted radiation globally.

Based on the performance of Mini-TES in the dusty surface environment of Mars, OTES was designed to be resilient to extreme dust contamination on the optical elements.

=== REXIS ===
The Regolith X-ray Imaging Spectrometer (REXIS) provided an X-ray spectroscopy map of Bennu to map element abundances. REXIS was a collaborative development by four groups within Massachusetts Institute of Technology (MIT) and Harvard University, with the potential to involve more than 100 students throughout the process. REXIS was based on flight heritage hardware, thereby minimizing elements of technical risk, schedule risk, and cost risk.

REXIS is a coded aperture soft X-ray (0.3–7.5 keV) telescope that images X-ray fluorescence line emission produced by the absorption of solar X-rays and the solar wind by elements in the regolith of Bennu leading to local X-ray emissions. Images were formed with 21 arcminute resolution (4.3 m spatial resolution at a distance of 700 m). Imaging was achieved by correlating the detected X-ray image with a 64×64 element random mask (1.536 mm pixels). REXIS stored data for each X-ray event to maximize data storage usage and minimize the risk. The pixels were addressed in 64×64 bins and the 0.3–7.5 keV range was covered by five broad bands and 11 narrow line bands. A 24-second resolution time tag was interleaved with the event data to account for Bennu rotation. Images were reconstructed on the ground after downlink of the event list. Images were formed simultaneously in 16 energy bands centered on the dominant lines of abundant surface elements from O-K (0.5 keV) to Fe-Kß (7 keV) as well the representative continuum. During orbital phase 5B, a 21-day orbit 700 m from the surface of Bennu, a total of at least 133 events/asteroid pixel/energy band were expected under 2 keV; enough to obtain significant constraints on element abundances at scales larger than 10 m.

On 11 November 2019, while observing the asteroid with REXIS, university students and researchers involved in the mission unexpectedly discovered an X-ray burst from a black hole named MAXI J0637-430 located 30,000 light-years away.

=== OLA ===
The OSIRIS-REx Laser Altimeter (OLA) is a scanning and lidar instrument that will provide high resolution topographical information throughout the mission. The information received by OLA creates global topographic maps of Bennu, local maps of candidate sample sites, ranging in support of other instruments, and support navigation and gravity analyses.

OLA scans the surface of Bennu at specific intervals to rapidly map the entire surface of the asteroid to achieve its primary objective of producing local and global topographic maps. The data collected by OLA will also be used to develop a control network relative to the center of mass of the asteroid and to enhance and refine gravitational studies of Bennu.

OLA has a single common receiver and two complementary transmitter assemblies that enhance the resolution of the information brought back. OLA's high-energy laser transmitter is used for ranging and mapping from 1 to 7.5 km (0.62 to 4.66 mi). The low-energy transmitter is used for ranging and imaging from 0.5 to 1 km (0.31 to 0.62 mi). The repetition rate of these transmitters sets the data acquisition rate of OLA. Laser pulses from both the low and high energy transmitters are directed onto a movable scanning mirror, which is co-aligned with the field of view of the receiver telescope limiting the effects of background solar radiation. Each pulse provides target range, azimuth, elevation, received intensity and a time-tag.

OLA was funded by the Canadian Space Agency (CSA) and was built by MDA at Brampton, Ontario, Canada. OLA was delivered for integration with the spacecraft on 17 November 2015. The lead instrument scientist of OLA is Michael Daly from York University.

=== TAGSAM ===
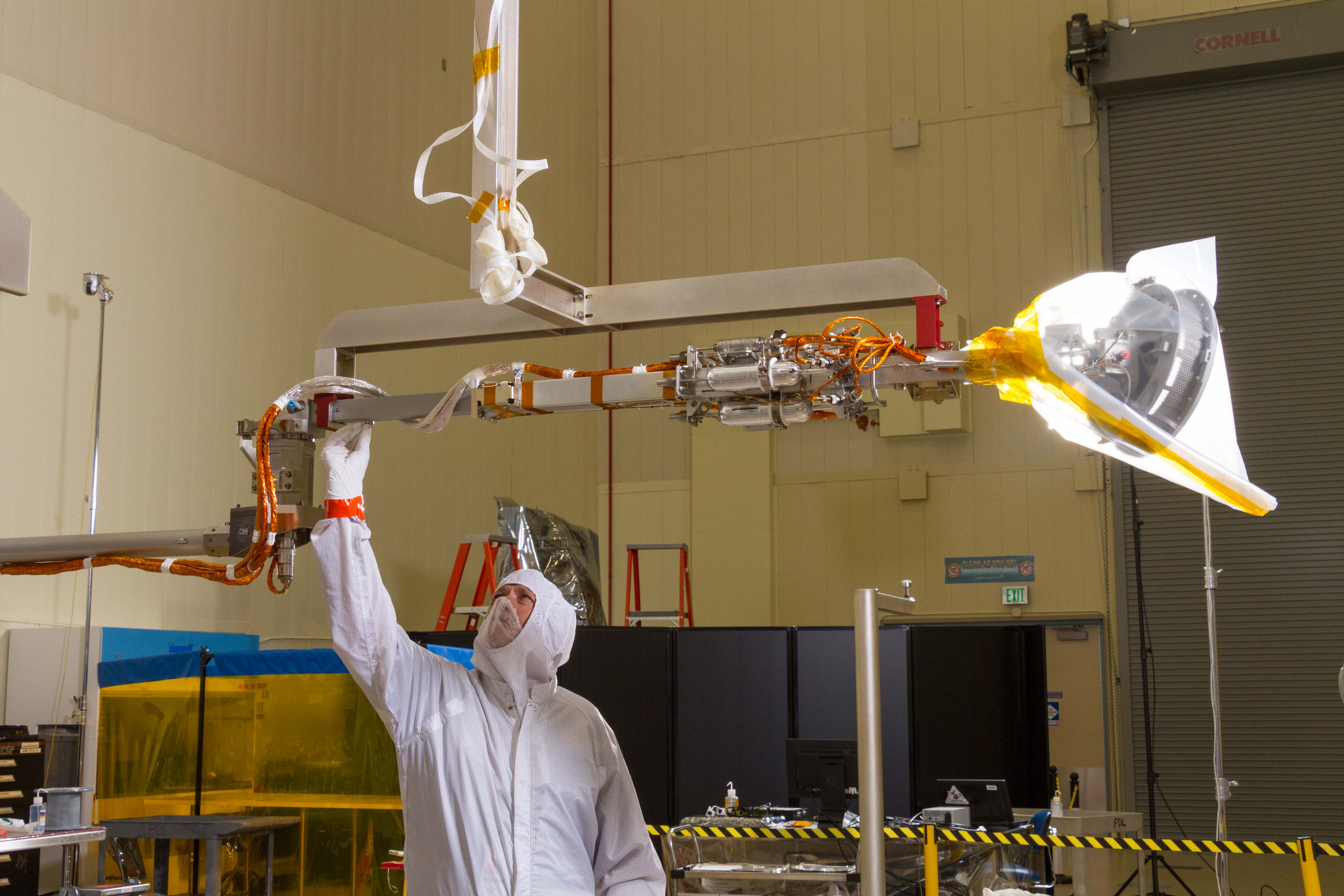
TAGSAM arm test before launch

The sample-return system, called Touch-And-Go Sample Acquisition Mechanism (TAGSAM), consists of a sampler head with an articulated 3.35 m (11.0 ft) arm. An on-board nitrogen source supports up to three separate sampling attempts to acquire at least 60 g (2.1 oz) of sample in all. The surface contact pads also collect fine-grained material.

Highlights of the TAGSAM instrument and technique include:

- Relative approach velocity of 10 cm/s (3.9 in/s)
- Contact within 25 m (82 ft) of selected location
- OCAMS documents sampling at 1 Hz
- Collect samples in less than five seconds, direct nitrogen (N_{2}) annular jet fluidizes regolith, surface-contact pad captures surface sample
- Verify bulk sample collection via spacecraft inertia change; surface sample by imaging sampler head
- Sampler head stored in sample-return capsule and returned to Earth

== Cooperation with JAXA ==
Hayabusa2 is a similar mission from JAXA to collect samples from near-Earth asteroid 162173 Ryugu. It arrived at the asteroid in June 2018, left in November 2019 after two successful sample collections, and returned to Earth in December 2020. The recovery capsule of Hayabusa2 re-entered Earth atmosphere and landed in Australia, as planned, on 5 December 2020. The sample contents were to be extensively analyzed, including water content, to provide clues on the initial formation of the asteroid. The main module of Hayabusa2 is performing a swing-by procedure to "push" it onward to its next destination, asteroid 1998KY26, by 2031. Because the two missions were similar and had overlapping timelines (OSIRIS-REx was still in the return phase), NASA and JAXA signed an agreement to collaborate on sample exchange and research. The two teams visited each other, with representatives from JAXA visiting the OSIRIS-REx Science Operations Center at the University of Arizona, and members of the OSIRIS-REx team traveling to Japan to meet with the Hayabusa2 team. The teams are sharing software, data, and techniques for analysis, and will eventually exchange portions of the samples that are returned to Earth.

== OSIRIS-REx II ==
OSIRIS-REx II was a 2012 mission concept to replicate the original spacecraft for a double mission, with the second vehicle collecting samples from the two moons of Mars, Phobos and Deimos. It was stated that this mission would be both the quickest and least expensive way to get samples from the moons. Mars I and II are now the aims of another mission, led by JAXA, called MMX, to be launched in 2026.

== Gallery ==
Narrated tour of Bennu's most prominent surface features, as seen by OSIRIS-REx

Effects of OSIRIS-REx sampling attempt on Bennu

First images of asteroid Bennu (August 2018)

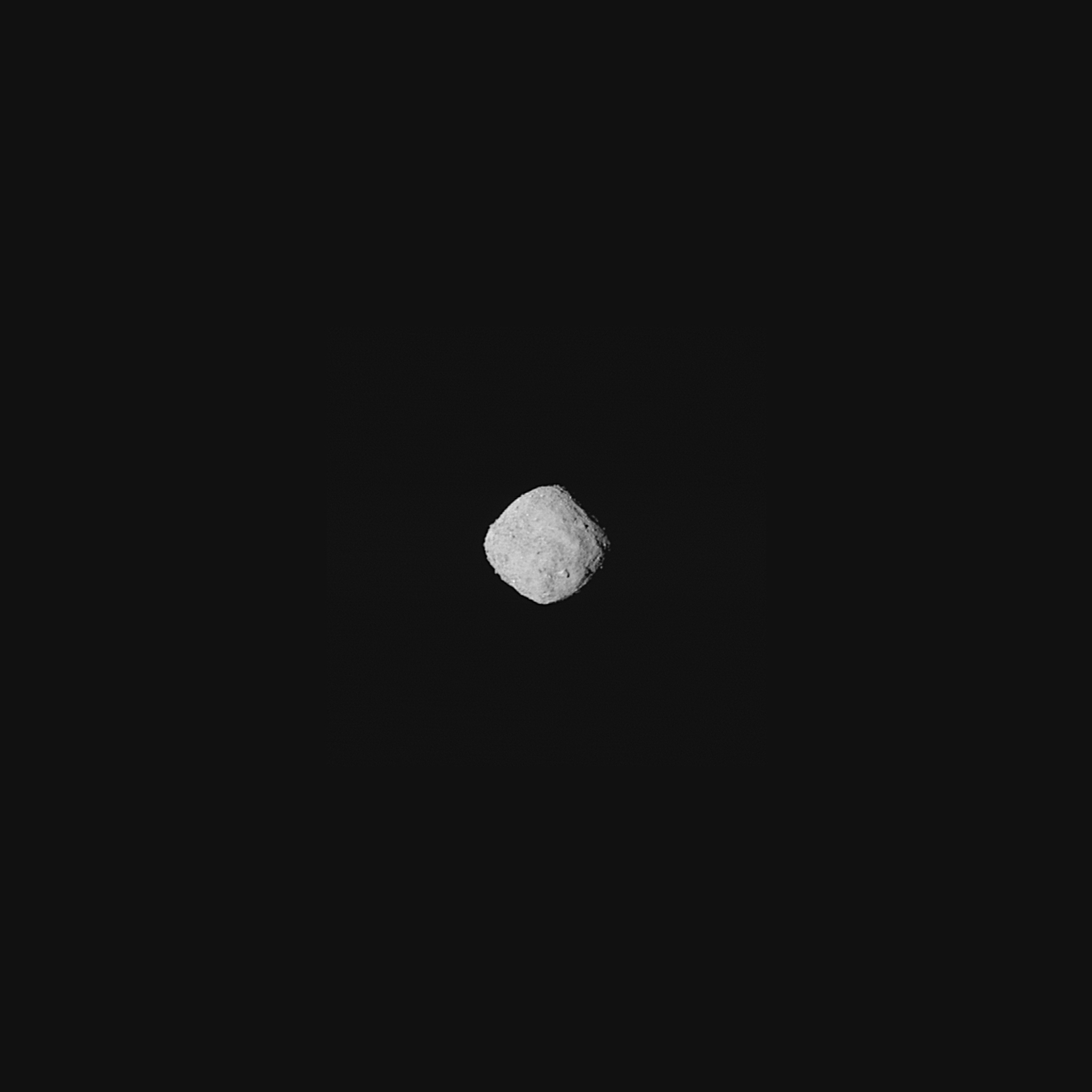
Asteroid Bennu from 330 km (210 mi) away (29 October 2018)

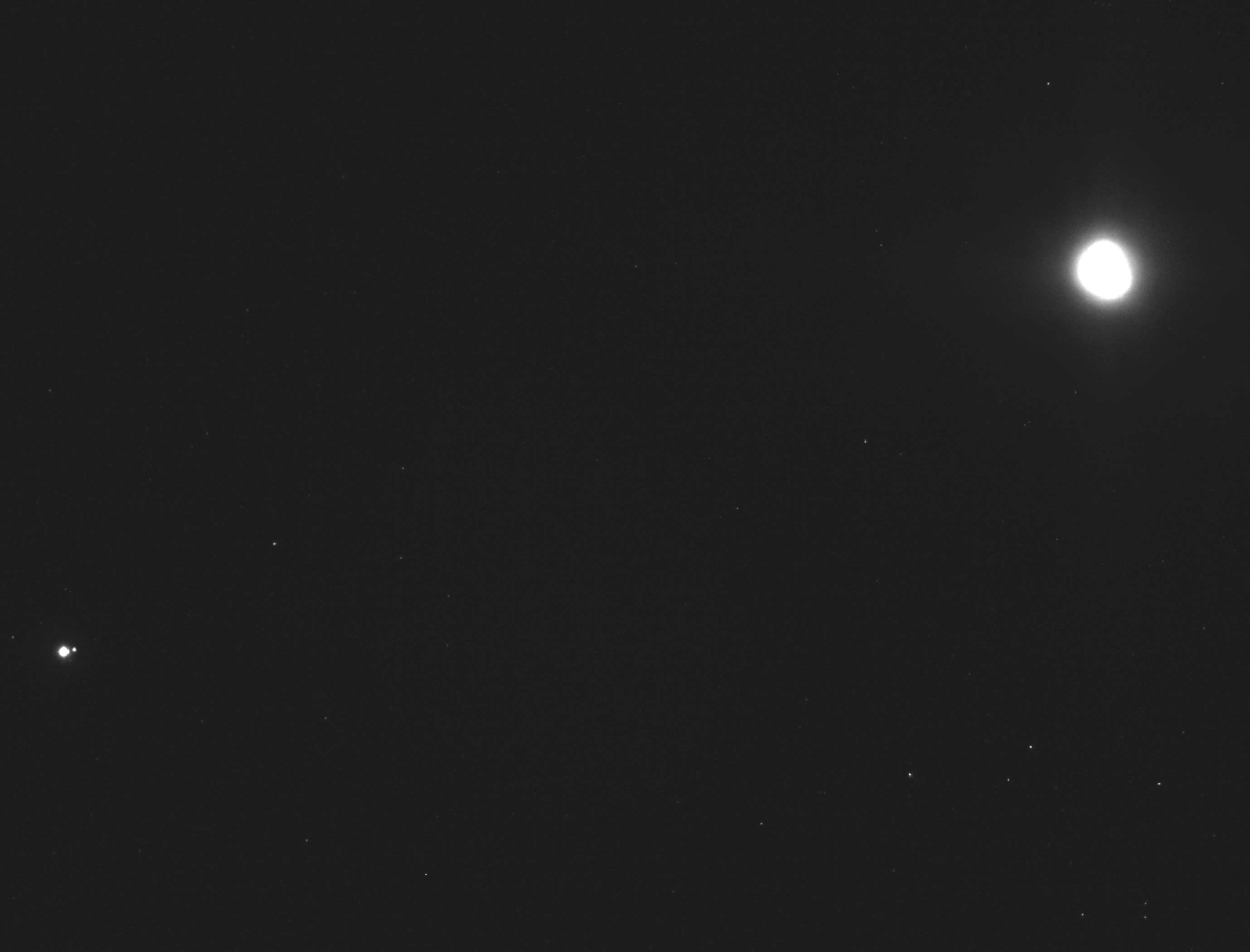
Earth-Moon (lower left) and asteroid Bennu (upper right) (December 2018)

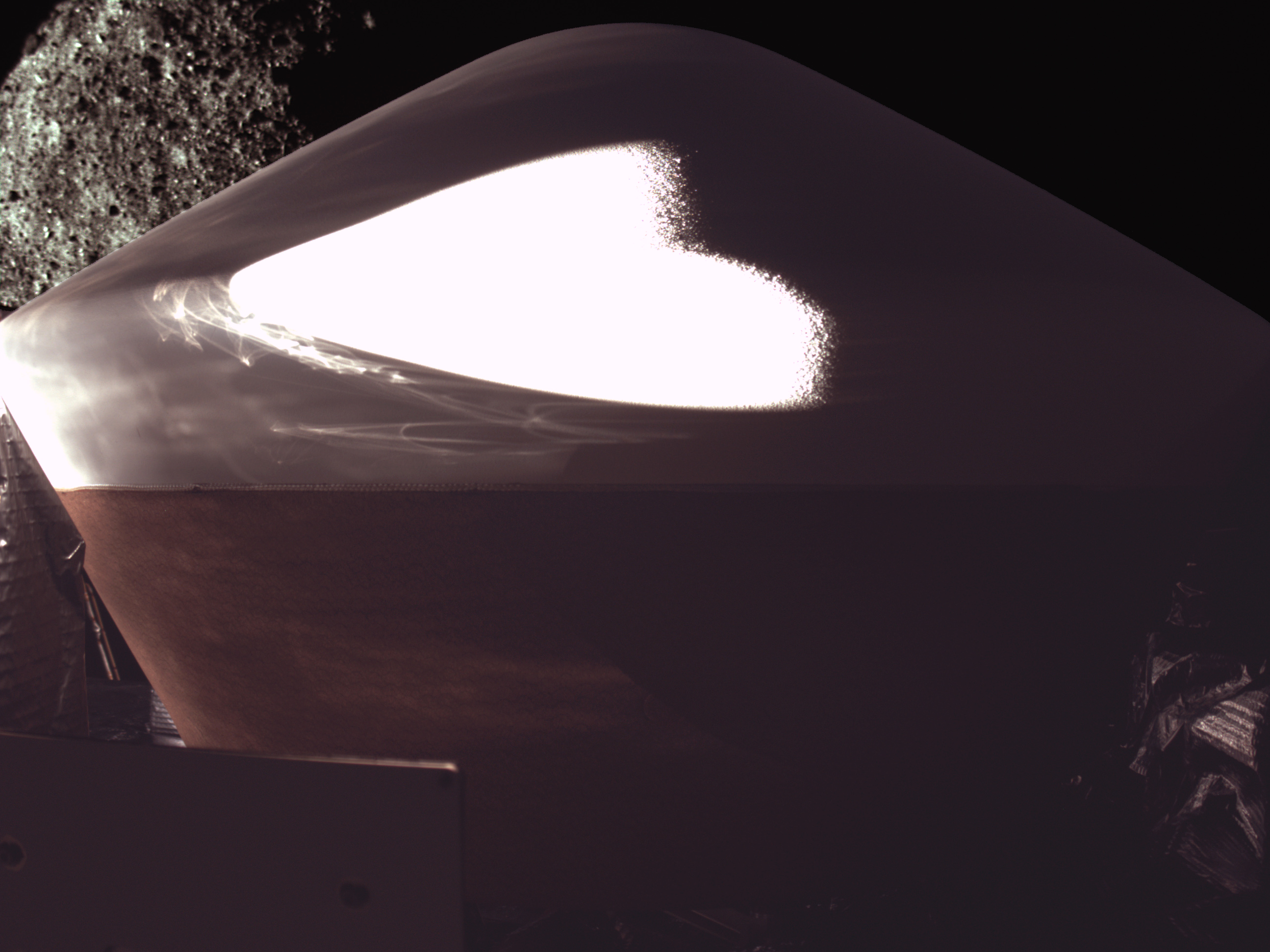
The Sample Return Capsule (SRC) with asteroid Bennu in the background (December 2019)

The "Nightingale" sample site pictured before and after the sampling maneuver

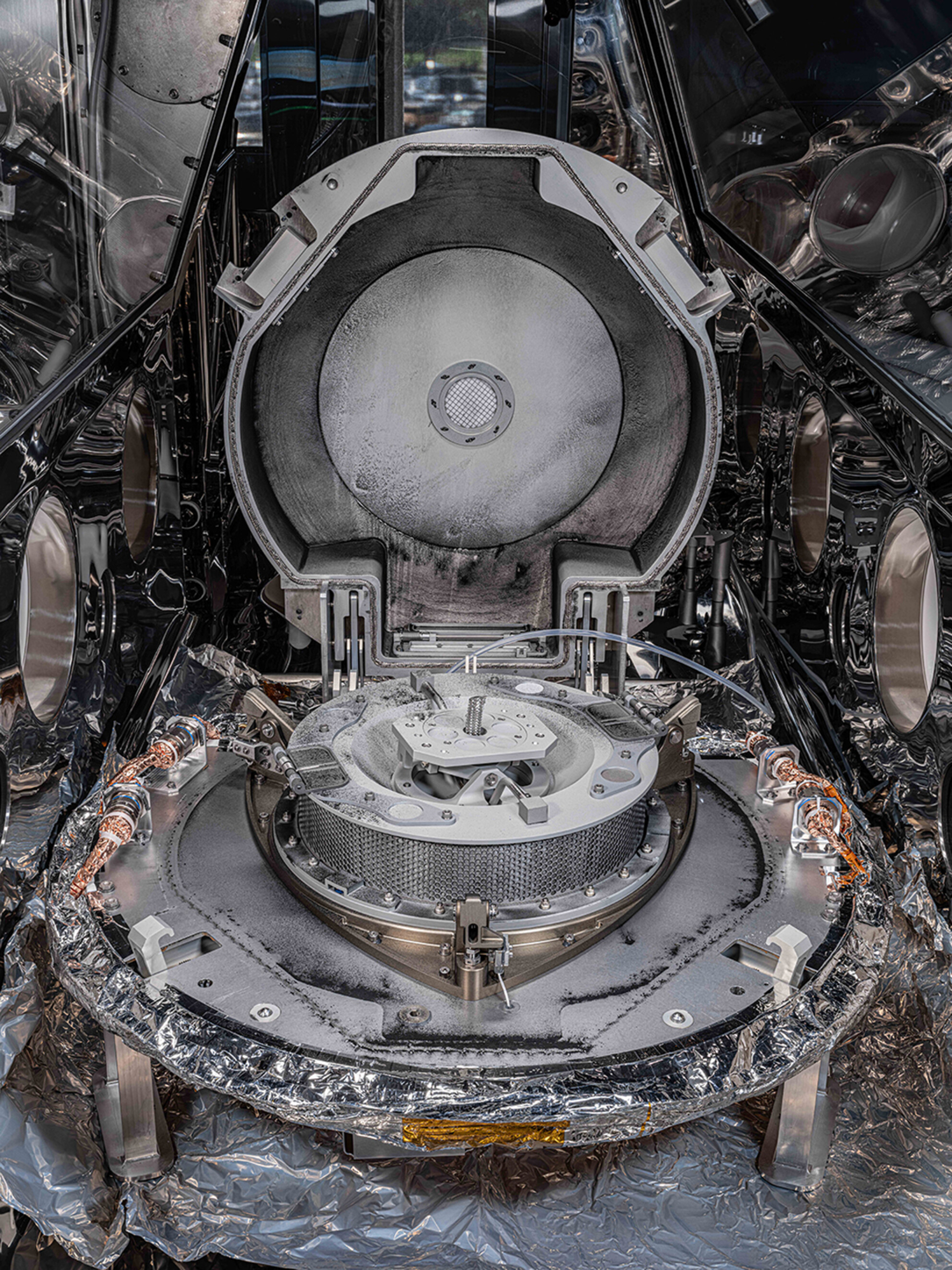
The opened return capsule

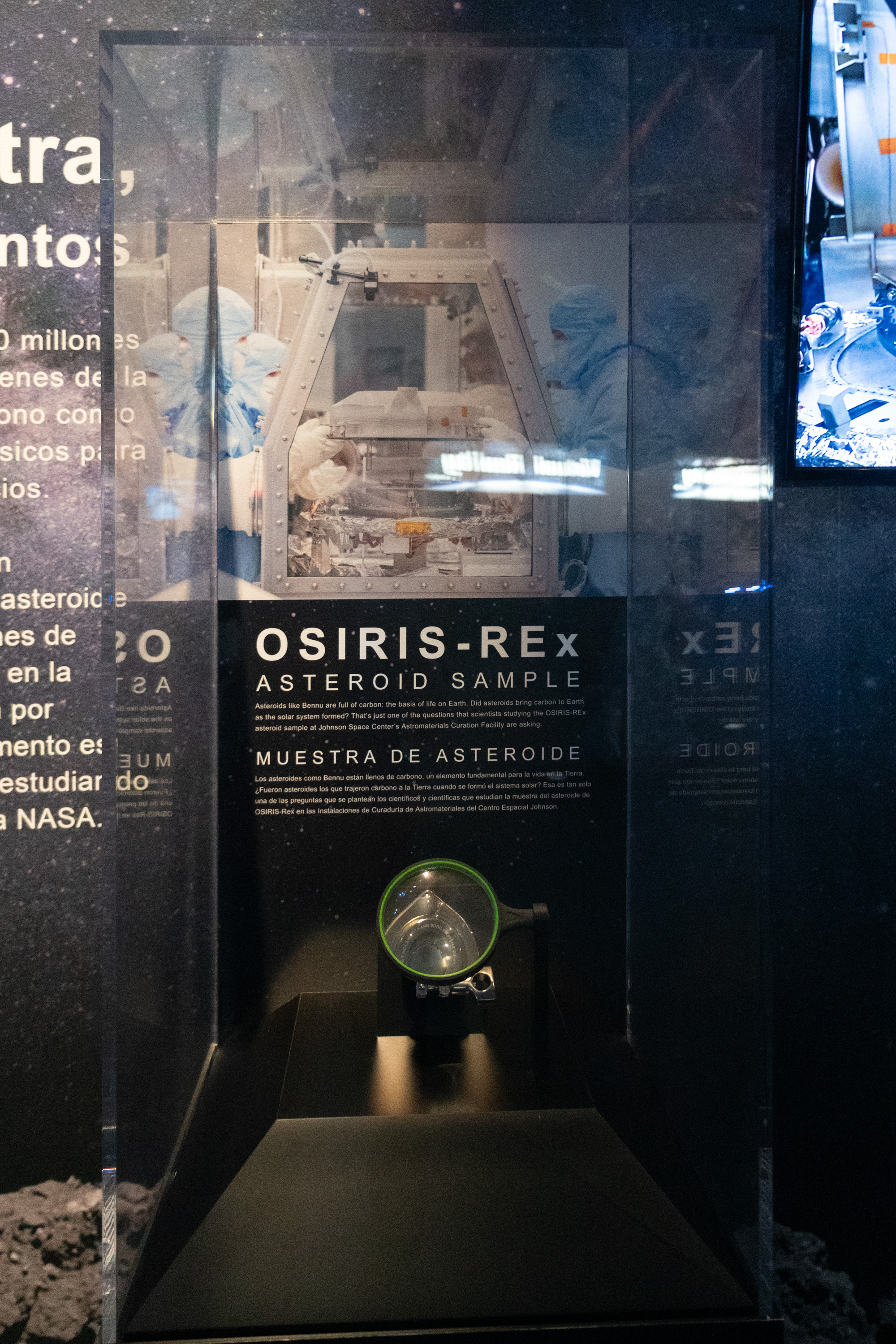
Sample being displayed at Space Center Houston

== See also ==
- Asteroidal water – Water and its precursors in asteroids
- Terminator orbit – Orbit about a small Solar System body
- List of minor planets and comets visited by spacecraft
