= Astromaterials Research and Exploration Science Directorate =

Physical science research facility at NASA's Johnson Space Center

The Astromaterials Research and Exploration Science (ARES) Directorate performs the physical science research at the Johnson Space Center (JSC). It serves as the JSC focus for support to the HQ Science Mission Directorate. ARES scientists and engineers also provide support to the human and robotic spaceflight programs with expertise in orbital debris modeling, analysis of micrometeoroid/orbital debris risks to spacecraft, image analysis and Earth observations. The responsibilities of ARES also include interaction with the Office of Safety and Mission Assurance and the Human Space Flight Programs. They perform research in Earth, planetary, and space sciences and have curatorial responsibility for all NASA-held extraterrestrial samples.

The ARES Directorate recently added a Wordpress Blog that will allow social media Twitter updates to new research and Laboratory discoveries. Posts will also be made by the Expedition Earth and Beyond Education Program that will be adding their classroom connection events to the NASA ARES YouTube page.

== Earth Science and Remote Sensing Unit ==
The Earth Science and Remote Sensing Unit (ESRS) is a remote sensing ground unit of NASA. It is part of NASA's Astromaterials Research and Exploration Science Directorate. It works with the United States Geological Survey (USGS) and NASA's Earth Science Disaster Program.
