= Fullo =

Laundry worker in the Roman empire

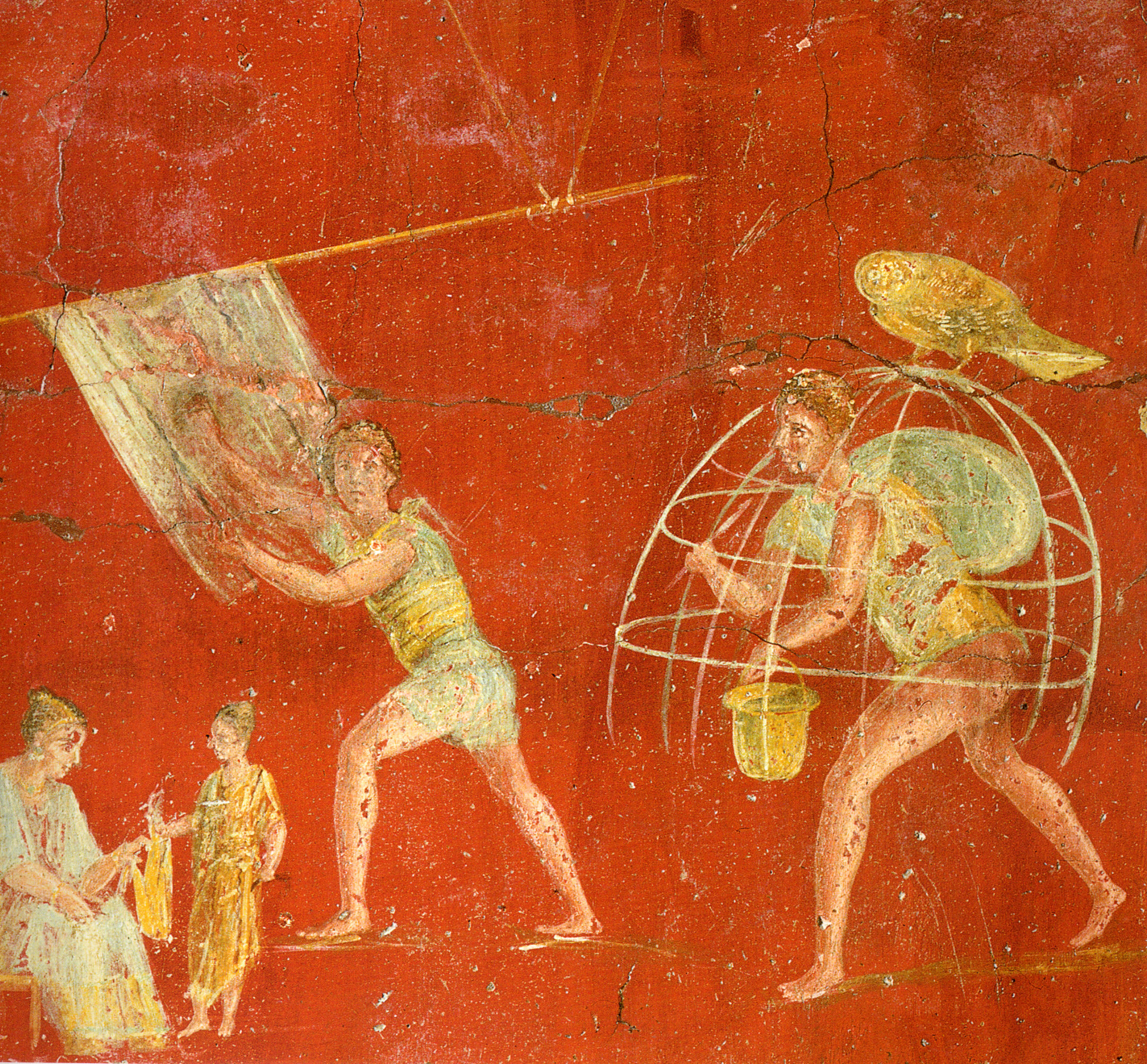
Mural painting from fullonica VI 8, 20.21.2 at Pompeii, now in the National museum of Naples.

A fullo was a Roman fuller or laundry worker (plural: fullones), known from many inscriptions from Italy and the western half of the Roman Empire and references in Latin literature, e.g. by Plautus, Martialis and Pliny the Elder. A fullo worked in a fullery or fullonica. There is also evidence that fullones dealt with cloth straight from the loom, though this has been doubted by some modern scholars. In some large farms, fulleries were built where slaves were used to clean the cloth. In several Roman cities, the workshops of fullones have been found. The most important examples are in Ostia and Pompeii, but fullonicae also have been found in Delos, Florence, Fréjus and near Forlì: in the Archaeological Museum of Forlì, there is an ancient relief with a fullery view. While the small workshops at Delos go back to the 1st century BC, those in Pompeii date from the 1st century AD and the establishments in Ostia and Florence were built during the reign of the Emperors Trajan and Hadrian.

== The fulling process ==
Fulling consisted of three main phases. These include soaping, rinsing and finishing.

=== Soaping ===
Clothes were treated in small tubs standing in niches surrounded by low walls. The fuller stood with his feet in the tub filled with water and a mixture of alkaline chemicals (sometimes including ammonia derived from urine) and trampled the cloth, scrubbed it, and wrung it out. The aim of this treatment was to apply the chemical agents to the cloth so that they could do their work - which was the dissolving of greases and fats. The installations in which this treatment was done are usually referred to as 'treading stalls', 'fulling stalls' or, erroneously, 'saltus fullonicus' and are typical for fulling workshops and are often used by archaeologists to identify fullonicae in the archaeological remains.

=== Rinsing ===
After the clothes were soaped in the chemicals, the dirt that they had dissolved had to be washed out. This happened with fresh water in a complex of large basins that often were connected to the urban water supply. The typical rinsing complex consisted of three or four basins that were connected to each other: the fresh water entered on one side of the complex, the dirty water left it on the other side. Clothes followed the opposite direction of the water and went from the basin with the dirtiest water to the basin with the cleanest water.

=== Finishing ===
The last phase of the fulling process consisted of a variety of treatments. The precise sequence is not exactly known and may have varied, depending on the nature of the workshop and the demands of customers.

- The cloth was often brushed, with the thistle of plants, and sheared, as is indicated from finds in some Pompeian fullonicae.
- Sometimes, clothes were also treated with sulfur. The cloth was then hung on a basket woven structure called a viminea cavea. This structure can be seen in the figure above. Fullones added sulfur to white cloths to maintain the color, knowing that sulfur was volatile enough to destroy colors.
- The clothes were also pressed in a screw press. Remains of such presses have been found at Pompeii and Herculaneum, and a depiction was found in a Pompeian fullonica and is now displayed in the National Museum in Naples.

== The fullo and the state ==
According to Pliny the Elder, the work of fullones was taken very seriously. C. Flaminius and L. Aemilius wrote the proper method for fullones to practice in the Metilian Law. The law stressed the use of Cimolian earth (similar to Fuller's earth) to brighten and freshen colors that have faded due to sulfur. On the other hand, the law stated that the mineral saxum was useful for white clothing but harmful to colors.

Fullones were legally responsible for the clothes they were washing. Fullones were subject to penalties if they returned the wrong clothes or damaged the clothes. Furthermore, clothes once washed were considered devalued. In fact, Emperor Elagabalus said that he would not touch linen that had been washed because such cloth had already been devalued. Still, the profession of a fullo was highly reputable. Fullones in Ostia created their own guild, called Corpus Fontanorum. The fuller guild of Pompeii dedicated a statue to Eumachia in the Building of Eumachia on the Pompeian Forum. The connection between Eumachia and the Fullers is not clear, but the building may have been used for selling cloth, although it could have been a market for anything.

These Roman launderers worshipped the goddess Minerva, as did many other professions. Therefore, the fullones were particularly involved with Quinquatrus, Minerva’s main feast held on March 19. The feast often took place in a fullo's workshops. Fullones are associated with representations of owls, such as in Roman graffiti found in Pompeii. There has been a lively scholarly debate whether the association is due to the owl of Minerva or due to Varro's proverbial phrase: "men fear him worse than the fuller fears the screech owl". Sat. Men. 86. 4

== Archaeological remains of fullonicae ==
Thus far, eleven fullonicae are known at Pompeii, the most famous of which is the Fullonica of Stephanus along the Via dell'Abbondanza, where the remains of the fulling workshop can be seen in the back of the house. Most other workshops are rather small and are hard to recognize. Recent fieldwork by the Radboud University Nijmegen has resulted in the definitive identification of three previously unknown fulling workshops

At Ostia, three extremely large fullonicae have been excavated along with two smaller ones. Best preserved is the large fullonica of the Via degli Augustali.

An important recent development is the excavation of an exceptionally large fulling workshop in Casal Bertone, in Rome. This workshop is three times as large as the large Ostian fullonicae and was discovered during a rescue excavation for the construction of the high-speed railway from Roma Tiburtina to Naples. It was situated outside the ancient city in an area that also functioned as a necropolis. This workshop is probably the largest workshop from antiquity.

== See also ==
- Washerwoman or laundress
- Dhobi, an Indian laundry worker
- Lavoir, a sheltered place to do laundry
