= 101955 Bennu =

Carbonaceous Apollo asteroid

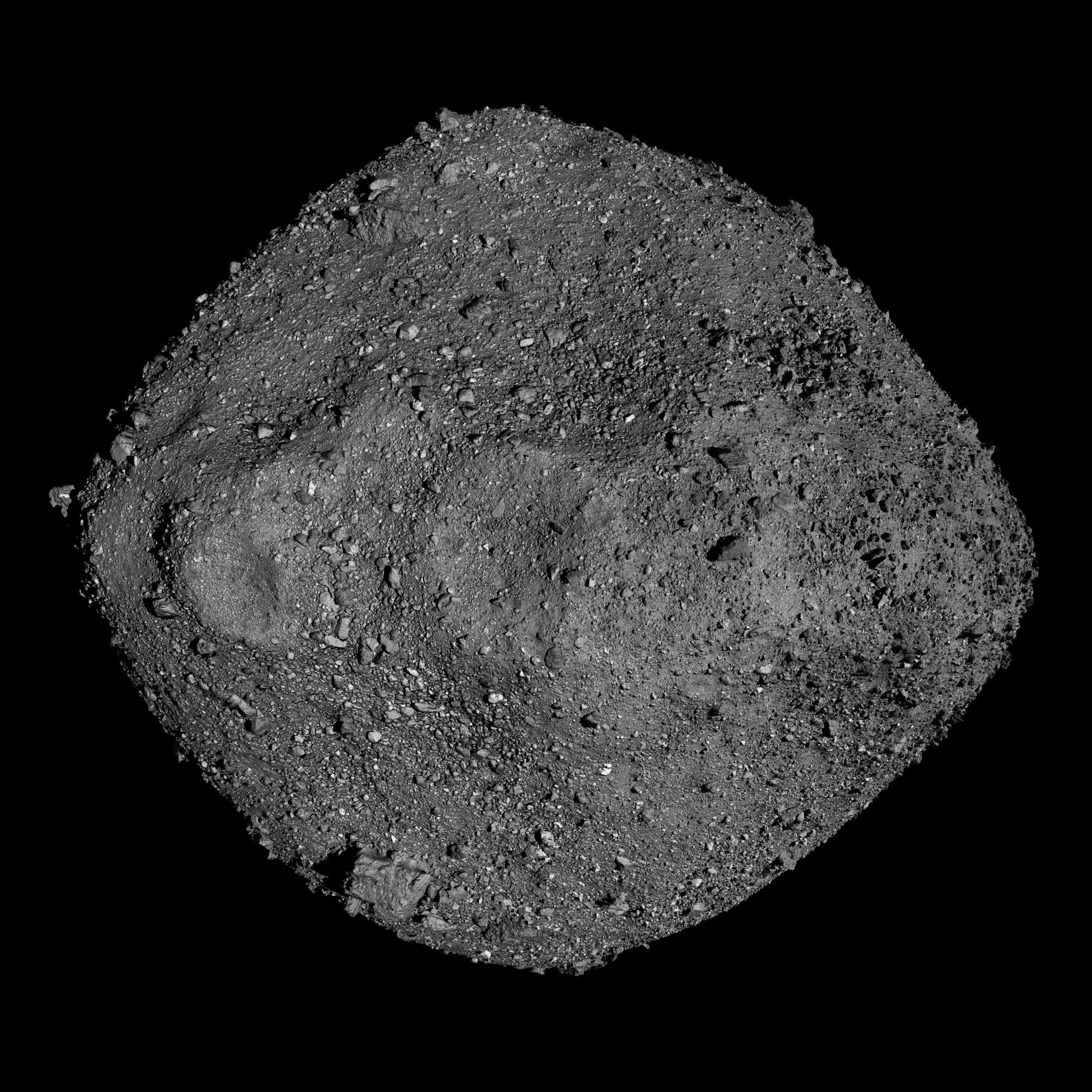
- Mosaic image of Bennu after two years of observation by OSIRIS-REx

Discovery
- Discovered by: LINEAR
- Discovery site: Lincoln Lab's ETS
- Discovery date: 11 September 1999

Designations
- Pronunciation: /ˈbɛnuː/
- Named after: Bennu
- Alternative designations: 1999 RQ_{36}
- Minor planet category: Apollo · NEO · PHA · risk listed

Orbital characteristics
- Epoch 1 January 2011 (JD 2455562.5)
- Uncertainty parameter 0
- Observation arc: 21.06 yr (7693 days)
- Aphelion: 1.3559 au (202.84 Gm)
- Perihelion: 0.8969 au (134.17 Gm)
- Semi-major axis: 1.1264 au (168.51 Gm)
- Eccentricity: 0.2038
- Orbital period (sidereal): 1.1955 yr (436.65 d)
- Average orbital speed: 28.0 km/s (63,000 mph)
- Mean anomaly: 101.7039°
- Mean motion: 0° 49^{m} 28.056^{s} / day
- Inclination: 6.0349°
- Longitude of ascending node: 2.0609°
- Argument of perihelion: 66.2231°
- Earth MOID: 0.0032228 au (482,120 km)
- Venus MOID: 0.194 au (29,000,000 km)
- Mars MOID: 0.168 au (25,100,000 km)
- Jupiter MOID: 3.877 au (580.0 Gm)
- T_{Jupiter}: 5.525

Proper orbital elements
- Proper eccentricity: 0.21145
- Proper inclination: 5.0415°
- Proper mean motion: 301.1345 deg / yr
- Proper orbital period: 1.19548 yr (436.649 d)

Physical characteristics
- Dimensions: 565 m × 535 m × 508 m (1854 ft × 1755 ft × 1667 ft)
- Mean radius: 245.03±0.08 m (804±0.262 ft)
- Equatorial radius: 282.37±0.06 m (926.4±0.197 ft)
- Polar radius: 249.25±0.06 m (817.74±0.197 ft)
- Surface area: 0.782±0.004 km^{2} (0.302±0.002 mi^{2})
- Volume: 0.0615±0.0001 km^{3}
- Mass: (7.329±0.009)×10^{10} kg
- Mean density: 1.190±0.013 g/cm^{3}
- Equatorial surface gravity: 6.27 micro-g (61.5 μm/s^{2})
- Equatorial escape velocity: 20 cm/s
- Synodic rotation period: 4.296057±0.000002 h
- Axial tilt: 177.6±0.11°
- North pole right ascension: +85.65±0.12°
- North pole declination: −60.17±0.09°
- Geometric albedo: 0.044±0.002
| Surface temp. | min | mean | max |
|---|---|---|---|
| Kelvin | 236 | 259 | 279 |
| Fahrenheit | -34.6 | 6.8 | 42.8 |
| Celsius | -37 | -14 | 6 |
- Spectral type: B F
- Absolute magnitude (H): 20.9

101955 Bennu (provisional designation 1999 RQ_{36}) is a carbonaceous asteroid in the Apollo group, discovered by the LINEAR Project on 11 September 1999. It is a potentially hazardous object that is listed on the Sentry Risk Table and has the second highest cumulative rating on the Palermo scale. It has a cumulative chance of around 1 in 1,750 of impacting Earth between 2178 and 2290 with the greatest risk being on 24 September 2182. It is named after Bennu, the ancient Egyptian mythological bird associated with the Sun, creation, and rebirth.

101955 Bennu has a mean diameter of 490 m (1,610 ft; 0.30 mi) and has been observed extensively by the Arecibo Observatory planetary radar and the Goldstone Deep Space Network.

Bennu was the target of the OSIRIS-REx mission that returned samples of the asteroid to Earth. The spacecraft, launched in September 2016, arrived at the asteroid two years later and mapped its surface in detail, seeking potential sample collection sites. Analysis of the orbits allowed calculation of Bennu's mass and its distribution. In October 2020, OSIRIS-REx briefly touched down and collected a sample of the asteroid's surface. A capsule containing the sample was returned and landed on Earth in September 2023, with distribution and analysis of the sample ongoing. On 15 May 2024, an overview of preliminary analytical studies on the returned samples was reported.

== Discovery and observation ==
Series of Goldstone radar images in 1999 showing Bennu's rotation

Bennu was discovered on 11 September 1999 during a Near-Earth asteroid survey by the Lincoln Near-Earth Asteroid Research (LINEAR). The asteroid was given the provisional designation 1999 RQ_{36} and classified as a near-Earth asteroid. Bennu was observed extensively by the Arecibo Observatory and the Goldstone Deep Space Network using radar imaging as Bennu closely approached Earth on 23 September 1999.

=== Naming ===
The name Bennu was selected from more than eight thousand student entries from dozens of countries around the world who entered a "Name that Asteroid!" contest run by the University of Arizona, The Planetary Society, and the LINEAR Project in 2012. Third-grade student Michael Puzio from North Carolina proposed the name in reference to the Egyptian mythological bird Bennu. To Puzio, the OSIRIS-REx spacecraft with its extended TAGSAM arm resembled the Egyptian deity, which is typically depicted as a heron.

Its features are named after birds and bird-like creatures in mythology.

== Physical characteristics ==
Animation of Bennu rotating, imaged by OSIRIS-REx in December 2018.

Bennu has a roughly spheroidal shape, resembling a spinning top. Bennu's axis of rotation is tilted 178 degrees to its orbit; the direction of rotation about its axis is retrograde with respect to its orbit. While the initial ground based radar observations indicated that Bennu had a fairly smooth shape with one prominent 10–20 m boulder on its surface, high resolution data obtained by OSIRIS-REx revealed that the surface is much rougher with more than 200 boulders larger than 10 m on the surface, the largest of which is 58 m across. The boulders contain veins of high albedo carbonate minerals believed to have formed prior to the formation of the asteroid due to hot water channels on the much larger parent body. The veins range from 3 to 15 centimeters wide, and can be over one meter in length, much bigger than carbonate veins seen in meteorites.

An analysis published in 2026 of "spacecraft observations revealed that Bennu is blanketed by boulders of differing physical properties" and implying "cracks in rocks resulting from geological processes within the parent body or, more recently, micrometeoroid impacts and thermal fatigue".

There is a well-defined ridge along the equator of Bennu. The presence of this ridge suggests that fine-grained regolith particles have accumulated in this area, possibly because of its low gravity and fast rotation (about once every 4.3 hours). Observation by the OSIRIS-REx spacecraft has shown that Bennu is rotating faster over time. This change in Bennu's rotation is caused by the Yarkovsky–O'Keefe–Radzievskii–Paddack effect. Due to the uneven emission of thermal radiation from its surface as Bennu rotates in sunlight, the rotation period of Bennu decreases by about 1 second every 100 years.

Observations of this minor planet by the Spitzer Space Telescope in 2007 gave an effective diameter of 484±10 m, which is in line with other studies. It has a low visible geometric albedo of 0.046±0.005. The thermal inertia was measured and found to vary by approximately 19% during each rotational period. It was based on this observation that scientists (incorrectly) estimated a moderate regolith grain size, ranging from several millimeters up to a centimeter, evenly distributed. No emission from a potential dust coma has been detected around Bennu, which puts a limit of 10^{6} g of dust within a radius of 4750 km.

Astrometric observations between 1999 and 2013 have demonstrated that 101955 Bennu is influenced by the Yarkovsky effect, causing the semimajor axis of its orbit to drift on average by 284±1.5 meters/year. Analysis of the gravitational and thermal effects has given a bulk density of ρ = 1190±13 kg/m^{3}, which is only slightly denser than water. Therefore, the predicted macroporosity is 40±10%, suggesting the interior has a rubble pile structure or even hollows. The estimated mass is (7.329±0.009)×10^{10} kg. The sample of Bennu revealed that some of the makings of living things are present on Bennu.

=== Photometry and spectroscopy ===
Photometric observations of Bennu in 2005 yielded a synodic rotation period of 4.2905±0.0065 h. It has a B-type classification, which is a sub-category of carbonaceous asteroids. Polarimetric observations show that Bennu belongs to the rare F subclass of carbonaceous asteroids, which is usually associated with cometary features. Measurements over a range of phase angles showed a phase function slope of 0.040 magnitudes per degree, which is similar to other near-Earth asteroids with low albedo.

Before OSIRIS-REx, spectroscopy indicated a correspondence with the CI and/or CM carbonaceous chondrite meteorites, including carbonaceous-chondrite mineral magnetite. Magnetite, a spectrally prominent water product but destroyed by heat, is an important proxy of astronomers including OSIRIS-REx staff.

=== Water ===
According to Dante Lauretta, OSIRIS-REx Principal Investigator, "Bennu appears to be a very water-rich target, and water is the most interesting and perhaps the most lucrative commodity that you would mine from an asteroid".

Predicted beforehand, Dante Lauretta (University of Arizona) reiterates that Bennu is water-rich already detectable while OSIRIS-REx was still technically in approach.

Preliminary spectroscopic surveys of the asteroid's surface by OSIRIS-REx confirmed magnetite and the meteorite-asteroid linkage, dominated by phyllosilicates. Phyllosilicates, among others, hold water. Bennu's water spectra were detectable on approach, reviewed by outside scientists, then confirmed from orbit.

OSIRIS-REx observations have resulted in a (self-styled) conservative estimate of about 7 × 10^{8} kg water in one form alone, neglecting additional forms. This is a water content of ~1 wt.%, and potentially much more. In turn this suggests transient pockets of water beneath Bennu's regolith. The surficial water may be lost from the collected samples. However, if the sample return capsule maintains low temperatures, the largest (centimeter-scale) fragments may contain measurable quantities of adsorbed water, and some fraction of Bennu's ammonium compounds. A separate estimate, including other forms of water storage, is 6.2 wt%.

In 2023, NASA and university sample facilities were preparing to secure, study, and curate the sample, predicted to be rich in water and organic compounds. The German SAL (Sample Analysis Laboratory) was also preparing to receive cosmochemical water from Ryugu, Bennu, and other airless bodies.

=== Activity ===
Bennu is an active asteroid, sporadically emitting plumes of particles and rocks as large as 10 cm (3.9 in) (not dust, defined as tens of micrometers). Scientists hypothesize the releases may be caused by thermal fracturing, volatile release through dehydration of phyllosilicates, pockets of subsurface water, and/or meteoroid impacts.

Before the arrival of OSIRIS-REx, Bennu had displayed polarization consistent with Comet Hale-Bopp and 3200 Phaethon, a rock comet. Bennu, Phaethon, and inactive Manx comets are examples of active asteroids. B-type asteroids displaying a blue color in particular, may be dormant comets, similar to Ryugu but at an earlier stage.

Asteroid Bennu ejecting particles

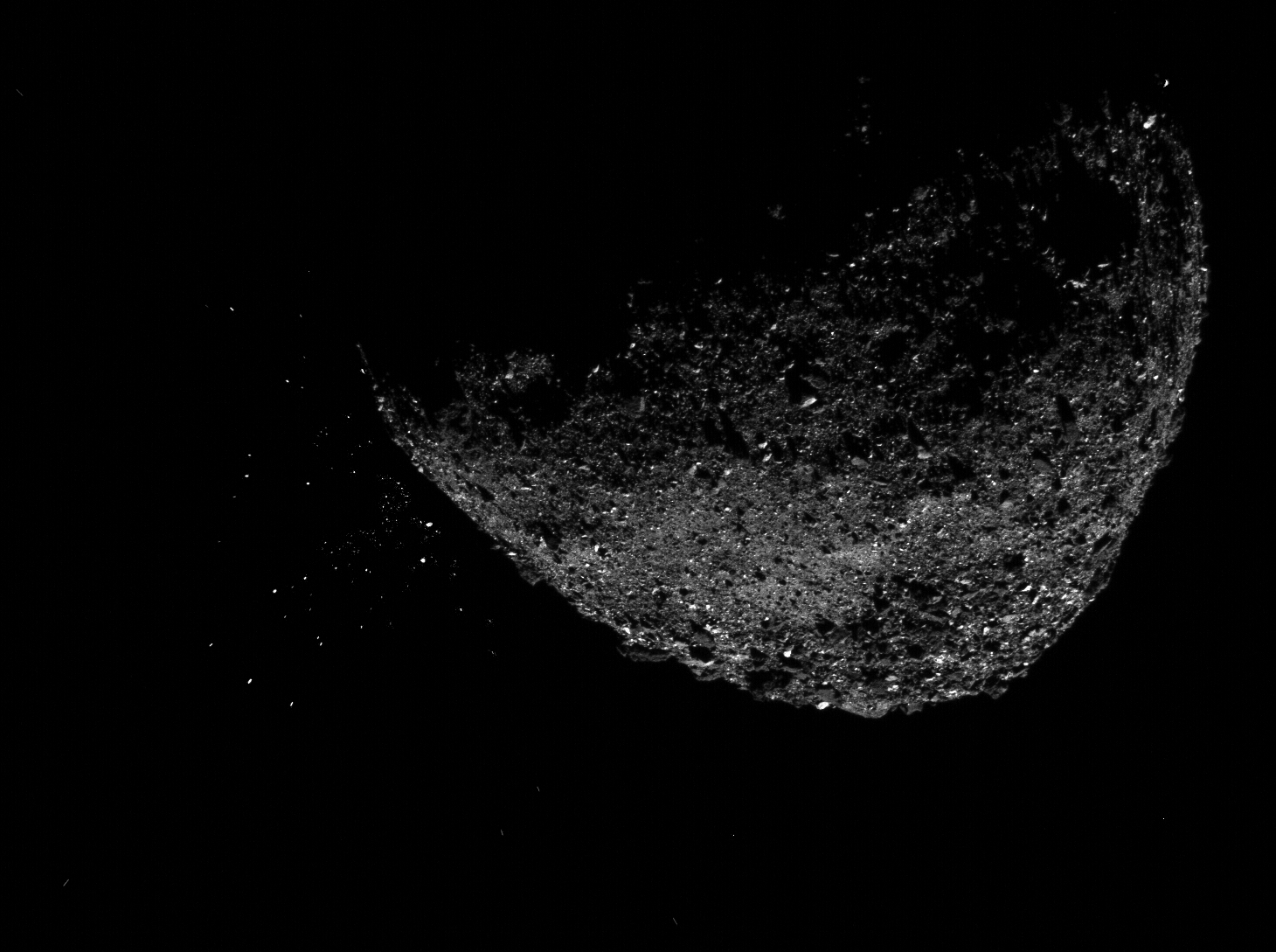
6 January 2019

Particle trajectories from four 2019 ejection events (video; 0:43)

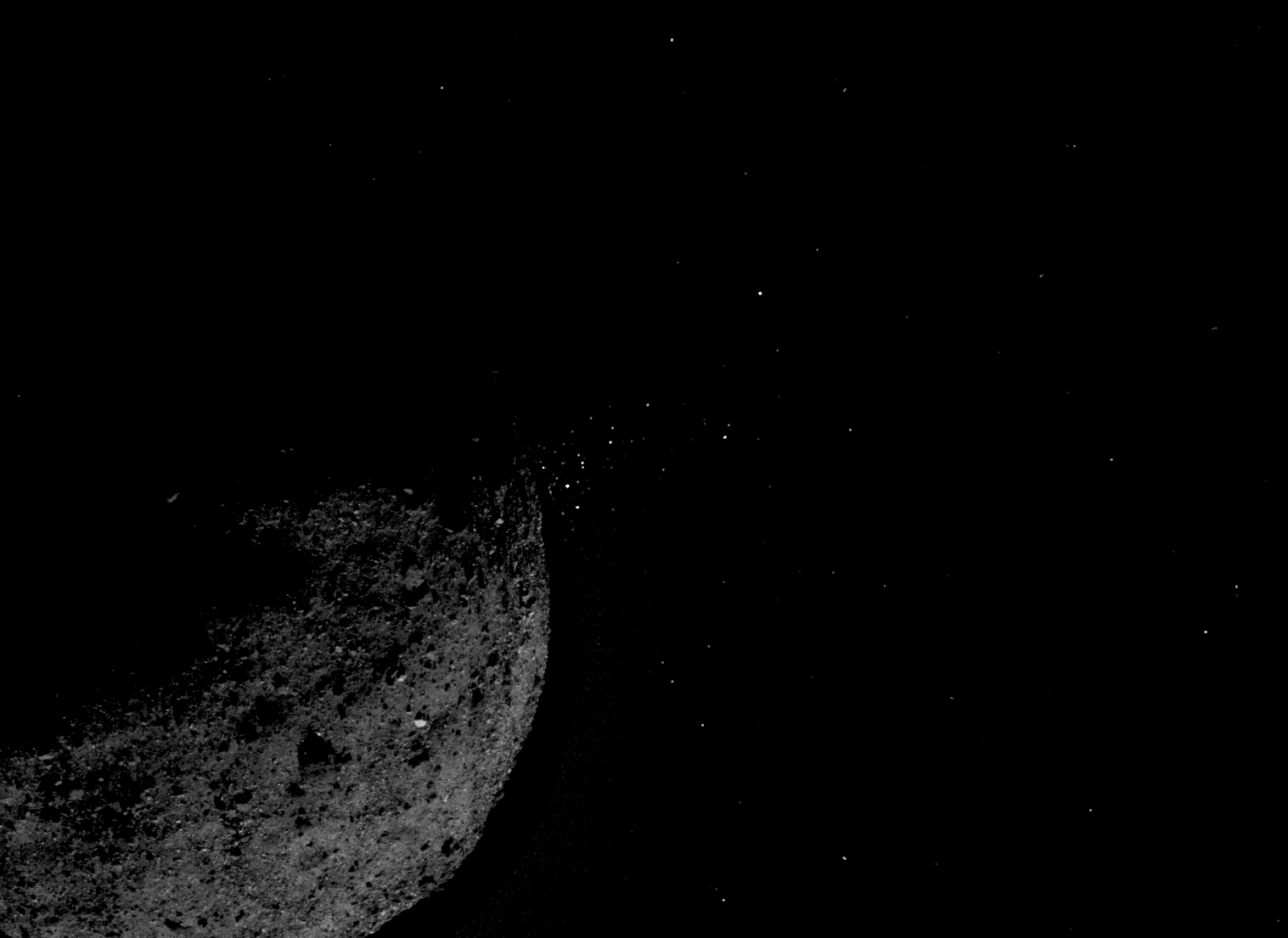
19 January 2019

OSIRIS-REx mission

=== Surface features ===
Asteroid Bennu regolith surface

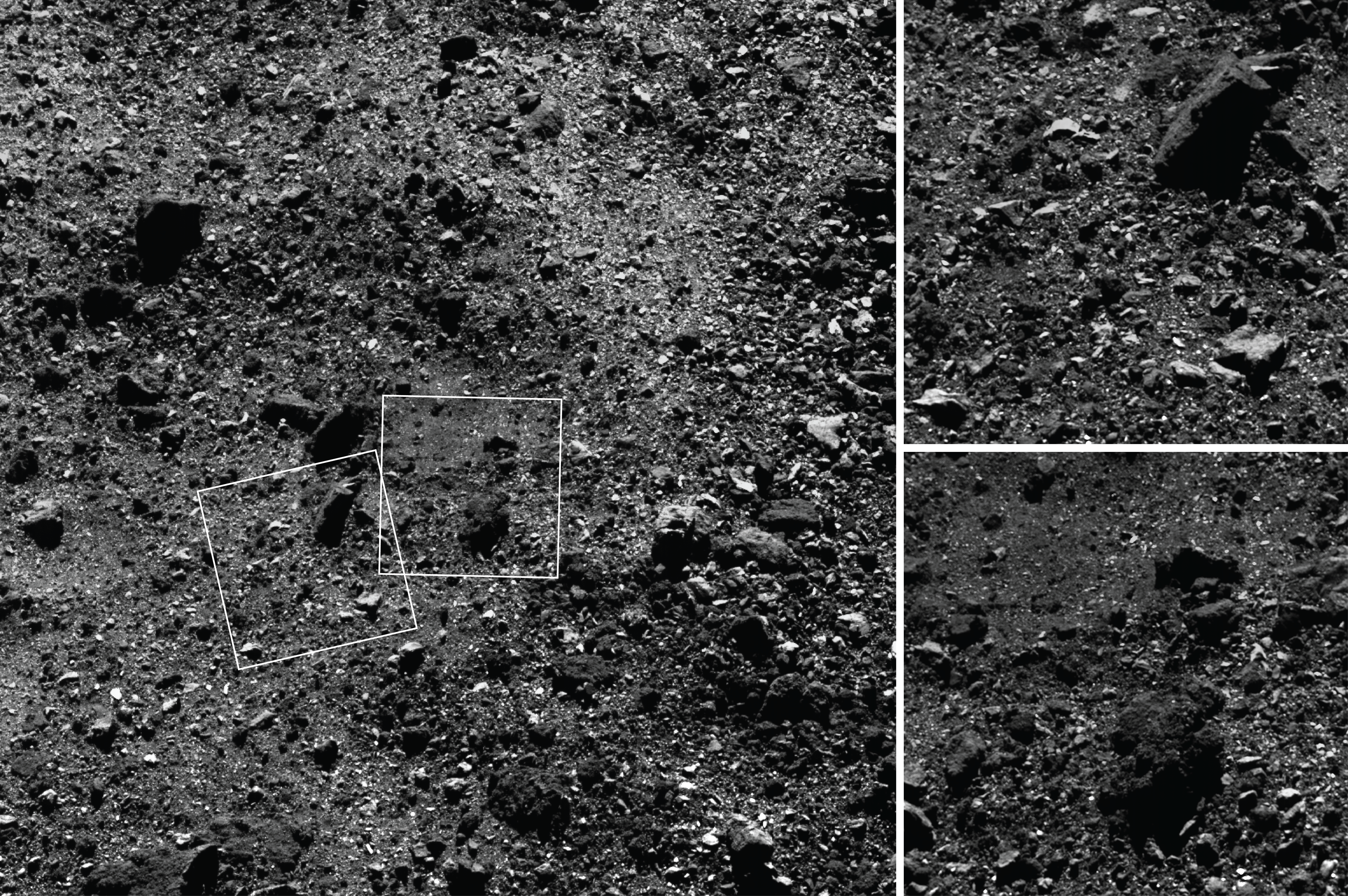
Wide angle shot of the Northern Hemisphere of Bennu, imaged by OSIRIS-REx at an altitude of approximately 1.8 km (1.1 mi)

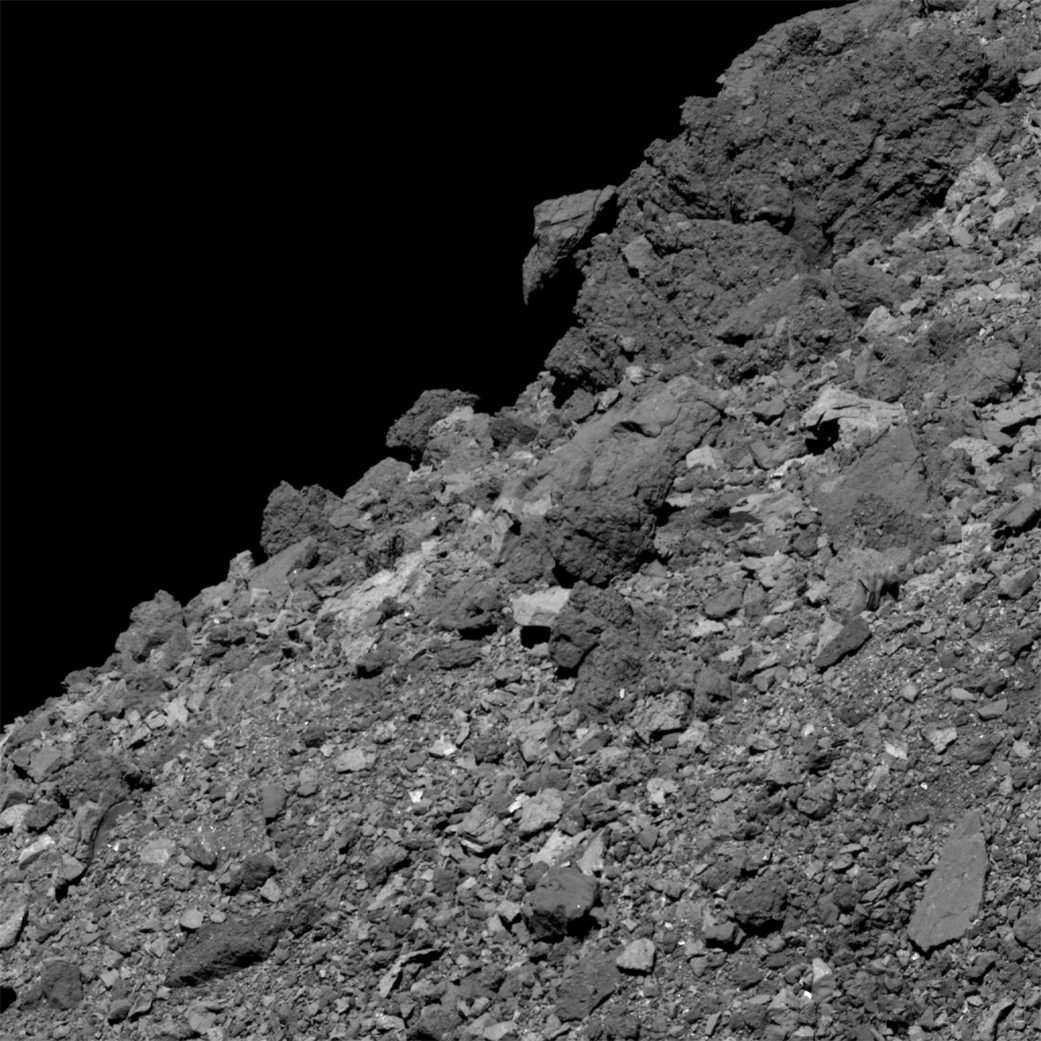
Bennu's regolith-covered surface as imaged by OSIRIS-REx

The Nightingale sample site imaged by OSIRIS-REx at touchdown. The circular TAGSAM head in the center of the frame is 0.30 m (1 ft) in diameter.

All geological features on Bennu are named after various species of birds and bird-like figures in mythology. The first features to be named were the final four candidate OSIRIS-REx sample sites, which were given unofficial names by the team in August 2019. On 6 March 2020 the IAU announced the first official names for 12 Bennu surface features, including regiones (broad geographic regions), craters, dorsa (ridges), fossae (grooves or trenches) and saxa (rocks and boulders).

Analysis showed that the particles making up Bennu's exterior are loosely packed and lightly bound to each other; "The spacecraft would have sunk into Bennu had it not fired its thrusters to back away immediately after it grabbed dust and rock from the asteroid's surface." Analysis also revealed that the Sun's heat fractures rocks on Bennu in just 10,000 to 100,000 years instead of millions of years as was thought before.

==== Candidate sample sites ====
After a thorough analysis of Bennu's surface by the OSIRIS-REx mission team, using data from both MapCam and OVIRS, four candidate sites were selected for sample collection: Nightingale, Kingfisher, Osprey, and Sandpiper. Among these, Nightingale was ultimately chosen, as it exhibited a stronger spectral reddening compared to the rest of the surface (indicating fresher or less exposed terrain). Additionally, it successfully passed the safety assessment tests for the spacecraft's descent.

Final four OSIRIS-REx candidate sample sites
| Name | Location | Description |
|---|---|---|
| Nightingale | 56°N 43°E | Abundant fine-grained material with a large variation in color. Primary sample collection site. |
| Kingfisher | 11°N 56°E | A relatively new crater with the highest water signature of all four sites. |
| Osprey | 11°N 80°E | Located on a low albedo patch with a large variety of rocks. Backup sample collection site. |
| Sandpiper | 47°S 322°E | Located between two young craters, located in rough terrain. Minerals vary in brightness with hints of hydrated minerals. |

On 12 December 2019, after a year of mapping Bennu's surface, a target site was announced. Named Nightingale, the area is near Bennu's north pole and lies inside a small crater within a larger crater. Osprey was selected as the backup sample site.

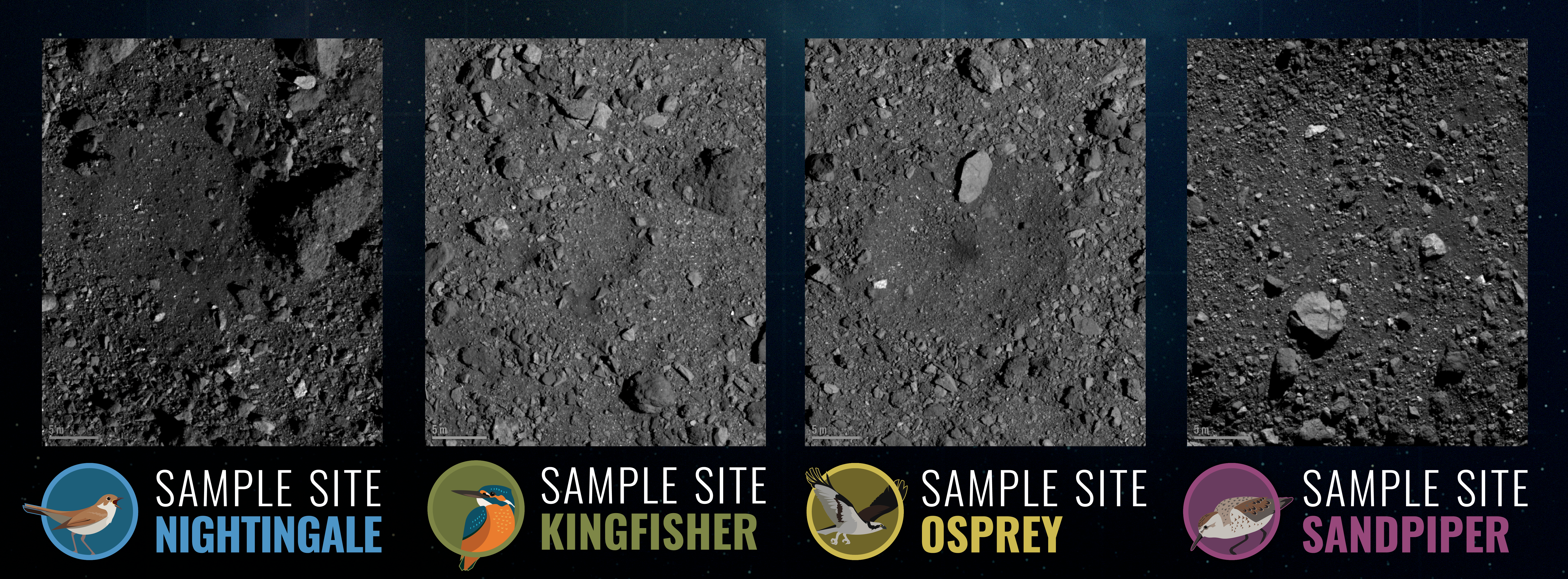
The final four candidate OSIRIS-REx sample sites

==== IAU named features ====
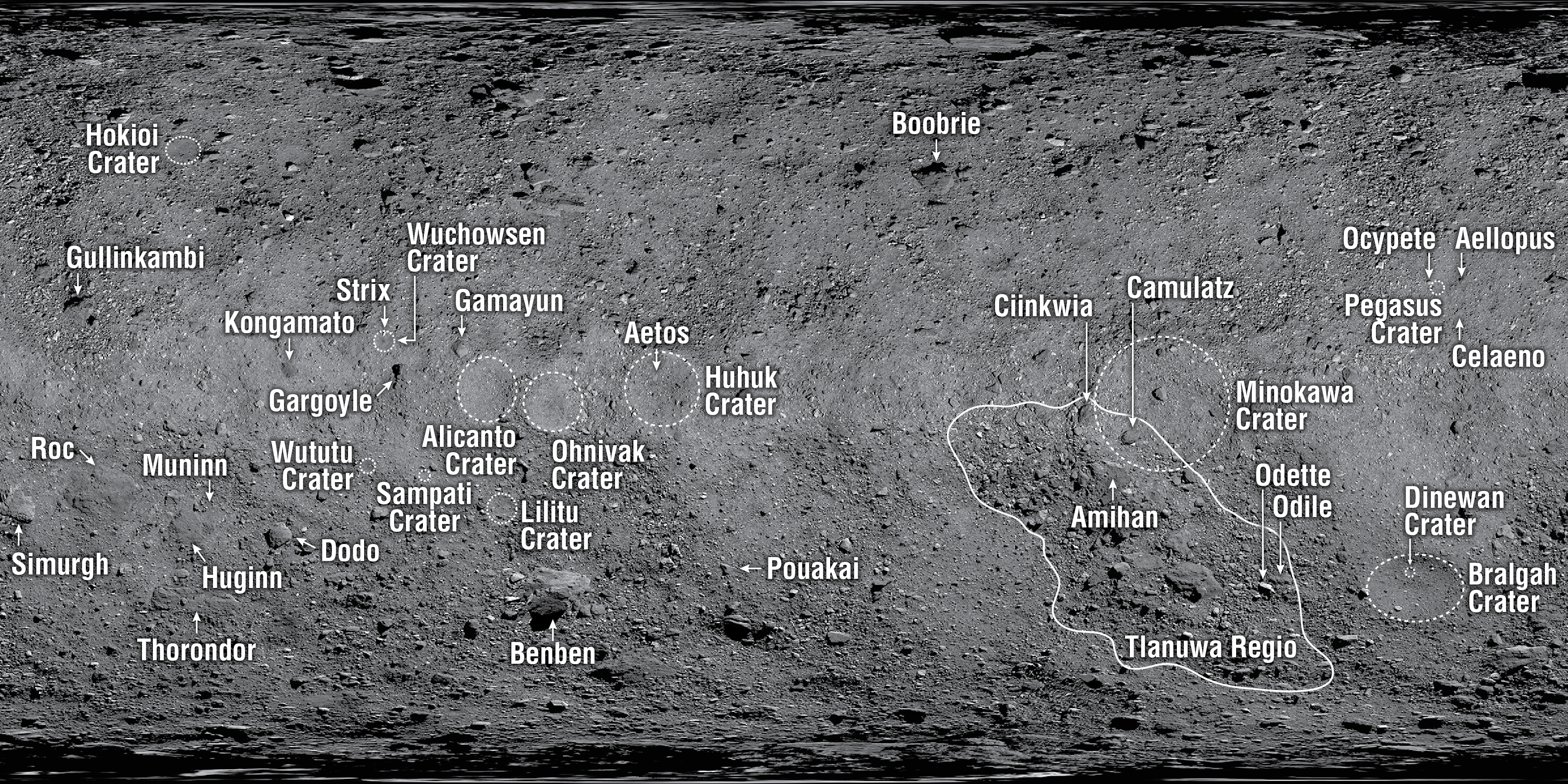
Map of Bennu showing the locations of the IAU-named surface features

Craters
| Name | Coordinates | Diameter (m) | Approval Date | Named After | Ref |
|---|---|---|---|---|---|
| Alicanto | 0.08°S 111.93°E | 61 | 18/12/2020 | Alicanto, bird from Chilean mythology who has glowing wings due to eating metal ores, which make it incapable of flying | WGPSN |
| Bralgha | 44.36°S 324.99°E | 69 | 18/12/2020 | Crane who tossed an egg from Dinewan’s nest into the sky, becoming the Sun | WGPSN |
| Dinewan | 41.4°S 323.7°E | 10 | 18/12/2020 | Emu whose egg became the Sun in Australian mythology | WGPSN |
| Hokioi | 55.07°N 41.78°E | 28 | 18/12/2020 | Maori bird who was sometimes heard but was never seen | WGPSN |
| Huhuk | 1.12°S 152.3°E | 75 | 18/12/2020 | Pawnee thunderbird whose beatings of its wings caused thunder | WGPSN |
| Lilitu | 26.13°S 115.36°E | 28 | 18/12/2020 | Mesopotamian demon who took the form of a woman with wings and bird feet | WGPSN |
| Minokawa | 8.79°S 269.1°E | 181.1 | 18/12/2020 | Minokawa bird who was believed to be large enough to devour the Sun, which explained solar eclipses | WGPSN |
| Ohnivak | 4.23°S 125.67°E | 41 | 18/12/2020 | Czech/Slovak firebird with red, orange, and gold feathers | WGPSN |
| Pegasus | 23.53°N 329.93°E | 14 | 18/12/2020 | Pegasus, winged horse in Greek mythology | WGPSN |
| Sampati | 19.02°S 97.34°E | 11 | 18/12/2020 | Sampati, demigod from Hindu mythology who takes the form of either an eagle or vulture | WGPSN |
| Wuchowsen | 11.78°N 88.13°E | 20 | 18/12/2020 | Giant bird from Algonquian mythology whose name means “Windblower”, which produces wind with its wings | WGPSN |
| Wututu | 17.03°S 84.34°E | 13 | 18/12/2020 | Bird who ended a dispute between two gods, ending a great drought | WGPSN |

Regiones
| Name | Coordinates | Diameter (m) | Approval Date | Named After | Ref |
|---|---|---|---|---|---|
| Tlanuwa Regio | 37.86°S 261.70°E | 301 | 31/01/2020 | Tlanuwa, giant birds from Cherokee mythology | WGPSN |

Saxa
| Name | Coordinates | Diameter (m) | Approval Date | Named After | Ref |
|---|---|---|---|---|---|
| Aellopus Saxum | 25.44°N 335.67°E | 5.7 | 26/03/2020 | Aello, one of the half-bird half-woman Harpy sisters from Greek mythology | WGPSN |
| Aetos Saxum | 3.46°N 150.36°E | 9.1 | 31/01/2020 | Aetos, childhood playmate of the god Zeus who was turned into an eagle from Greek mythology | WGPSN |
| Amihan Saxum | 17.96°S 256.51°E | 33 | 31/01/2020 | Amihan, bird deity from Philippine mythology | WGPSN |
| Benben Saxum | 45.86°S 127.59°E | 52 | 31/01/2020 | Benben, Ancient Egyptian primordial mound that arose from the primordial waters Nu | WGPSN |
| Boobrie Saxum | 48.08°N 214.28°E | 30 | 26/03/2020 | Boobrie, shapeshifting entity from Scottish mythology that often takes the form of a giant water bird | WGPSN |
| Camulatz Saxum | 10.26°S 259.65°E | 22 | 26/03/2020 | Camulatz, one of four birds in the K'iche' creation myth in Maya mythology | WGPSN |
| Celaeno Saxum | 18.42°N 335.23°E | 8 | 26/03/2020 | Celaeno, one of the half-bird half-woman Harpy sisters from Greek mythology | WGPSN |
| Ciinkwia Saxum | 4.97°S 249.47°E | 21 | 26/03/2020 | Ciinkwia, thunder beings from Algonquian mythology that look like giant eagles | WGPSN |
| Dodo Saxum | 32.68°S 64.42°E | 27 | 26/03/2020 | Dodo, a dodo bird character from Alice's Adventures in Wonderland | WGPSN |
| Gamayun Saxum | 9.86°N 105.45°E | 19 | 26/03/2020 | Gamajun, prophetic bird from Slavic mythology | WGPSN |
| Gargoyle Saxum | 4.59°N 92.48°E | 18 | 31/01/2020 | Gargoyle, dragon-like monster with wings | WGPSN |
| Gullinkambi Saxum | 18.53°N 17.96°E | 31 | 26/03/2020 | Gullinkambi, rooster from Norse mythology that lives in Valhalla | WGPSN |
| Huginn Saxum | 29.77°S 43.25°E | 46 | 31/01/2020 | Huginn, one of two ravens that accompany the god Odin in Norse mythology | WGPSN |
| Kongamato Saxum | 5.03°N 66.31°E | 19 | 26/03/2020 | Kongamato, giant flying creature from Kaonde mythology | WGPSN |
| Muninn Saxum | 29.34°S 48.68°E | 28 | 31/01/2020 | Muninn, one of two ravens that accompany the god Odin in Norse mythology | WGPSN |
| Ocypete Saxum | 25.09°N 328.25°E | 5.6 | 31/01/2020 | Ocypete, one of the half-bird half-woman Harpy sisters from Greek mythology | WGPSN |
| Odette Saxum | 44.86°S 291.08°E | 19 | 26/03/2020 | Odette, princess that turns into the White Swan in Swan Lake | WGPSN |
| Odile Saxum | 42.74°S 294.08°E | 25 | 26/03/2020 | Odile, the Black Swan from Swan Lake | WGPSN |
| Pouakai Saxum | 40.45°S 166.75°E | 10.6 | 11/02/2020 | Poukai, monstrous bird from Maori mythology | WGPSN |
| Roc Saxum | 23.46°S 25.36°E | 96 | 31/01/2020 | Roc, giant bird of prey from Arabic mythology | WGPSN |
| Simurgh Saxum | 25.32°S 4.05°E | 40 | 31/01/2020 | Simurgh, benevolent bird that possesses all knowledge from Iranian mythology | WGPSN |
| Strix Saxum | 25.32°S 4.05°E | 5.3 | 31/01/2020 | Strix, bird of ill omen from Classical mythology | WGPSN |
| Thorondor Saxum | 13.40°N 88.26°E | 61 | 26/03/2020 | Thorondor, the King of the Eagles in Tolkien's Middle-earth | WGPSN |

== Origin and evolution ==
The carbonaceous material that composes Bennu came from the breakup of a much larger parent body—a minor planet or a proto-planet. It is thought to be a rubble pile of the second generation or later, formed within the past 65 million years. Like nearly all matter in the Solar System, its atoms were created in dying stars. According to the accretion theory, this material came together 4.5 billion years ago during the formation of the Solar System.

Bennu's basic mineralogy and chemical nature would have been established during the first 10 million years of the Solar System's formation, where the carbonaceous material underwent some geologic heating and chemical transformation inside a much larger minor planet or a proto-planet capable of producing the requisite pressure, heat and hydration (if need be)—into more complex minerals. Bennu probably began in the inner asteroid belt as a fragment from a larger body with a diameter of 100 km (62 mi). Simulations suggest that it came from either the Polana or Eulalia subdivisions of the Nysa–Polana complex, with a 70% chance it came from the Polana family and a 30% chance it derived from the Eulalia family. Impactors on boulders of Bennu indicate that Bennu has been in near Earth orbit (separated from the main asteroid belt) for 1–2.5 million years.

Subsequently, the orbit drifted as a result of the Yarkovsky effect and mean motion resonances with the giant planets, such as Jupiter and Saturn. Various interactions with the planets in combination with the Yarkovsky effect modified the asteroid, possibly changing its spin, shape, and surface features.

Cellino et al. have suggested a possible cometary origin for Bennu, based on similarities of its spectroscopic properties with known comets. The estimated fraction of comets in the population of near Earth objects is 8%±5%. This includes rock comet 3200 Phaethon, discovered and still numbered as an asteroid.

== Orbit ==
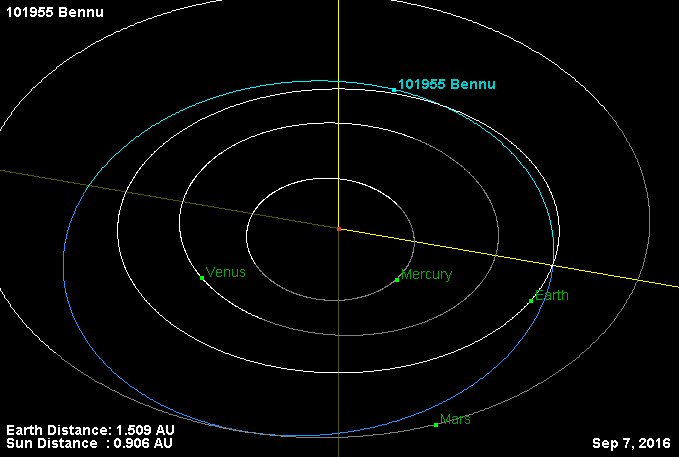
Diagram of the orbits of Bennu and the inner planets around the Sun

Bennu orbits the Sun with a period of 1.19 years (435 days) as of 2022. Earth gets as close as about 480,000 km (0.0032 au) from its orbit around 23 to 25 September. On 22 September 1999 Bennu passed 0.0147 au from Earth, and six years later on 20 September 2005 it passed 0.033 au from Earth. The next close approaches of less than 0.04 au will be 30 September 2054 and then 23 September 2060, which will perturb the orbit slightly. Between the close approach of 1999 and that of 2060, Earth completes 61 orbits and Bennu 51. An even closer approach will occur on 25 September 2135 around 0.0014 au (see table). In the 75 years between the 2060 and 2135 approaches, Bennu completes 64 orbits, meaning its period will have changed to 1.17 years (427 days). The Earth approach of 2135 will increase the orbital period to about 1.24 years (452 days). Before the 2135 Earth approach, Bennu will be at its maximum distance from Earth on 27 November 2045 at a distance of 2.34 AU (350 million km).

Bennu approaches less than 0.05AU Position uncertainty and increasing divergence
| Date | JPL SBDB nominal geocentric distance (AU) | uncertainty region (3-sigma) |
|---|---|---|
| 2054-09-30 | 0.039299 AU (5.8790 million km) | ±7 km |
| 2060-09-23 | 0.005008 AU (749.2 thousand km) | ±5 km |
| 2080-09-22 | 0.015630 AU (2.3382 million km) | ±3 thousand km |
| 2135-09-25 | 0.001364 AU (204.1 thousand km) | ±20 thousand km |
| (virtual impactor); 2182-09-24 | ≈0.3 AU (40 million km) (Gravity Simulator); 1.1 AU (160 million km) (NEODyS) | ±370 million km |

=== Possible Earth impact ===
On average, an asteroid with a diameter of 500 m (1,600 ft; 0.31 mi) can be expected to impact Earth about every 130,000 years. A 2010 dynamical study by Andrea Milani and collaborators predicted a series of eight potential Earth impacts by Bennu between 2169 and 2199. The cumulative probability of impact is dependent on physical properties of Bennu that were poorly known at the time, but was found to not exceed 0.071% for all eight encounters. The authors recognized that an accurate assessment of 101955 Bennu's probability of Earth impact would require a detailed shape model and additional observations (either from the ground or from spacecraft visiting the object) to determine the magnitude and direction of the Yarkovsky effect.

The publication of the shape model and of astrometry based on radar observations obtained in 1999, 2005, and 2011 made possible an improved estimate of the Yarkovsky acceleration and a revised assessment of the impact probability. In 2014, the best estimate of the impact probability was a cumulative probability of 0.037% in the interval 2175 to 2196. This corresponds to a cumulative rating on the Palermo scale of −1.71. If an impact were to occur, the expected kinetic energy associated with the collision would be 1,200 megatons in TNT equivalent (for comparison, TNT equivalent of Tsar Bomba, the most powerful nuclear weapon ever tested, was approximately 54 megatons, and that of the Tunguska event, the most energetic impact event in recorded history, has been estimated at 3–5 megatons, though another estimate is 20–30 megatons).

The 2021 orbit solution extended the virtual impactors from the year 2200 to the year 2300 and slightly increased the cumulative Palermo impact hazard scale rating to −1.42. The solution included the estimated gravitational effect of 343 other asteroids, representing about 90% of the total mass of the main asteroid belt.

=== 2060/2135 close approaches ===
Animation of 101955 Bennu's position relative to the Earth, as both orbit the Sun, in the years 2128 to 2138. 2135 close approach is shown near the end of the animation. Earth · 101955 Bennu

Bennu will pass 0.005 au (750,000 km; 460,000 mi) from Earth on 23 September 2060, while for comparison the Moon's average orbital distance (lunar distance) is 384,402 km (238,856 mi) and will only change to 384,404 km in 50 years. Bennu will be too dim to be seen with common binoculars. The close approach of 2060 causes divergence in the close approach of 2135. On 25 September 2135, the Earth approach distance is 0.00136 au (203,000 km; 126,000 mi) ±20 thousand km. There is no chance of an Earth impact in 2135. The 2135 approach will create many lines of variations and Bennu may pass through a gravitational keyhole during the 2135 passage which could create an impact scenario at a future encounter. The keyholes are all less than ~20 km wide with some keyholes being only 5 meters wide.

==== 2182 ====
The most threatening virtual impactor is on Tuesday, 24 September 2182 when there is a 1 in 2,700 chance of an Earth impact, but the asteroid could be as far as the Sun is from Earth. To impact Earth on 24 September 2182 Bennu must pass through a keyhole roughly 5 km wide on 25 September 2135. The next two biggest risks occur in 2187 (1:14,000) and 2192 (1:26,000). There is a cumulative 1 in 1,800 chance of an Earth impact between 2178 and 2290.

=== Long term ===
Lauretta et al. reported in 2015 their results of a computer simulation, concluding that it is more likely that 101955 Bennu will be destroyed by some other cause:

The orbit of Bennu is intrinsically dynamically unstable, as are those of all NEOs. In order to glean probabilistic insights into the future evolution and likely fate of Bennu beyond a few hundred years, we tracked 1,000 virtual "Bennus" for an interval of 300 Myr with the gravitational perturbations of the planets Mercury–Neptune included. Our results ... indicate that Bennu has a 48% chance of falling into the Sun. There is a 10% probability that Bennu will be ejected out of the inner Solar System, most likely after a close encounter with Jupiter. The highest impact probability for a planet is with Venus (26%), followed by the Earth (10%) and Mercury (3%). The odds of Bennu striking Mars are only 0.8% and there is a 0.2% chance that Bennu will eventually collide with Jupiter.

Asteroids of absolute magnitude less than 21 passing less than 1 lunar distance from Earth
| Asteroid | Date | Nominal approach distance (LD) | Min. distance (LD) | Max. distance (LD) | Absolute magnitude (H) | Size (meters) |
|---|---|---|---|---|---|---|
| (152680) 1998 KJ9 | 1914-12-31 | 0.606 | 0.604 | 0.608 | 19.4 | 279–900 |
| (458732) 2011 MD5 | 1918-09-17 | 0.911 | 0.909 | 0.913 | 17.9 | 556–1795 |
| (163132) 2002 CU11 | 1925-08-30 | 0.903 | 0.901 | 0.905 | 18.5 | 443–477 |
| 2017 VW13 | 2001-11-08 | 0.373 | 0.316 | 3.236 | 20.7 | 153–494 |
| (153814) 2001 WN5 | 2028-06-26 | 0.647 | 0.647 | 0.647 | 18.2 | 921–943 |
| 99942 Apophis | 2029-04-13 | 0.0989 | 0.0989 | 0.0989 | 19.7 | 310–340 |
| 2005 WY55 | 2065-05-28 | 0.865 | 0.856 | 0.874 | 20.7 | 153–494 |
| 101955 Bennu | 2135-09-25 | 0.531 | 0.507 | 0.555 | 20.19 | 472–512 |
| (153201) 2000 WO107 | 2140-12-01 | 0.634 | 0.631 | 0.637 | 19.3 | 427–593 |

=== Meteor shower ===
As an active asteroid with a small minimum orbit intersection distance from Earth, Bennu may be the parent body of a weak meteor shower. Bennu particles would radiate around 25 September from the southern constellation of Sculptor. The meteors are expected to be near the naked eye visibility limit and only produce a Zenith hourly rate of less than 1.

== Exploration ==
=== OSIRIS-REx ===
The successful October 2020 sample collection, showing OSIRIS-REx touching down on the Nightingale sample site

The OSIRIS-REx mission of NASA's New Frontiers program was launched towards 101955 Bennu on 8 September 2016. On 3 December 2018, the spacecraft arrived at the asteroid Bennu after a two-year journey. One week later, at the American Geophysical Union Fall Meeting, investigators announced that OSIRIS-REx had discovered spectroscopic evidence for hydrated minerals on the surface of the asteroid, implying that liquid water was present in Bennu's parent body before it split off.

On 20 October 2020, OSIRIS-REx descended to the asteroid and "pogo-sticked off" it while successfully collecting a sample. On 7 April 2021, OSIRIS-REx completed its final flyover of the asteroid and began slowly drifting away from it. On 10 May 2021, the departure was completed with OSIRIS-REx still managing to contain the asteroid sample. OSIRIS-REx returned samples to Earth in 2023 via a capsule-drop by parachute, ultimately, from the spacecraft to the Earth's surface in Utah on 24 September 2023.

Shortly after the sample container was retrieved and transferred to an airtight chamber at the Johnson Space Center in Houston, Texas, the lid on the container was opened. Scientists commented that they "found black dust and debris on the avionics deck of the OSIRIS-REx science canister" on the initial opening. Further study is planned. On 11 October 2023, the recovered capsule was opened to reveal a "first look" at the asteroid sample contents. On 13 December 2023, further studies of the returned sample were reported and revealed organic molecules as well as unknown materials which require more study to have a better idea of their composition and makeup. On 11 January 2024, NASA reported finally fully opening, after three months of trying, the recovered container with samples from the Bennu asteroid. The total weight of the recovered material weighed 121.6 g (4.29 oz), over twice the mission's goal. On 15 May 2024, an overview of preliminary analytical studies on the returned samples was reported.

=== Selection ===
The asteroid Bennu was selected from over half a million known asteroids by the OSIRIS-REx selection committee. The primary constraint for selection was close proximity to Earth, since proximity implies low impulse (Δv) required to reach an object from Earth orbit. The criteria stipulated an asteroid in an orbit with low eccentricity, low inclination, and an orbital radius of 0.8–1.6 au. Furthermore, the candidate asteroid for a sample-return mission must have loose regolith on its surface, which implies a diameter greater than 200 meters. Asteroids smaller than this typically spin too fast to retain dust or small particles. Finally, a desire to find an asteroid with pristine carbon material from the early Solar System, possibly including volatile molecules and organic compounds, reduced the list further.

With the above criteria applied, five asteroids remained as candidates for the OSIRIS-REx mission, and Bennu was chosen, in part for its potentially hazardous orbit.

OSIRIS-REx – 101955 Bennu – Earth

Trajectory in the Solar System from 9 August 2016 to 24 September 2023

Trajectory around 101955 Bennu from 25 December 2018

Touchdown on Bennu

=== Returned samples ===
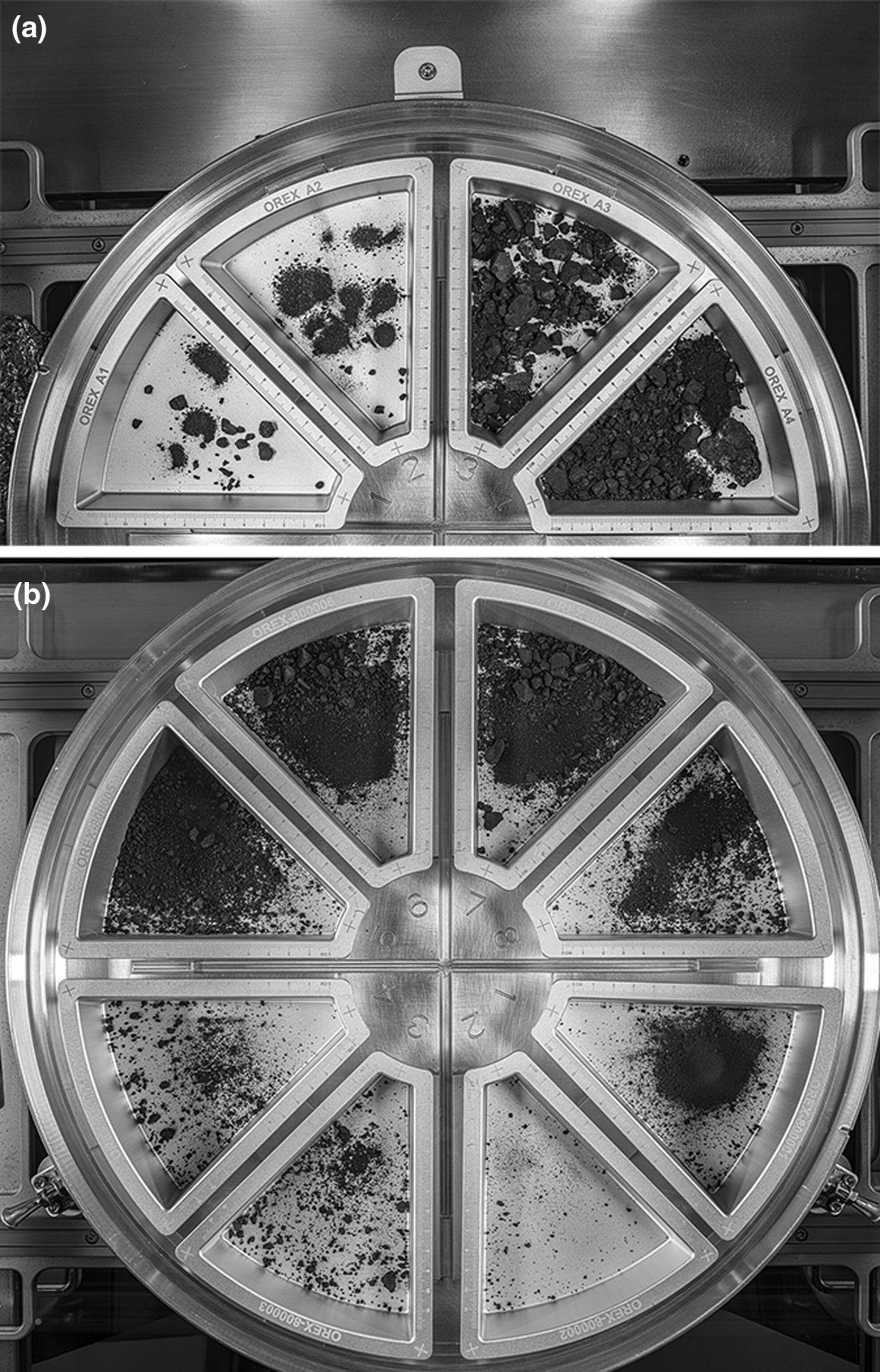
The bulk Bennu sample in the glovebox. (a) Sample obtained from the top of the Mylar flap (left two trays) and scooped from beneath it (right two trays). (b) Sample poured from the TAGSAM into eight trays.

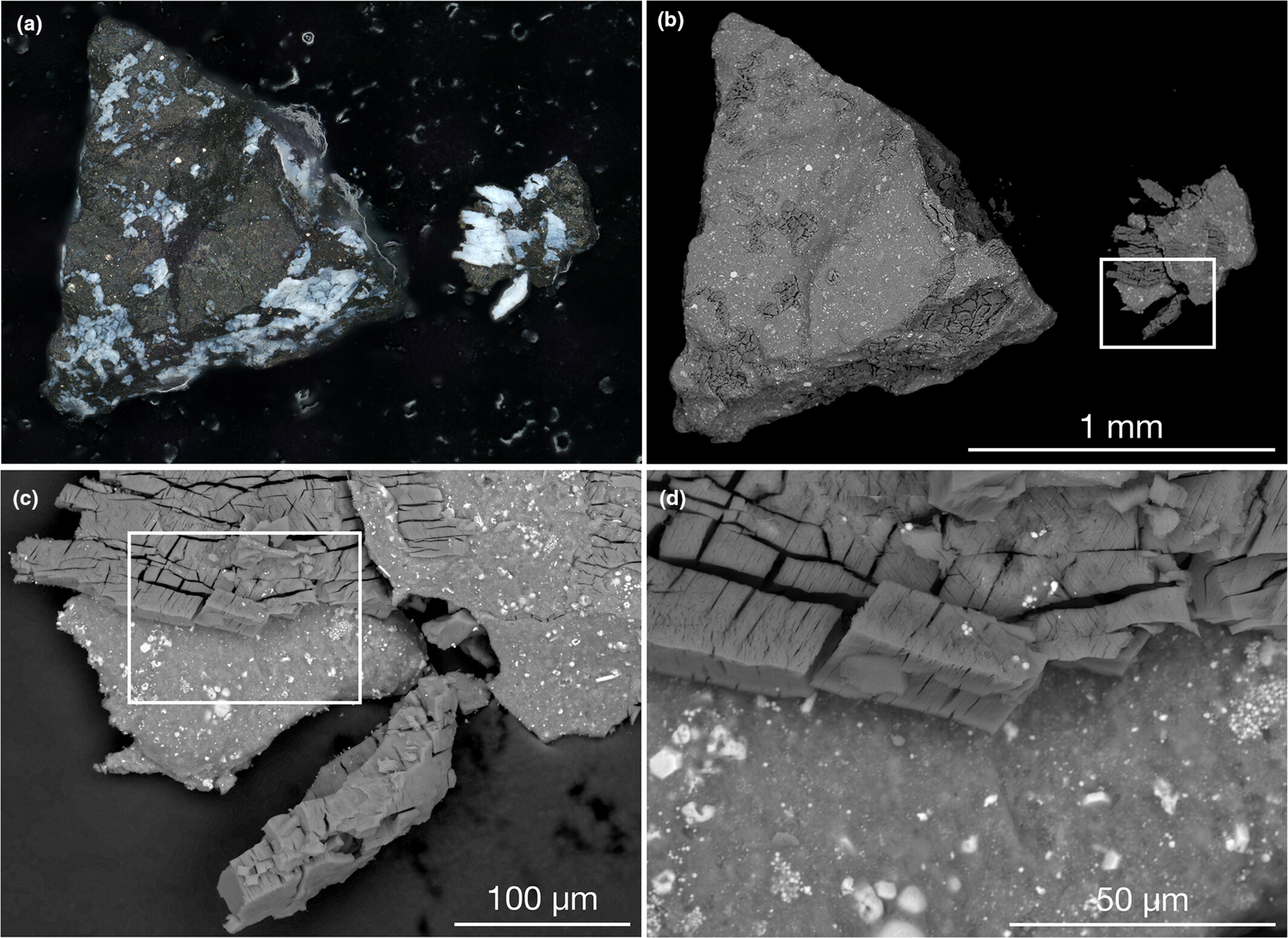
Phosphate in a mottled particle (OREX-803009-101). (a) Visible light microscopy image of a dark particle with an outer crust of high-reflectance material. (b–d) SEM images showing progressively zoomed view of a fragment of the particle that split off along a high-reflectance vein, revealing material similar to the outer crust, with a blocky friable texture and consisting of Na, Mg, and P.

The OSIRIS-REx mission successfully returned approximately 120 grams of material from Bennu to Earth in September 2023. The returned material is predominantly very dark, with reflectance values consistent with observations of Bennu's surface, though it contains some brighter inclusions and particles. Particle sizes in the sample span a wide range, from submicron dust to rocks measuring about 3.5 cm in length. Mineralogical analysis shows that the sample is rich in hydrated minerals, particularly Mg-rich phyllosilicates, confirming predictions from remote sensing data. Other major components include magnetite, sulfides, carbonates, and organic compounds. An unexpected discovery was the presence of phosphate minerals in some samples, including Mg, Na-rich phosphates found as veins and crusts in some particles.

The elemental composition of the Bennu samples closely resembles that of CI chondrite meteorites. However, the Bennu material shows some distinct isotopic ratios. The average oxygen isotopic composition places Bennu in the same region of oxygen three-isotope space as CI and CY chondrites, as well as samples from asteroid Ryugu. The carbon content of the samples (4.5–4.7 wt%) is higher than that found in known meteorites and Ryugu samples. The presence of presolar grains in the samples indicates that some of the material has remained largely unprocessed since the formation of the solar system. Presolar silicon carbide and graphite were identified, with abundances of 52+12
−10 ppm and 12+7
−5 ppm respectively, similar to unheated chondrite samples.

Evidence suggests that the samples come from at least two different lithologies on Bennu's surface. Three predominant types of particles were identified: hummocky, angular, and mottled. These show distinct densities, with hummocky particles having the lowest average density (1.55±0.07 g/cm^{3}) and mottled particles the highest (1.77±0.04 g/cm^{3}). Spectral analysis of the samples shows a redder slope from 0.4 to 2.5 μm compared to Bennu's global spectrum, potentially indicating differences in particle size, surface texture, or space weathering between the sampled material and the asteroid's surface.

Since 3 November 2023, a part of the sample is exhibited at the Hall of Meteorites of the National Museum of Natural History (Washington, DC). Another portion of the sample was exhibited by NASA at the International Astronautical Congress in Milan, Italy, from 14 to 18 October 2024.

In January 2025, it was reported that a wide range of carbon- and nitrogen-rich organic compounds were identified in samples returned from Bennu, including all five nucleobases (adenine, thymine, cytosine, guanine, and uracil) that are the essential building blocks of DNA and RNA. Fourteen of the 20 amino acids that make up proteins in terrestrial organisms were also present, but unlike the amino acids found in organisms on Earth, the amino acids from Bennu had mixed chirality.

== See also ==
- List of minor planets and comets visited by spacecraft
- Terminator orbit, the orbit class used by OSIRIS-REx at Bennu
- 162173 Ryugu, an asteroid being studied by JAXA concurrent with the NASA mission to 101955 Bennu
