= 2005 WY55 =

Near-Earth asteroid

2005 WY_{55}
Discovery
- Discovery date: 26 November 2005

Designations
- Minor planet category: Apollo NEO, PHA

Orbital characteristics
- Epoch 21 November 2025 (JD 2461000.5)
- Uncertainty parameter 0
- Observation arc: 1451 days (3.97 yr)
- Aphelion: 4.2849 AU (641.01 Gm) (Q)
- Perihelion: 0.70130 AU (104.913 Gm) (q)
- Semi-major axis: 2.4931 AU (372.96 Gm) (a)
- Eccentricity: 0.71870 (e)
- Orbital period (sidereal): 3.94 yr (1437.8 d)
- Mean anomaly: 12.1931° (M)
- Mean motion: 0° 15^{m} 1.368^{s} /day (n)
- Inclination: 7.27396° (i)
- Longitude of ascending node: 247.95° (Ω)
- Argument of perihelion: 286.40° (ω)
- Earth MOID: 0.00283688 AU (424,391 km)
- Jupiter MOID: 0.951625 AU (142.3611 Gm)

Physical characteristics
- Dimensions: 190-250 meters
- Absolute magnitude (H): 20.7

2005 WY_{55} is a near-Earth asteroid belonging to the Apollo group. It was first discovered on 26 November 2005. The asteroid will pass within 330,000 km (0.9 lunar distances) from the Earth on 28 May 2065. It has an absolute magnitude (H) of 20.68. It is estimated to be 190 to 250 meters in diameter. It was removed from the Sentry Risk Table on 1 July 2006.

H < 21 asteroids passing less than 1 LD from Earth
Asteroid	Date	Nominal approach distance (LD)	Min. distance (LD)	Max. distance (LD)	Absolute magnitude (H)	Size (meters)
(152680) 1998 KJ9	1914-12-31	0.606	0.604	0.608	19.4	279–900
(458732) 2011 MD5	1918-09-17	0.911	0.909	0.913	17.9	556–1795
(163132) 2002 CU11	1925-08-30	0.903	0.901	0.905	18.5	443–477
2017 VW13	2001-11-08	0.454	0.318	3.436	20.7	153–494
(153814) 2001 WN5	2028-06-26	0.647	0.647	0.647	18.2	921–943
99942 Apophis	2029-04-13	0.0981	0.0963	0.1000	19.7	310–340
2005 WY_{55}	2065-05-28	0.865	0.856	0.874	20.7	153–494
101955 Bennu	2135-09-25	0.780	0.308	1.406	20.19	472–512
(153201) 2000 WO107	2140-12-01	0.634	0.631	0.637	19.3	427–593

Preceded by 2012 UE34	Large NEO Earth close approach (inside the orbit of the Moon); 28 May 2065	Succeeded by 2007 YV56
