= Amihan =

Dry season during winter and spring in the Philippines

In the Philippines, amihan refers to the season dominated by the prevailing winds or trade winds, which are experienced in the country as a cool northeast wind or northeast monsoon. It is characterized by moderate temperatures, little or no rainfall in the central and western part of Luzon and Visayas, and a prevailing wind from the east. On the east coast of Luzon it brings drizzling rainfall and squalls. The effect on Mindanao is relatively less than in the northern part of the country.

As a rule of thumb, the Philippines' amihan weather pattern begins sometime in mid- to late October or November and ends sometime in March or early to mid-April. There may, however, be wide variations from year to year.

Throughout the rest of the year the Philippines experiences the west or southwest wind, or the southwest monsoon, referred to as the habagat, which begins sometime in mid- to late May or June and ends sometime in October. The habagat season is characterized by hot and humid weather, frequent heavy rainfall, and a prevailing wind from the western parts.

The main indicator of the switch between the amihan and habagat seasonal patterns is the switch in wind direction. In most years this transition is abrupt and occurs overnight. In some years there is a period of about a week or two where the wind would switch between amihan and habagat patterns several times before settling into the pattern for the new season to come.

== Amihan and Habagat in folktales and myths ==
=== Wind Lovers ===
Amihan is the personification of the Northeast Wind in Philippine mythology. In one tale, Habagat fell in love with Amihan and competed against other wind gods, including his fiercest rival, Buhawi (Typhoon), in a contest of speed and strength. After emerging victorious, he took Amihan to Himpapawiran, where they ruled together.

=== The Children of Bathala ===
Amihan is also depicted with Habagat which explains the wind patterns in the country. In one legend, they are depicted as children of the supreme deity Bathala. They are allowed by their father to play in turns, every half a year, since having the two play together causes destruction in the land. Amihan is depicted as the gentler sister while Habagat is depicted as the more active brother

=== Rival Titans ===
In another legend, Amihan is depicted as a giant who is at war with another giant Habagat.

=== The Creation myth ===
In Tagalog folklore, Amihan was one of the first beings in the universe, alongside Bathala and Aman Sinaya. She is the personification of the northeast wind, often depicted as a beautiful, long-haired woman who brings cool breezes and protects fishermen. Amihan played a crucial role in the creation myth, where she started a war between Bathala (Sky God) and Aman Sinaya (Sea God). Taking the form of a bird, she flew between them, bringing peace and helping shape the Philippine archipelago.

== In culture ==
- Amihan (mythology) has multiple versions in Philippine mythology due to the country's cultural diversity and the evolving nature of oral traditions. In one story, she is the object of affection in a wind contest between Habagat and other wind gods.In another, she is depicted as the gentler sister of Habagat, with both winds taking turns in their role to avoid destruction. In some legends, Amihan is portrayed as a giant at war with Habagat. In the creation myth, she plays a crucial role between the gods Bathala (Sky God) and Aman Sinaya (Sea God) and helps shape the Philippine archipelago. These variations reflect the different interpretations of Amihan across regions and communities in the Philippines.

== See also ==
- Amis people
- Monsoon
