= Eumachia =

Roman entrepreneur and priestess (fl. 1st century AD)

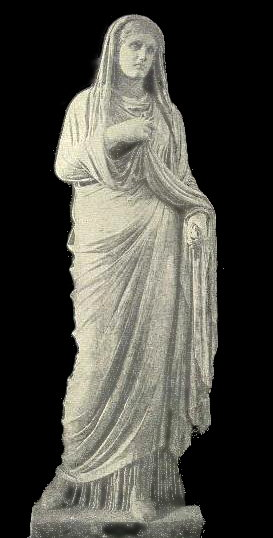
The statue erected in honor of Eumachia at Pompeii

Eumachia (fl. 1st century AD) was a Roman business entrepreneur and priestess. She served as the public priestess of Venus Pompeiana in Pompeii as well as the matron of the Fullers guild. She is known primarily from inscriptions on a large public building which she financed and dedicated to Pietas and Concordia Augusta.

== Name and family ==
Eumachia was the daughter of Lucius Eumachius, who amassed a large fortune as a manufacturer of bricks, tiles and amphorae. She married Marcus Numistrius Fronto, who may have held the important office of duovir. The Numistrii were one of Pompeii's oldest and most powerful families. All that is certain is that Eumachia was able to use her wealth and social standing to obtain the position of public priestess of the goddess Venus Pompeiana (the city's patron goddess), and she became a successful patronus of the economically significant guild of fullers, the guild which consisted of tanners, dyers and clothing-makers.

== Social significance ==
Eumachia is essential as an example of how a Roman woman of non-imperial/non-aristocratic descent could become an important figure in a community and be involved in public affairs. She is seen as a representative for the increasing involvement of women in politics, using the power of a public priestess, the only political office able to be held by a woman for social mobility. Female patronage of public construction projects was related to priesthoods in Pompeii; these public responsibilities, paired with familial status, may have given women the authority or opportunity to bequest monuments to communities. As priestesses, these women guarded long-held communal traditions. They used their patronage to erect monuments that reflected their or their families' predominance and social standing in the town. In exchange, these prominent patrons were honored with honorific sculptures in life and donations of land for tombs or money for funerals after death . The disparities between Mamia, a 1st-century public priestess in Pompeii from a prominent family in Herculaneum, officially sanctioned tomb, and Eumachia's private tomb show how diverse the social response may be. However, the range of social functions depicted in sculptures of women is more limited: this reflects both their actual place in society and the ideal of womanly behavior (for the elite, at least). The Romans were caught in a bind when publicly displaying their women in portrait statues: The ideal of the sexually faithful, domestically oriented, heir-producing matron, who was reluctant to be seen in public, clashed with the reality of the politically active women of the imperial court and the financially significant female municipal patrons in towns across the empire. Funerary inscriptions emphasize women's domestic and familial values: chastity, material fidelity, wifely and motherly devotion, and attention to household chores.

== Building of Eumachia ==
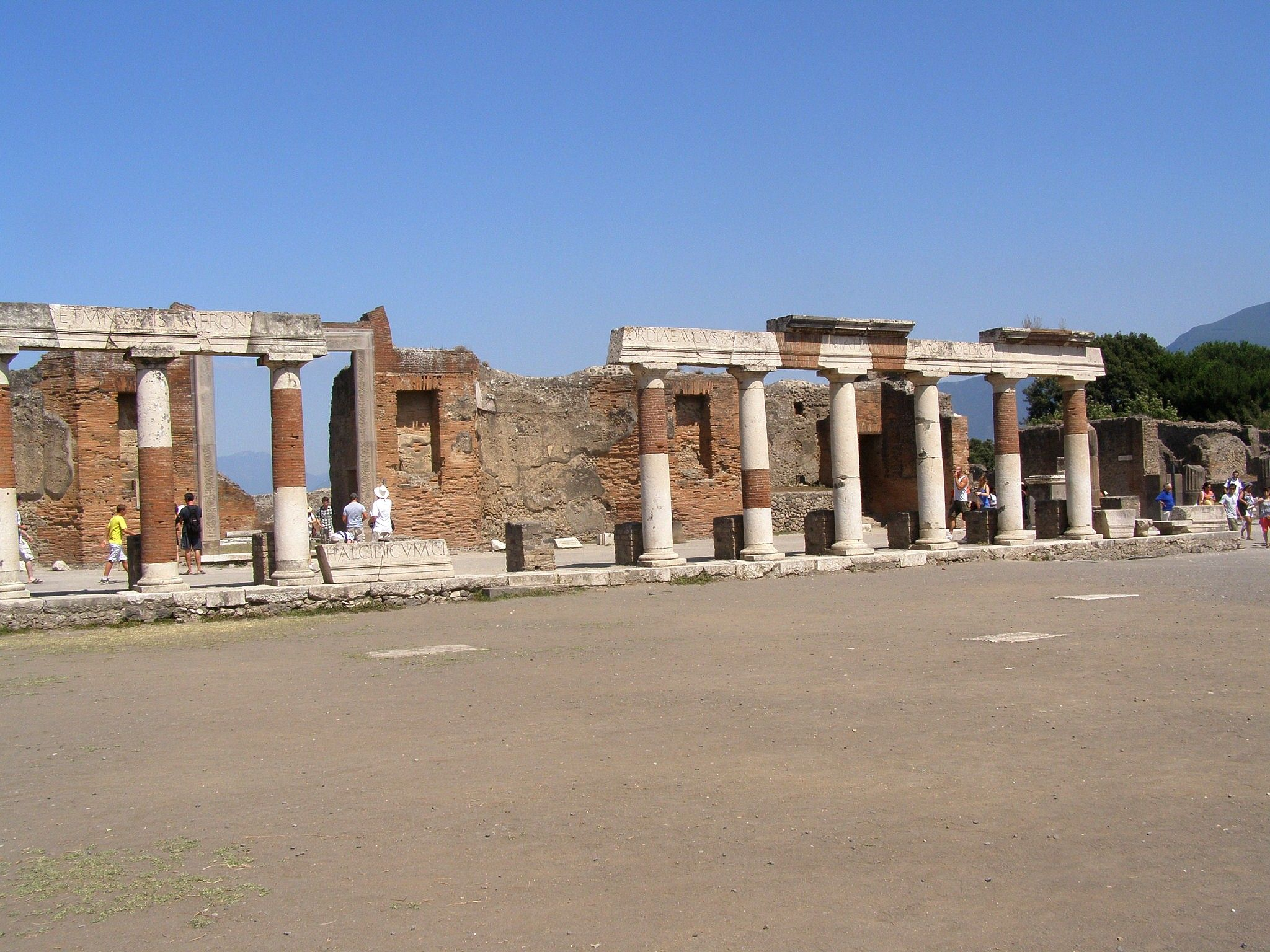
Ruins of the building funded by Eumachia, with portions of the inscription visible on the horizontal light-colored stone

The building of Eumachia, the largest building near the forum of Pompeii, is commonly broken down into three parts, the chalcidicum, the porticus, and the crypta. The chalcidicum encompasses the front of the building and is an important part of the continuous portico running along the east of the forum. The porticus is a four-sided colonnade surrounding a large courtyard. Finally, the crypta is a large corridor behind the porticus on the north east and south sides, separated from the porticus by a single wall that has windows that were probably once shuttered, in earlier descriptions, there were even cisterns, vats, basins, and stone tables in the courtyard. In the center of the court yard, that is said to have been paved of stone slabs, there is a stone block with an iron ring that covered an underground cistern. The dating for the building is somewhat vague, coming in somewhere between 9 BC and 22 AD. A Marcus Numistrius Fronto had a post-mortem inscription dedicated to him on the building, and he held the office of duumvir in 3 AD. For this reason it is believed that he was more likely to have been Eumachia's husband rather than her son, at the same time, there is an idealized statue of Eumachia dressed in a tunic, stola, and cloak in a niche toward the back of the building.

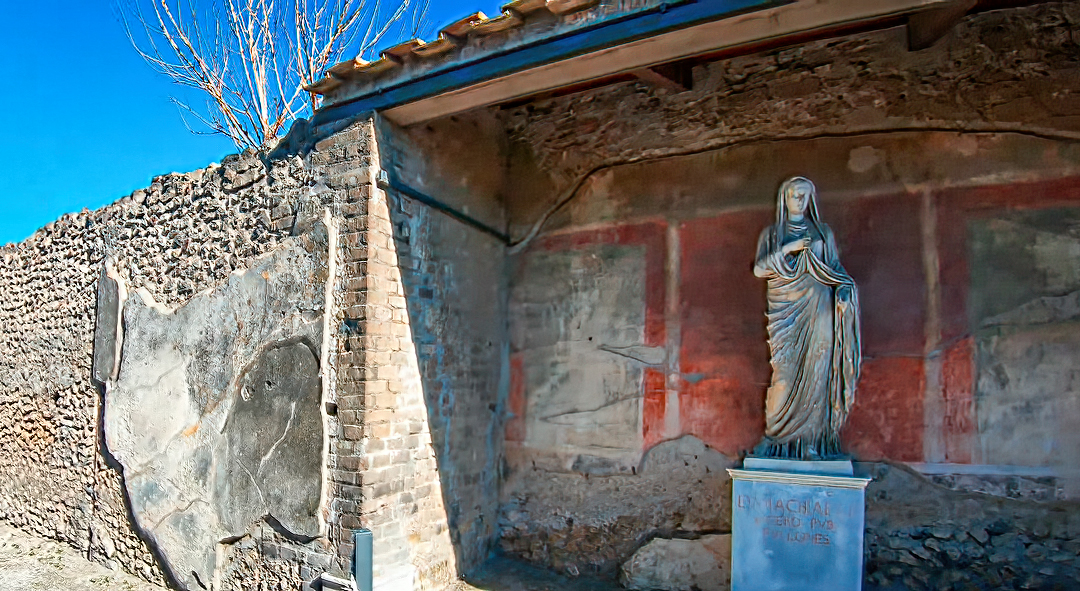
Statue of priestess Eumachia Building Pompeii

The purpose of the building is unknown to modern historians, with a number of possible purposes having been suggested, such as the following: A market place for goods, especially those sold by the fullers' guild of which Eumachia was the matron, a headquarters for the fullers' guild, where they washed, stretched and dyed wool, with the actual fulling done off site because of the smell, a headquarters for the fullers guild, where they did everything involved with the fulling process, with the idea that smells were of little concern in an ancient city before the invention of modern sewage, a private place for city businessmen, especially those engaged in the wool trade, a private place for transacting business and relaxation within the crypta and porticus, or a place for wool exchange where goods in large quantities were sold in auction.

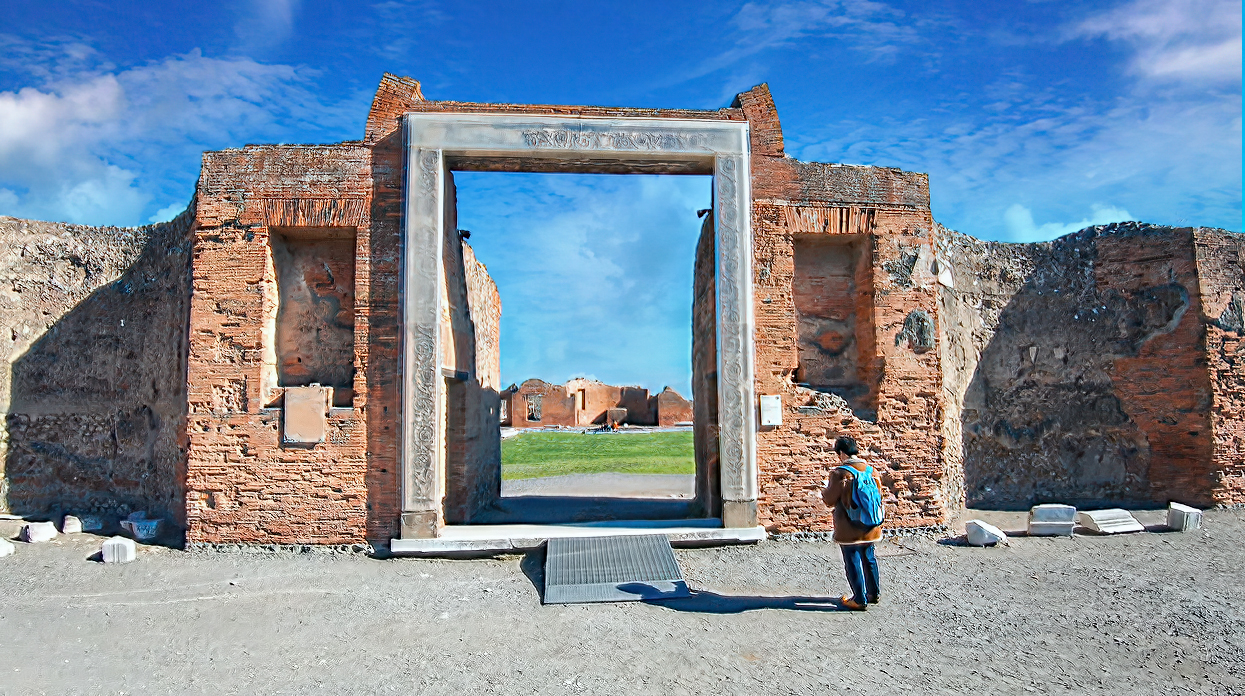
Entrance of The Building of Eumachia in Pompeii

Detailed archaeological investigation of the entrance suggests the building cannot have been used as an active marketplace. If the building of Eumachia was used as a cloth vendor or market, the entrances would be wider and placed in the middle of their respective walls. The entrances at Eumachia allowed for strict observance of those who entered from the N and main entrances through porter's lodges which is uncommon in markets such as Macellum and the Basilica.

The building as a whole is dedicated to Augustian Concord and Piety, thought to be in the image of Livia, one of the first women in Pompeii to have their own honorific statues. In front of the building, there are bases of what were once statues of Romulus and Aeneas. Paintings of the street of Abundance, where the building is located, show Aeneas leading his family from Troy and Romulus holding a Spolia opima.

== Euergetism ==
Using her immense wealth to finance a large public works project, Eumachia was engaging in the socio-political phenomenon of voluntary gift-giving known as euergetism, which influenced the wealthy people of her time period. In the early Roman empire, wealthy citizens increasingly donated their wealth to groups in their communities in return for public honors.

== Statue ==
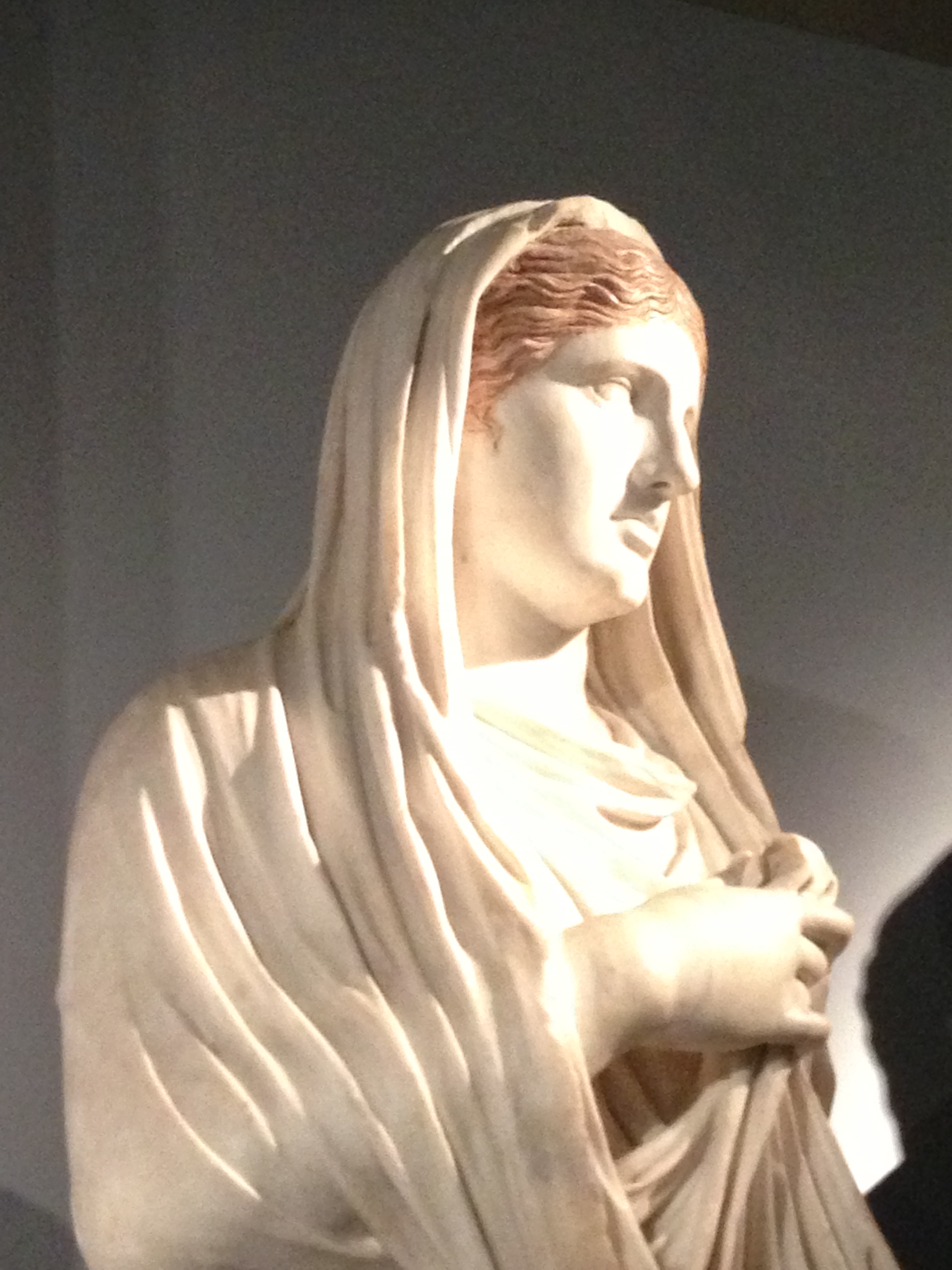
The statue of Eumachia on display at the British Museum during a 2013 exhibition

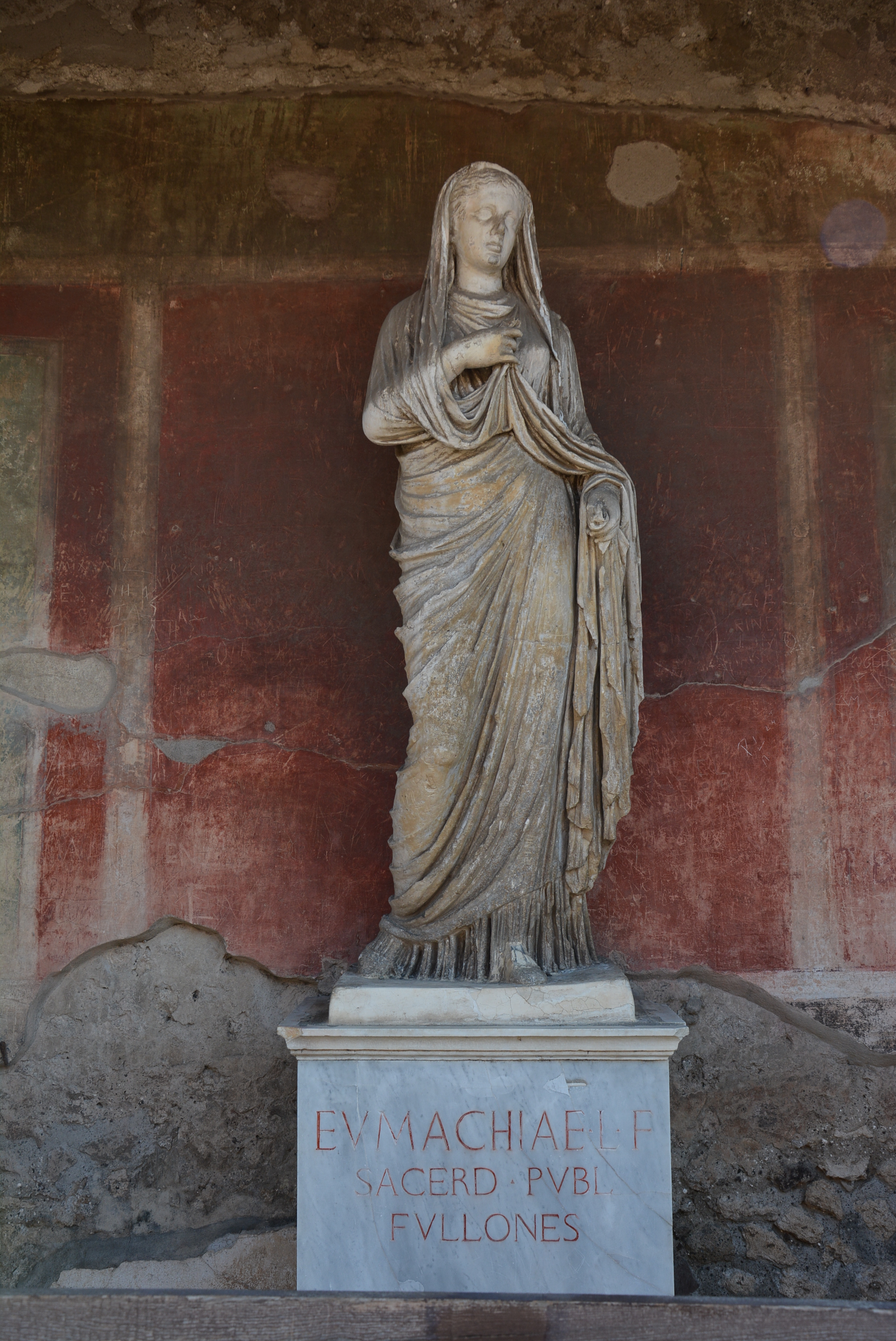
The statue of Eumachia at the Building in Pompeii. The inscription is present on the base.

Eumachia is dressed in a palla over a tunic and stola, in Hellenistic style. Eumachia has an idealized portrait. Palla, delicate women's poses, features, and material, was the aim of Rome's social control approach, which alludes to Livia, whose statues popularized the representation of the stola. Family members adopting aspects of the emperor's physiognomy emphasize family cohesion in imperial portraits. The wavy strands of hair separated in the center and pushed back from Eumachia's face imply that the image incorporates elements of the portraiture of imperial ladies. Moreover, her individualizing characteristics highlight the classicizing traits: her small mouth, slightly bent head revealing her delicate neck, and veiled hair. Her stance is quite dynamic in that her right knee is slightly bent, and her left foot is in the front, reflecting a trait that suggests more active body language in that she looks to step off her pedestal while having a closed form and wearing heavy garments. She is also gazing down on her audience that opposes the social mores and highlights the discrepancy between ideal and actual. Despite her wealth, she still had to balance the demands on her to adhere to conventional fashions with the more rebellious elements of her portrait.

The placing of Eumachia's honorific statue extends from the fountain to the porticos, as well as the high level of craftsmanship. Also, the idealizing portrait characteristics emphasize her link to the empress and her fulfillment of Augustan mores. Such references to the central authority solidified her elite reputation in Pompeii, emphasizing her importance to the fullers who sponsored the statue and the general public who benefited from the new complex. The rough translation of this inscription is: "to Eumachia, daughter of Lucius, public priestess of Pompeian Venus, from the fullers." See Corpus Inscriptionum Latinarum: "EVMACHIAE L F SACERD PVBL FVLLONES,".

A copy of the statue is in Pompeii while the original is at the Naples Archaeological Museum.
