= Cimolian earth =

Cimolian Earth (Greek: κιμωλια, Latin: terra simolia), also known as "cimolite", refers to a variety of clays used widely in the ancient world. These clays were used in medicine, in bleaching, and in the washing of clothes. They appear to be similar to Fuller's earth, and to Kaolin. A variety of colours of Cimolian Earth was known.

== Etymology ==
The name Cimolian earth was derived from Kimolos, an Aegean island north-east of Melos, also known as Argentiera.

== History ==
Of the earlier mentionings of cimolian earth, the mishna mentions kimonia -קימוניא- as part of a seven detergent formula used by the Jewish nation for the treatment of clothing tzoraath and niddah stains (tractate niddah, ch. 9). The Stockholm papyrus manuscript, found in 1828 in a tomb in Thebes and dated to 300 BC, describes a washing powder especially for wool. This powder was composed of aqueous soda solution, Cimolian Earth, dispersed in vinegar, slaked lime, fine clay, and caustic potash solution.

In Greek theatre, Aristophanes (c. 445-385 BC) was the first to mention Cimolian earth. In The Frogs (c. 405 BC) it is written:

"...the earth, which is brought

from the isle of Kimolos, and wrought

with nitre and lye into soap..."

Famous Roman author Pliny the Elder, in his Natural History, described two kinds of Cimolian earth, the one white, and the other "inclining to the tint of purpurissum". Both of these were employed for curing various medical conditions,

Both kinds, moistened with vinegar, have the effect of dispersing tumours and arresting defluxions. They are curative also of inflammatory swellings and imposthumes of the parotid glands; and, applied topically, they are good for affections of the spleen and pustules on the body. With the addition of aphronitrum, oil of cypros, and vinegar, they reduce swellings of the feet, care being taken to apply the lotion in the sun, and at the end of six hours to wash it off with salt and water.

Pliny also described the use of Cimolian earth for washing clothes.

A variety of colours were ascribed to Cimolian earth in ancient and medieval literature, most commonly white or greyish-white. It was noted that the greyish-white colour was "inclining to red, by exposure to air." This indicates the presence of unoxidized iron. Also black Cimolian Earth was known, as well as that of a greenish colour.

According to some exegetes of the Babylonian Talmud and the Mishnah, kimonia is to be identified with Cimolian Earth. However, Maimonides identifies kimonia with a natural "alkine" substance derived from plants.
