= Saxum =

In planetary geology, a saxum (/ˈsæksəm/, plural saxa) is a large surface boulder on an extraterrestrial body. So far the term has been used for:

- 162173 Ryugu § Saxa
- 101955 Bennu § IAU named features
- Dimorphos § Surface

Saxum is the Latin word for a rock. The feature name was introduced in 2019 for the Hayabusa 2 asteroid mission to Ryugu.
