= 2017 VW13 =

Near-Earth asteroid

2017 VW_{13}
Discovery
- Discovered by: ATLAS-MLO
- Discovery date: 13 November 2017

Designations
- Minor planet category: Apollo; NEO

Orbital characteristics
- Epoch 23 March 2018 (JD 2458200.5)
- Uncertainty parameter 4
- Observation arc: 118 days
- Aphelion: 3.3707 AU (Q)
- Perihelion: 0.96118 AU (q)
- Semi-major axis: 2.1659 AU (a)
- Eccentricity: 0.556231
- Orbital period (sidereal): 3.19 yr
- Mean anomaly: 47.813° (M)
- Inclination: 11.4909°
- Longitude of ascending node: 45.705° (Ω)
- Argument of perihelion: 337.12° (ω)
- Earth MOID: 0.002 AU (300,000 km)

Physical characteristics
- Dimensions: ~250 m (820 ft) (assumed) (Note: Diameter estimate based on an absolute magnitude (H) of 20.7 and an assumed albedo of 0.15.)
- Absolute magnitude (H): 20.7

2017 VW_{13} is an Apollo near-Earth asteroid roughly 250 meters (820 feet) in diameter. It was discovered on 13 November 2017 when the asteroid was about 0.069 AU (10,300,000 km; 6,400,000 mi) from Earth and had a solar elongation of 110 degrees. Ten days earlier, on 3 November 2017, the asteroid had passed 0.02818 AU (4,216,000 km; 2,619,000 mi) from Earth, but only had a solar elongation of 65 degrees.

== 2001 Earth approach ==
Calculating the orbit backwards it is known that the asteroid made a close approach to Earth on 8 November 2001. The nominal (best-fit) solution shows that the asteroid passed about 0.001 AU (150,000 km; 93,000 mi) from Earth. But due to the uncertainties in the trajectory, the asteroid could have passed as far as 0.008 AU (1,200,000 km; 740,000 mi) from Earth. The observation arc is only 118 days, but as the observation arc becomes longer the precise distance of the 2001 approach will become better constrained.

Generic size comparison of other large asteroids that passed less than 0.5 LD from Earth
| Asteroid | Absolute magnitude (H) | Generic diameter estimate assuming albedo = 0.15 |
|---|---|---|
| 2017 VW_{13} | 20.7 | 250 meters |
| 2002 MN | 23.6 | 66 meters |
| 2018 GE3 | 23.8 | 60 meters |
