= Amihan (mythology) =

Bird deity from Philippine folklore

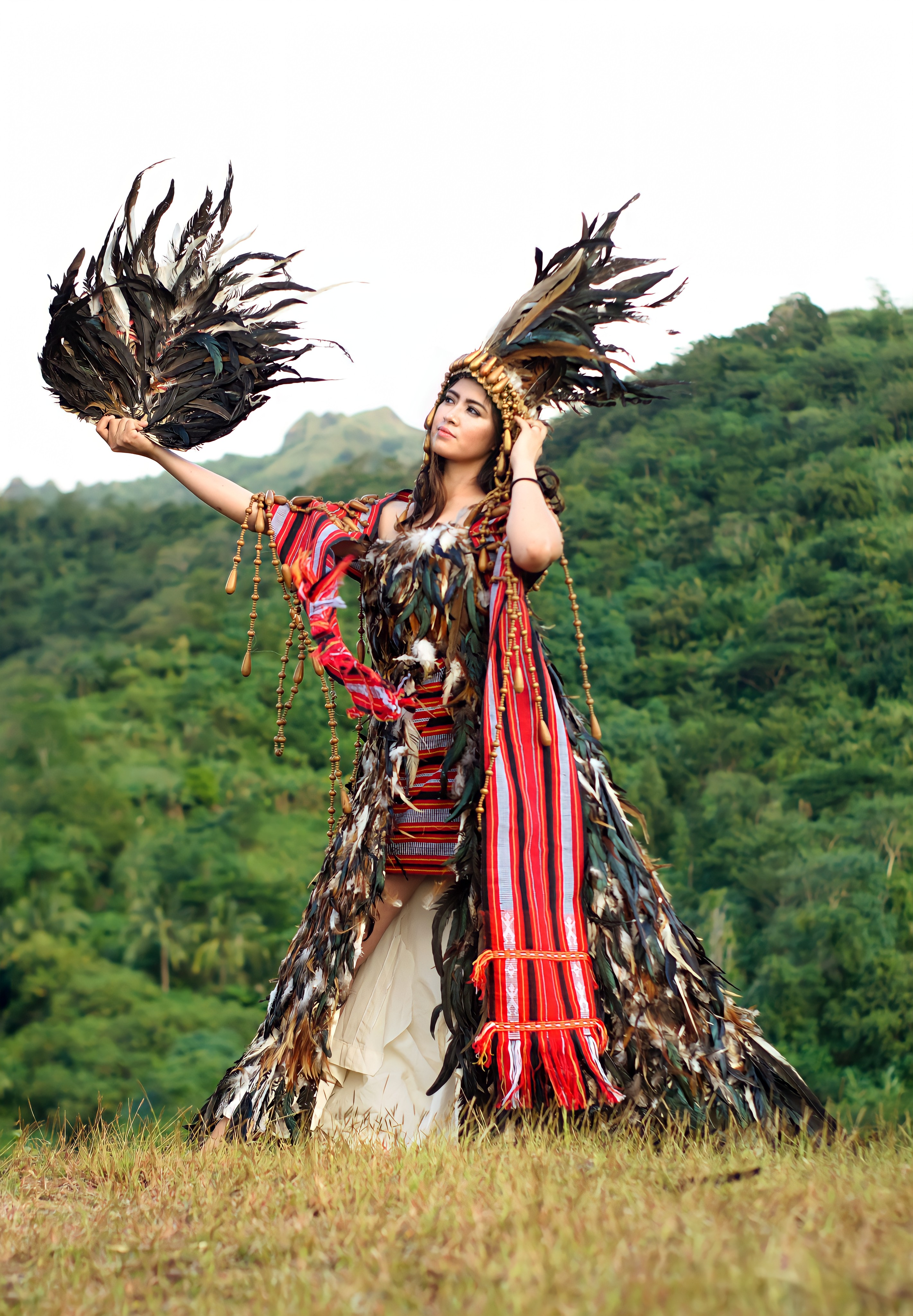
A locally designed attire depicting Amihan

Amihan is a deity that is depicted as a bird in the Philippine mythology. According to the Tagalog folklore, Amihan is the first creature to inhabit the universe, along with the gods called Bathala and Aman Sinaya. In the legend, Amihan is described as a bird who saved the first human beings, Malakas and Maganda, from a bamboo plant.

== Amihan and Habagat in folktales and myths ==
=== Wind Lovers ===
Amihan is the personification of the Northeast Wind in Philippine mythology. In one tale, Habagat fell in love with Amihan and competed against other wind gods, including his fiercest rival, Buhawi (Typhoon), in a contest of speed and strength. After emerging victorious, he took Amihan to Himpapawiran, where they ruled together.

=== The Children of Bathala ===
In other versions instead of lovers they are siblings. Amihan is also depicted with Habagat which explains the wind patterns in the country. In one legend, they are depicted as children of the supreme deity Bathala. They are allowed by their father to play in turns, every half a year, since having the two play together causes destruction in the land. Amihan is depicted as the gentler sister while Habagat is depicted as the more active brother.

=== Rival Titans ===
In another legend, Amihan is depicted as a giant who is at war with another giant Habagat.

=== The Creation myth ===
In Tagalog folklore, Amihan was one of the first beings in the universe, alongside Bathala and Aman Sinaya. She is the personification of the northeast wind, often depicted as a beautiful, long-haired woman who brings cool breezes and protects fishermen. Amihan played a crucial role in the creation myth, where she started a war between Bathala (Sky God) and Aman Sinaya (Sea God). Taking the form of a bird, she flew between them, bringing peace and helping shape the Philippine archipelago.

== In culture ==
Amihan has multiple versions in Philippine mythology due to the country's cultural diversity and the evolving nature of oral traditions. In one story, she is the object of affection in a wind contest between Habagat and other wind gods.In another, she is depicted as the gentler sister of Habagat, with both winds taking turns in their role to avoid destruction. In some legends, Amihan is portrayed as a giant at war with Habagat. In the creation myth, she plays a crucial between the gods Bathala (Sky God) and Aman Sinaya (Sea God) and helps shape the Philippine archipelago.These variations reflect the different interpretations of Amihan across regions and communities in the Philippines.
