= 2017 in science =

A number of significant scientific events occurred in 2017. The United Nations declared 2017 the International Year of Sustainable Tourism for Development.

== Events ==
=== January ===
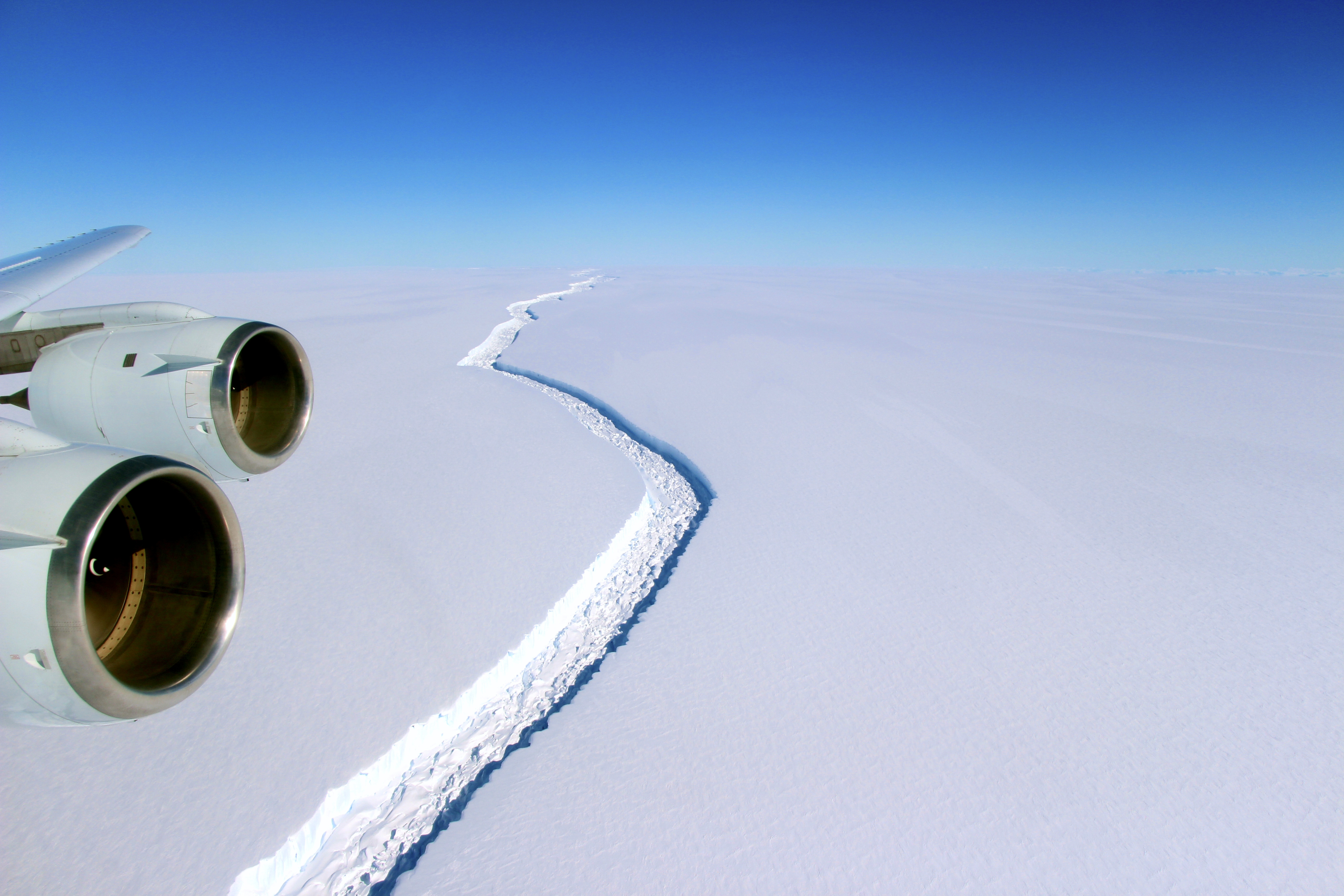
6 January: A portion of the Larsen C ice shelf reportedly in danger of breaking off

- 4 January
  - A study published in the journal Science Advances casts further doubt on the existence of a recent "pause" in global warming, with more evidence that ocean temperatures have been underestimated.
  - After 60 wins and 0 losses over 7 days, Google reveals that a mysterious player of Go, named "Master", is actually an improved version of its AlphaGo AI.
  - Researchers at Michigan State University demonstrate a chemical compound and potential new drug able to stop the spread of melanoma by 90%.
  - NASA announces its two choices for the next Discovery Program missions – the Lucy mission, to visit several asteroids, including six Jupiter Trojans; and the Psyche mission, to visit the large metallic asteroid 16 Psyche.
- 5 January – A Japanese insurance firm, Fukoku Mutual Life Insurance, announces that 34 of its office workers will be replaced with IBM's Watson AI.
- 6 January
  - A large portion of the Larsen C ice shelf is reported to be on the verge of breaking away from Antarctica. It is expected to become one of the top 10 biggest icebergs ever recorded, leaving the whole shelf vulnerable to future collapse, which would raise global sea levels by 10cm.
  - Researchers at MIT design one of the strongest lightweight materials known, by compressing and fusing flakes of graphene. The new material is highly porous. Computer simulations predict it is possible to make materials with a density of just 5 percent of steel, but 10 times stronger.
  - NASA scientists release an image (also see related comparison image) of the Earth and Moon as viewed 127 million miles away from the planet Mars by the Mars Reconnaissance Orbiter. (related image taken by the Curiosity rover on the surface of Mars)

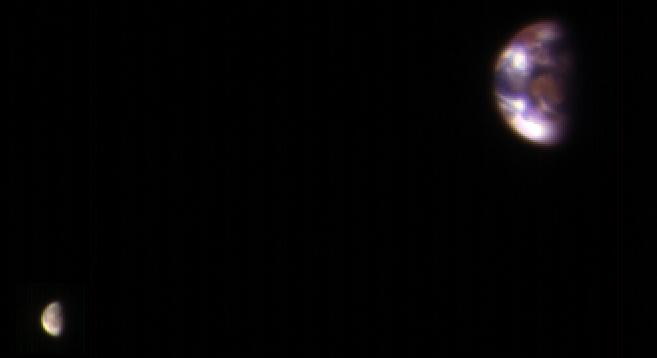
6 January: The Earth and Moon as viewed 127 million miles away from the planet Mars by the MRO.

- 9 January – Researchers at King's College London report a way of using an Alzheimer's drug to stimulate the renewal of living stem cells in tooth pulp.
- 10 January – Researchers discover that glia, not neurons, are most affected by brain aging.
- 11 January
  - A new species of gibbon, named Hoolock tianxing, is identified in southwest China.
  - Carnegie Mellon University announces "Libratus", an artificial intelligence program designed to beat humans at poker.
- 12 January – Scientists at the Scripps Research Institute report the discovery of TZAP, a protein that binds the ends of chromosomes and determines how long telomeres can be.
- 14 January
  - Researchers at the University of Sydney use big data to predict how a quantum system will change and to prevent its breakdown from occurring.
  - SpaceX resumes flights, following a launch pad explosion in September 2016. A reusable Falcon 9 rocket successfully delivers 10 satellites into orbit for a client, Iridium, before returning to a landing pad in the ocean.
- 16 January
  - Astronomers working on the Japanese Akatsuki space probe mission report detecting a possible gravity wave that occurred on the planet Venus in December 2015.
  - Researchers publish evidence that humans first entered North America in around 24,000 BP (Before Present), during the height of the last ice age. This is 10,000 years earlier than previously thought.

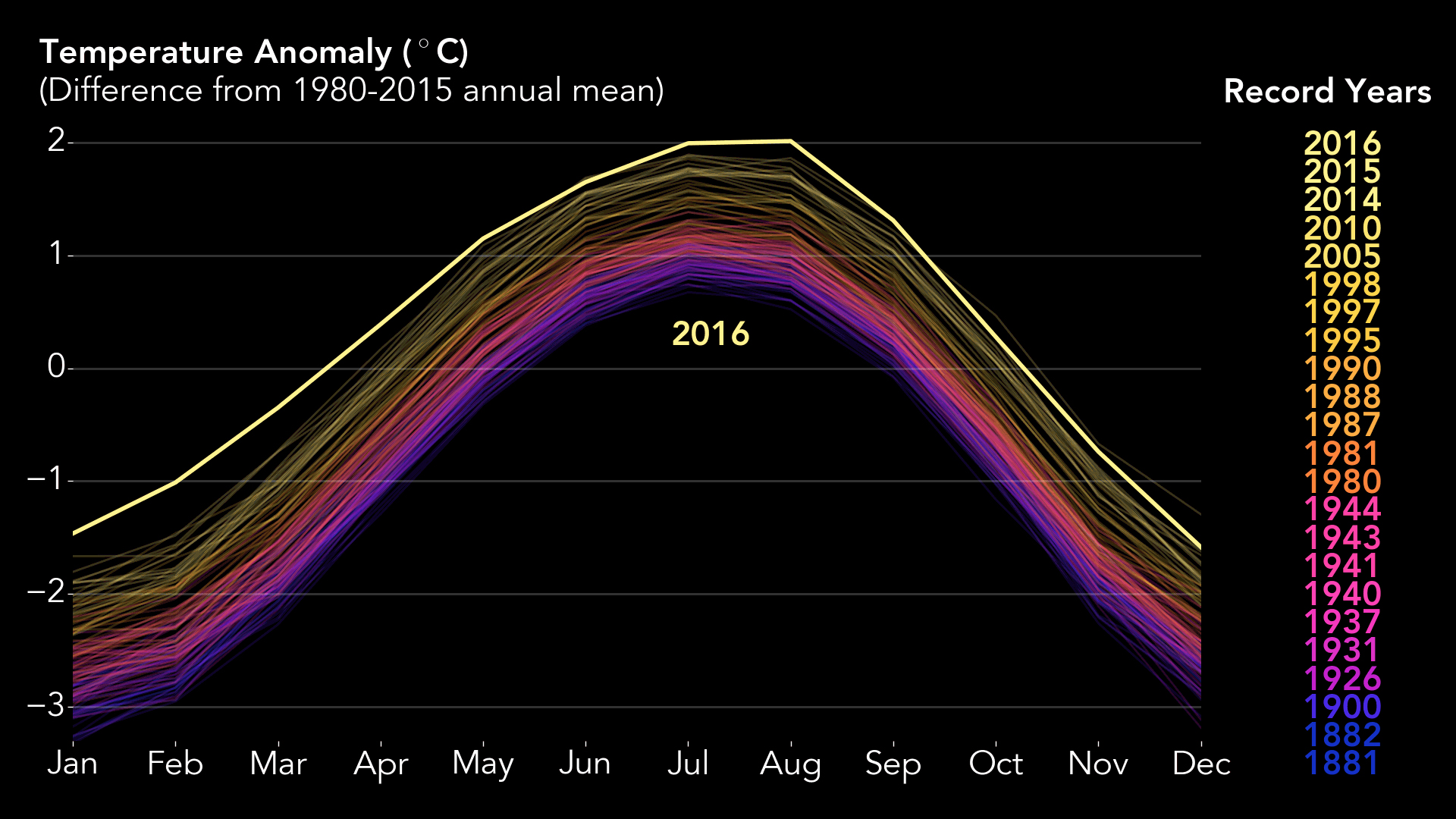
18 January: NASA and NOAA confirm 2016 was the hottest year on record globally

- 17 January – The Chinese government announces plans for the first prototype exascale supercomputer by the end of the year.
- 18 January
  - Researchers at Harvard develop a customisable "soft robot" that fits around a heart and helps it beat, potentially offering a new treatment option for patients with heart failure.
  - Independent analyses by NASA and the National Oceanic and Atmospheric Administration (NOAA) show that 2016 was the hottest year on record, at 0.99 °C (1.78 °F) above the mid-20th century global mean average. This follows record warmth in the two preceding years 2015 and 2014.
- 19 January
  - A study published in Nature warns that some of the most important crops in the U.S. are at risk of "abrupt and substantial yield losses" from rising temperatures later this century, with harvests potentially declining by 20% for wheat, 40% for soybean and almost 50% for maize.
  - Researchers at Northwestern University develop an AI system that performs at human levels on a standard visual intelligence test.

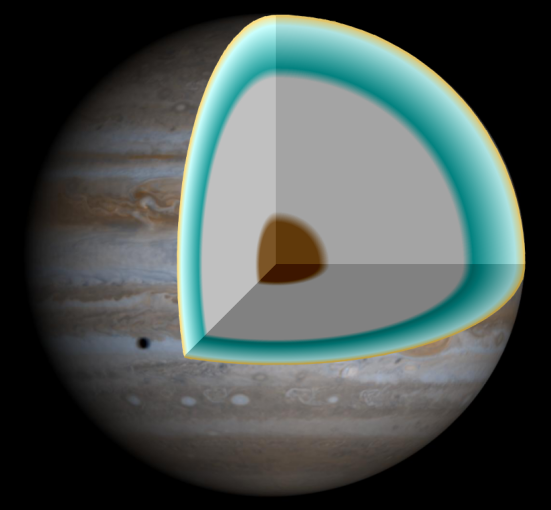
26 January: Scientists at Harvard report the first synthesis of metallic hydrogen, normally found inside gas giants like Jupiter.

- 23 January
  - Researchers demonstrate a prototype 3D printer that can print fully functional human skin.
  - Scientists at the Scripps Research Institute create the first stable semisynthetic organism. This can hold two synthetic bases, called X and Y, in its genetic code indefinitely. The team says it could lead to entirely new life forms using synthetic DNA, with many potential uses in medicine.
- 26 January
  - Researchers at the Salk Institute create the first human-pig hybrid embryo, containing genetic information from both species.
  - Scientists at Harvard report creating a small amount of metallic hydrogen for the first time, a century after it was theorised. The claim is disputed.
- 27 January – A report from the EU's Joint Research Centre concludes that if global temperatures rise by 4 °C, the flood risk in countries representing more than 70% of the global population and of the global GDP will increase by more than 500%.
- 30 January – News reports that a new safe battery has been invented. It is based on solid lithium, and is claimed to have twice the storage capacity of lithium-ion batteries. It is featured on a newly released PBS NOVA TV program entitled Search for the Super Battery.

=== February ===
- 1 February
  - Researchers led by the University of Sussex publish the first practical blueprint for how to build a quantum computer.
  - Researchers develop a new blue-phase liquid crystal that could triple the sharpness of TVs, computer screens, and other displays while also reducing the power needed to run the device.

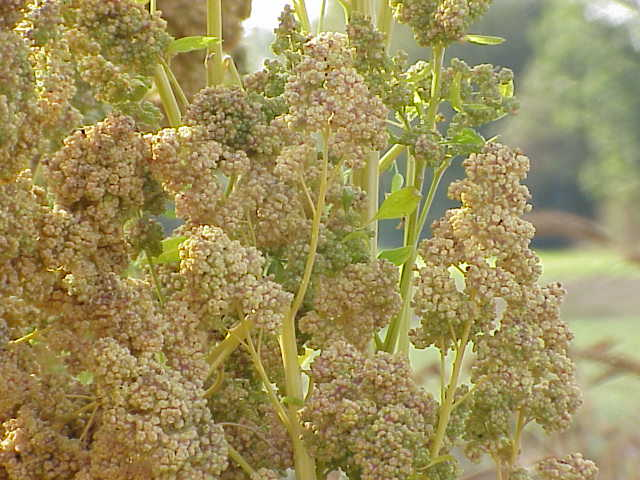
8 February: Genome of Quinoa food crop is decoded.

- 6 February – The first stable helium compound is synthesized, Na_{2}He. Helium is the most unreactive element.
- 7 February
  - A mysterious "white dwarf pulsar" is announced, the first known star of its kind, located 380 light years from Earth.
  - Asteroid 2017 BQ6 passed within 6.6 lunar distances of Earth at 6:36 UT.
- 8 February
  - The genome of the quinoa food crop is decoded by researchers at King Abdullah University of Science and Technology.
  - NASA publishes a report outlining the mission goals of an uncrewed Europa surface lander and which instruments the probe may need.
- 9 February – Researchers at Japan's National Institute of Advanced Industrial Science and Technology demonstrate a robotic drone bee able to pollinate flowers.
- 10 February
  - A study in the journal Anthropocene Review concludes that human activity is changing the climate 170 times faster than natural processes.
  - A study by the University of Buffalo, using four decades of evidence, finds no link between immigration and higher rates of crime.
- 14 February – A committee from the US National Academy of Sciences and the National Academy of Medicine gives cautious backing to gene editing of human embryos.

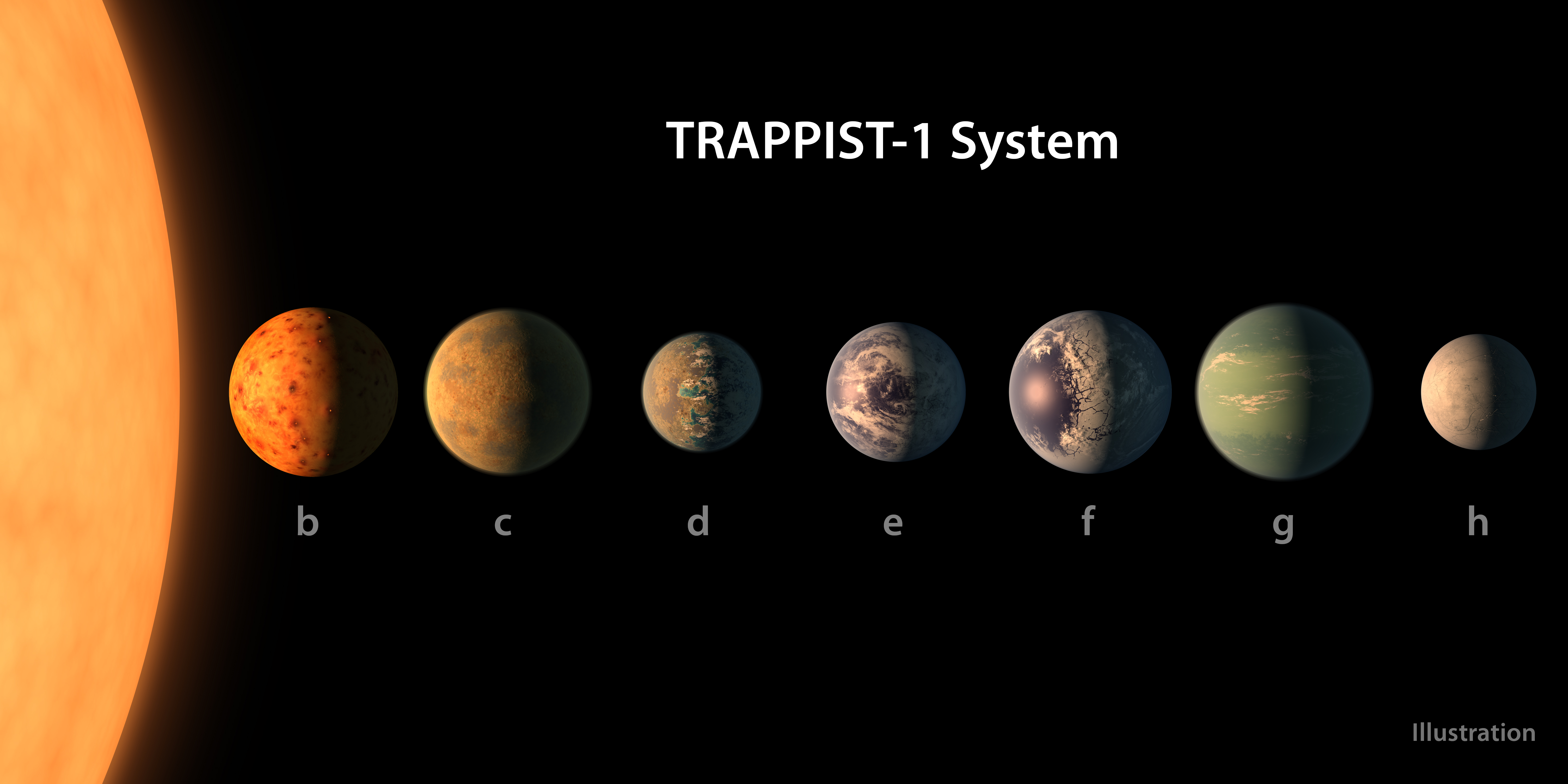
22 February: Discovery of seven Earth-sized exoplanets, which may all be in the habitable zone, orbiting TRAPPIST-1, an ultra-cool dwarf star, announced.

- 15 February – A study published in Nature finds that oxygen levels in the oceans have declined by 2% globally in the last 50 years, due to warming and stratification.
- 16 February
  - NASA's Dawn mission finds evidence of organic material on Ceres, the first clear detection of organic molecules from orbit on a main belt body. (related image)
  - Researchers from the University of Texas at Austin develop ultra-flexible, nanoelectronic thread (NET) brain probes, designed to achieve more reliable long-term neural recording than existing probes and without causing scar formation when implanted.
- 21 February – Scientists describe a technique to grow large quantities of inner ear progenitor cells that convert into hair cells, which could potentially treat hearing loss.
- 22 February – Astronomers announce the discovery of seven Earth-sized exoplanets, which may all be in the habitable zone, orbiting TRAPPIST-1, an ultra-cool dwarf star, slightly larger than the planet Jupiter, located about 40 light-years from Earth.

=== March ===
- 1 March – Researchers report evidence of possibly the oldest forms of life on Earth. Putative fossilized microorganisms were discovered in hydrothermal vent precipitates in the Nuvvuagittuq belt of Quebec, Canada, that may have lived as early as 4.280 billion years ago, not long after the oceans formed 4.4 billion years ago, and not long after the formation of the Earth 4.54 billion years ago.

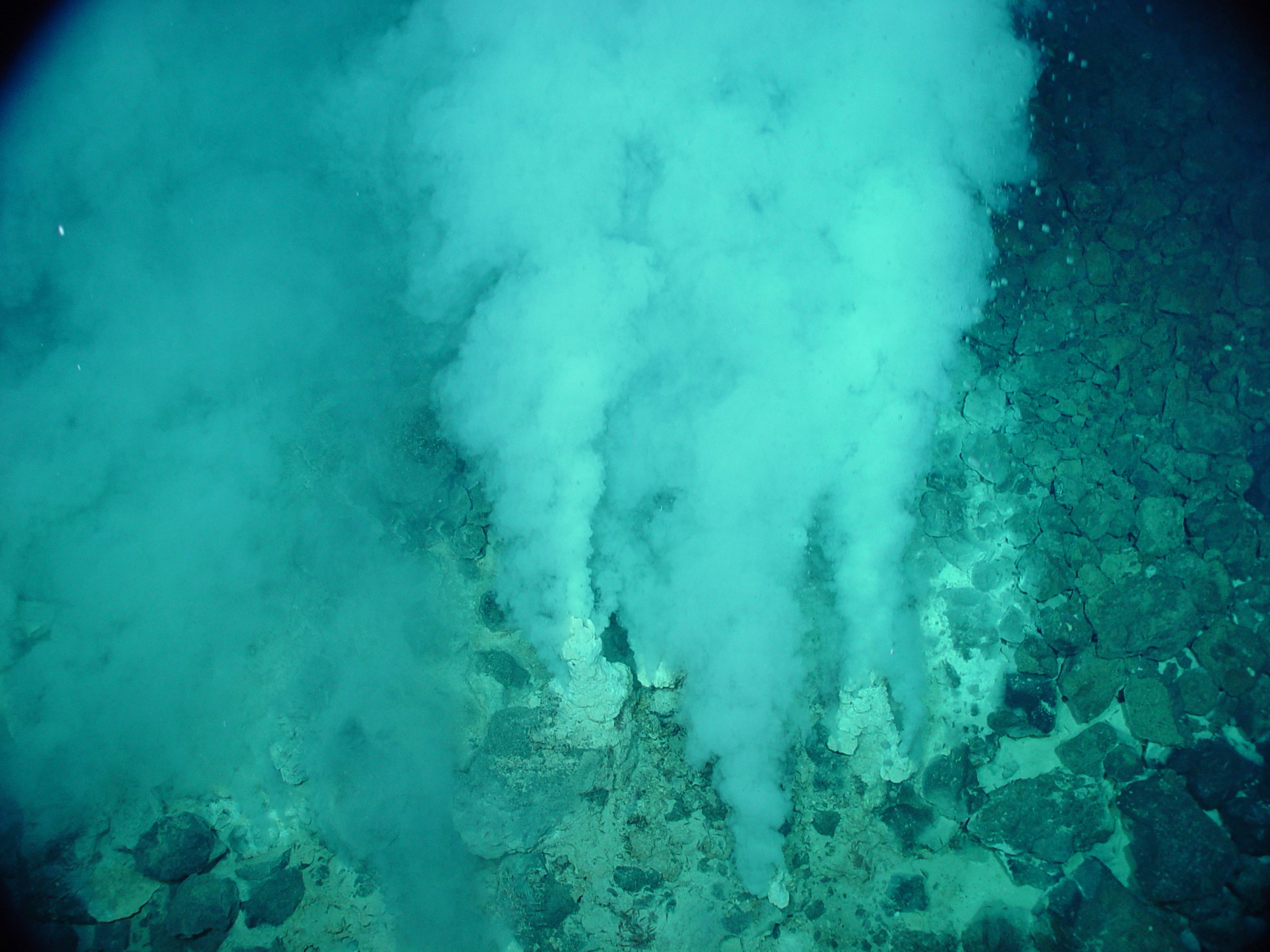
1 March: Evidence of possibly the oldest forms of life on Earth found in hydrothermal vent precipitates.

- 2 March – The University of Alberta announces details of DeepStack, a new artificial intelligence program able to beat professional human players at poker for the first time.
- 6 March – IBM announces "IBM Q", an initiative to build commercially available universal quantum computing systems.
- 7 March
  - The Sentinel-2B satellite is launched as part of the European Space Agency's Copernicus programme.
  - NASA's Cassini mission reveals new images of Pan, a small moon of Saturn, which is now shown to have a bizarre 'flying saucer' shape.
- 8 March – Scientists at the University of Texas report a new phase of matter, dubbed a time crystal, in which atoms move in a pattern that repeats in time rather than in space.
- 9 March
  - Researchers at the Institute for Basic Science publish details of a single atom memory storage system.
  - The CDH2 gene is found to be implicated in sudden death among young people and athletes.
  - A study by the Harvard-Smithsonian Center for Astrophysics suggests that fast radio bursts in distant galaxies could be evidence of advanced alien technology.
- 10 March
  - Scientists report that extraterrestrial dust particles have been identified to be all over planet Earth. According to one of the researchers, "Once I knew what to look for, I found them everywhere."
  - A study published in Science Advances concludes that the world's oceans are warming 13% faster than previously thought, and accelerating.
- 16 March – Scientists report that a potential drug candidate, trodusquemine, can restore some heart muscle function after a heart attack. As of 2017, no drug exists that is able to do this.

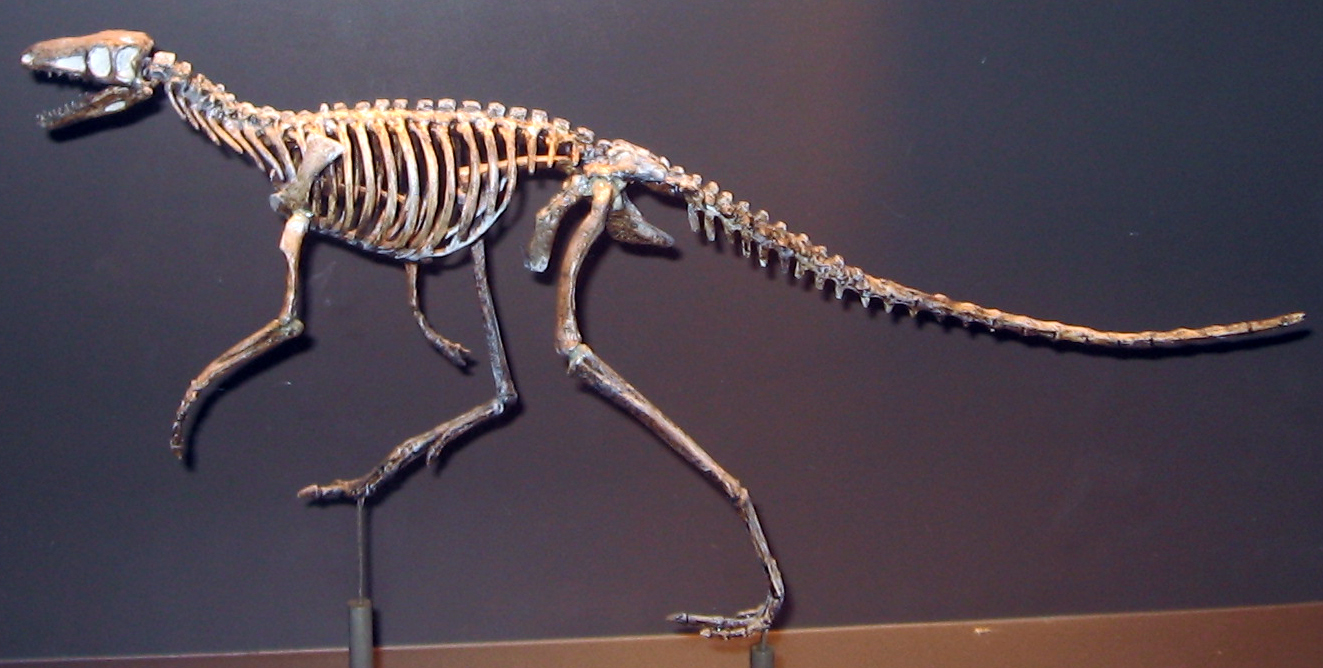
22 March: New way of classifying the dinosaur family tree reported; original dinosaurs were possibly small 2-footed omnivorous animals with large grasping hands.

- 17 March
  - A new drug, evolocumab, is shown to prevent heart attacks and strokes by dramatically cutting bad cholesterol.
  - A report by the International Energy Agency (IEA) finds that CO_{2} emissions have remained flat for the third year in a row, despite continued global economic growth.
- 22 March
  - Scientists report a new way of classifying the dinosaur family tree, based on newer and more evidence than available earlier. According to the new classification, the original dinosaurs, arising 200 million years ago, were small, two-footed omnivorous animals with large grasping hands. Descendants (for the non-avian dinosaurs) lasted until 66 million years ago.
  - NASA reports that sea ice extent has reached record lows at both the Arctic and Antarctic.
- 23 March – Dutch scientists report a drug that can reverse aspects of ageing in old mice – restoring their stamina, coat of fur and even some organ function – by flushing out "senescent" cells in the body that have stopped dividing. Human trials are planned.
- 24 March – Scientists at the University of New South Wales publish details of experiments on mice that suggest a treatment is possible for DNA damage from aging and radiation, based on the metabolite NAD+.
- 27 March – Scientists in Australia announce the discovery of the world's largest dinosaur footprint, measuring 1.7 metres (5 ft 7 in) long. The previous record-holder was about 1 metre (3 ft 3 in) long.
- 30 March – SpaceX conducts the world's first reflight of an orbital class rocket.

=== April ===
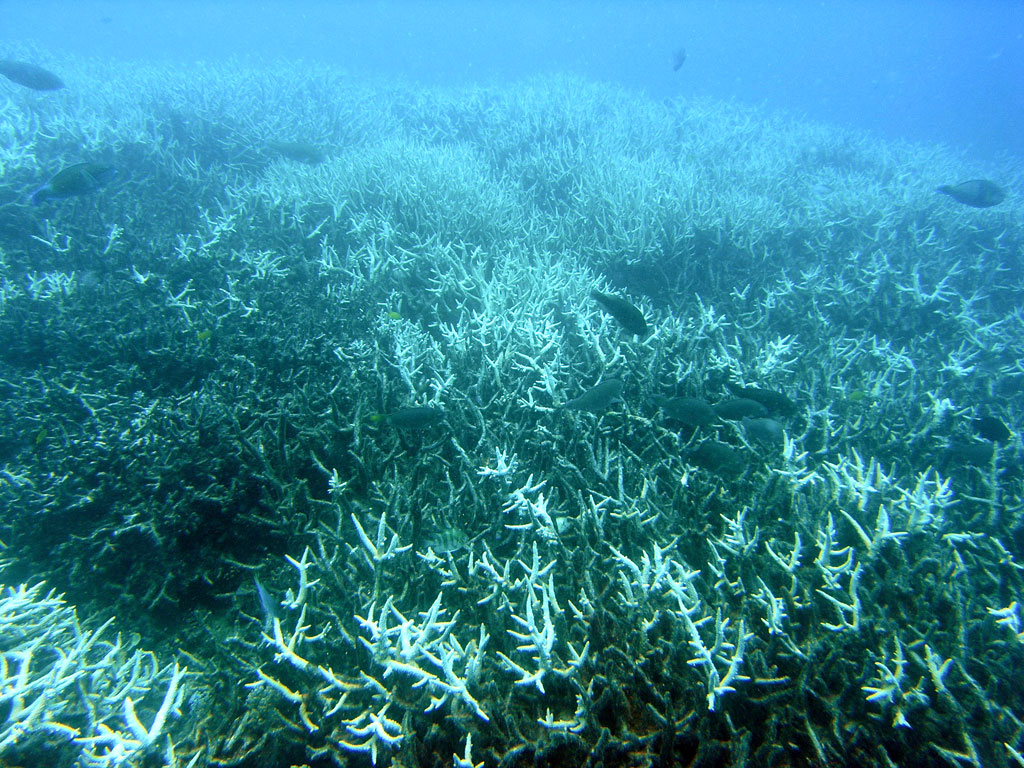
10 April: The Great Barrier Reef is hit by a second consecutive mass coral bleaching event.

- 3 April – Researchers at the University of Manchester demonstrate a graphene-based sieve able to filter seawater, which could improve desalination technologies.
- 10 April
  - Australia's Great Barrier Reef is reported to be experiencing a second consecutive mass coral bleaching event, affecting two-thirds of its area.
  - Researchers at Washington State University demonstrate a fluid with negative mass.
- 11 April – The telescopes of the Event Horizon Telescope finish data-taking in their attempt to image the region close to a black hole. Data analysis is expected to take several months.
- 12 April – University of Waterloo researchers capture the first composite image of a galaxies-connecting dark matter bridge.
- 13 April
  - NASA scientists announce that molecular hydrogen has been detected in plumes erupting from Enceladus, moon of the planet Saturn, suggesting possible hydrothermal activity, and the possible consequent existence of primitive life forms.
  - The University of California, Berkeley, creates a device that pulls water from dry air, powered only by the Sun. Even under conditions of relatively low (20–30 percent) humidity, it is able to produce 2.8 liters of water over a 12-hour period.
- 19 April – Astronomers report the discovery of LHS 1140b, a rocky "super-Earth" in the habitable zone of a red dwarf star, LHS 1140, which astronomers say is among the best ever candidates in the search for extraterrestrial life.

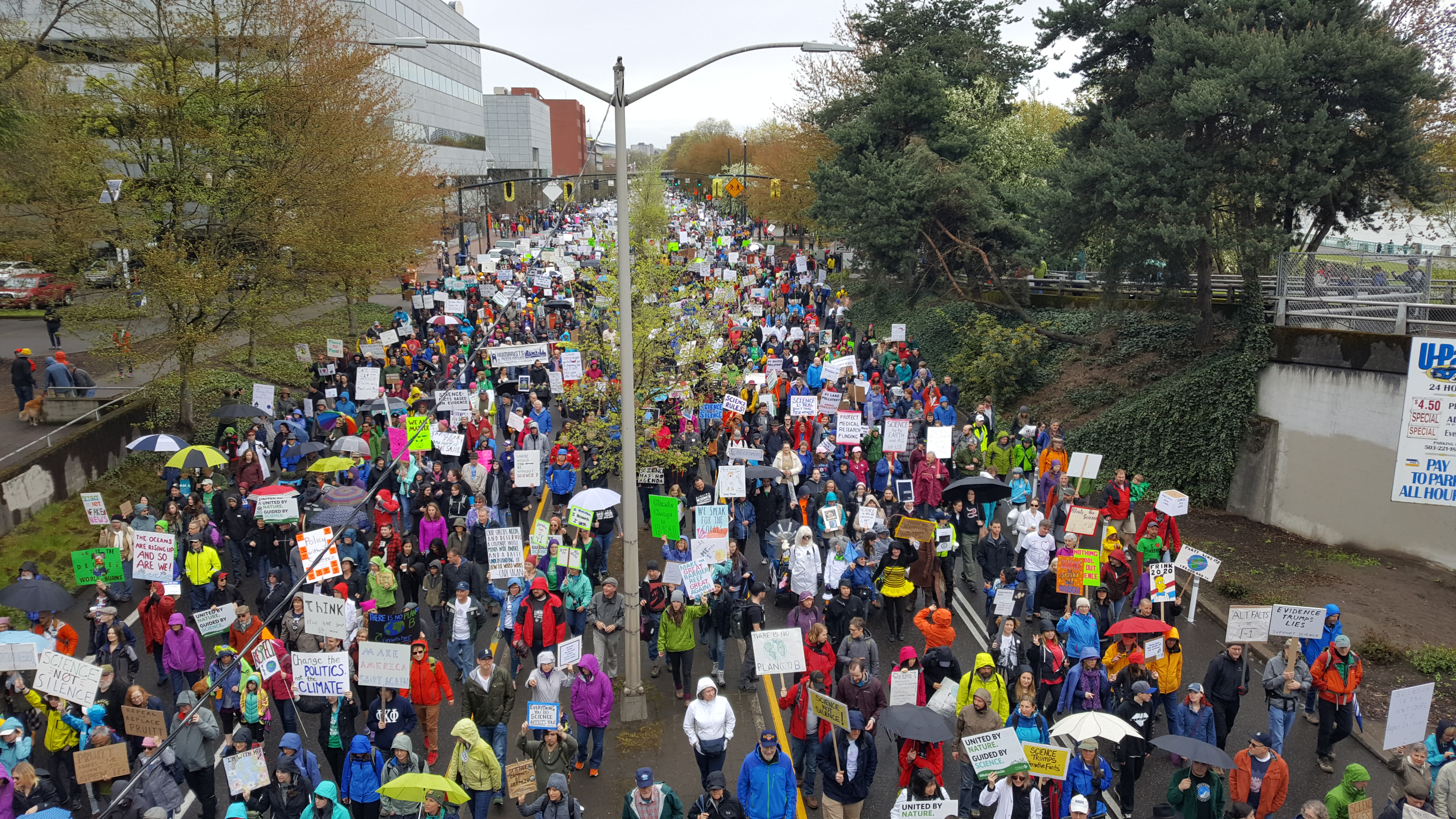
22 April: March for Science occurred in more than 600 cities around the world on Earth Day.

- 20 April – Researchers from the Medical Research Council (United Kingdom) led by Giovanna Mallucci identify two drugs, trazodone and dibenzoylmethane (DBM), that could potentially block cell death in all neurodegenerative brain diseases.
- 22 April – The March for Science takes place, timed to coincide with Earth Day.
- 24 April – Wax moth larvae are reported to be able to biodegrade polyethylene, one of the toughest, most resilient, and most used plastics. The creatures may be a solution to the growing problem of plastic waste.
- 25 April – Researchers in the U.S. demonstrate an artificial womb-like device on lambs, which could one day be used for saving premature human babies.
- 26 April – Scientists report evidence suggesting that ancient humans were present at the Cerutti Mastodon site on the North American continent 130,000 years ago, much earlier than 15,000 years ago, thought previously based on genetic studies.

=== May ===
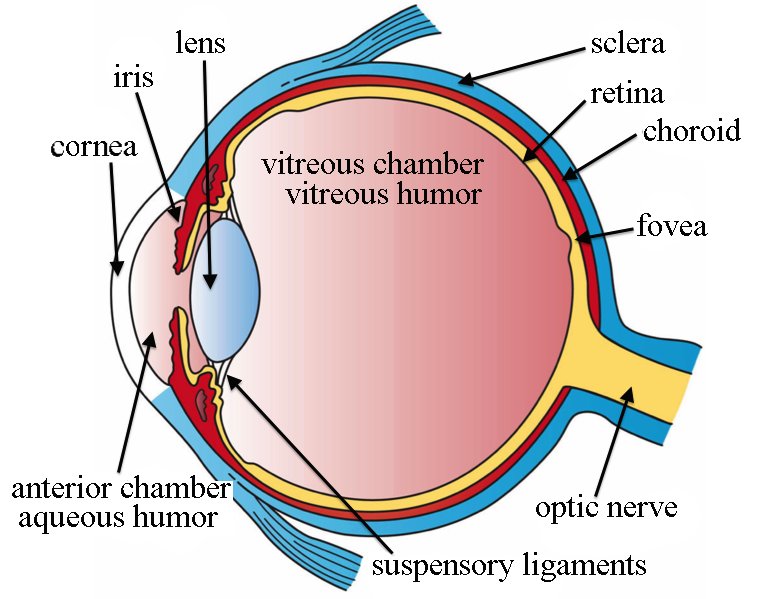
4 May: First synthetic retina reported to have been created.

- 1 May – The University of Utah reveals a new robotic drill system for greatly speeding up surgical procedures. One type of complex craniofacial surgery could be done in a fiftieth of the normal time, decreasing from two hours to just two and a half minutes.
- 4 May
  - The European x-ray free electron laser (XFEL) produces its first beams of x-rays.
  - The first synthetic retina using soft biological tissues is created by a student at the University of Oxford.
- 9 May
  - Scientists report newer findings, two adults and a child, of Homo naledi, an extinct species of hominin, in a second chamber, named "Lesedi", of the "Rising Star Cave" system. This second chamber is near the first earlier chamber, named "Dinaledi". In addition, remains of Homo naledi have been reported to be dated "between 236,000 and 335,000 years ago".
  - Scientists publish evidence that the earliest known life on land may have been found in 3.48-billion-year-old geyserite and other related mineral deposits (often found around hot springs and geysers) uncovered in the Pilbara Craton of Western Australia.

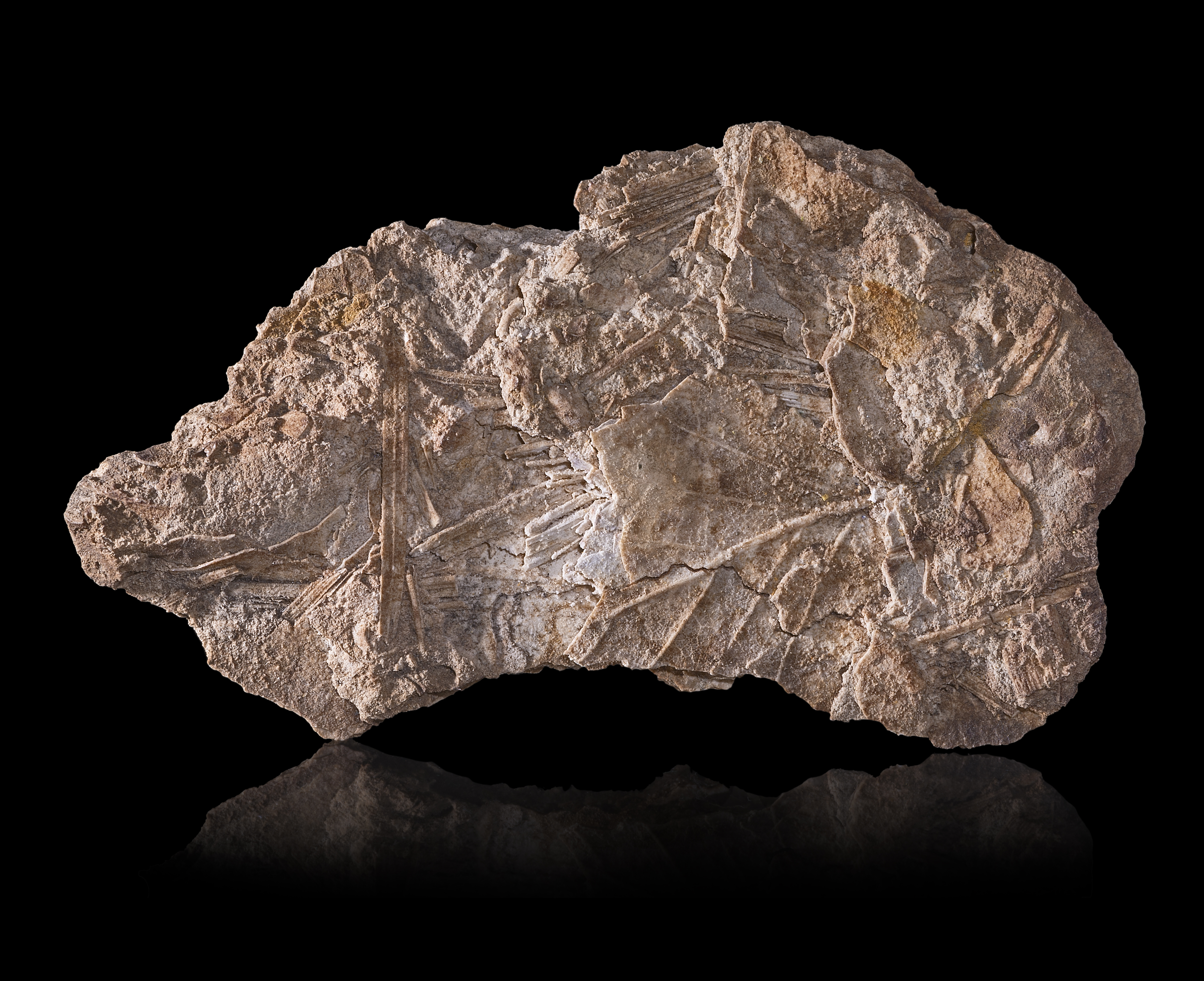
9 May: Evidence of the earliest known life on land may have been found in 3.48-billion-year-old geyserite.

- 10 May
  - Researchers at the University of Minnesota demonstrate a 3D-printed 'bionic skin' that could give robots a sense of touch, or lead to electronics printed on real human skin.
  - A study of nearly 6,000 adults finds that high levels of physical activity equate to a nine-year biological aging advantage. Those who engaged in a minimum of 30 to 40 minutes of running, five days a week, were found to have longer telomere lengths.
- 15 May – Researchers report that glints of light observed from Earth, seen as twinkling from an orbiting satellite a million miles away, have been found to be reflected light from ice crystals in the atmosphere. The technology used to determine this may be useful in studying the atmospheres of distant worlds, including those of exoplanets.
- 16 May
  - SESAME, a synchrotron light source in Jordan built by a collaboration including Israel, the Palestinian National Authority and Iran, is inaugurated.
  - ARM and the Center for Sensorimotor Neural Engineering (CSNE) announce plans to develop a "brain-implantable" system-on-a-chip (SoC) for bi-directional brain-computer interfaces (BBCI). The 10-year project is aimed at solving neurodegenerative disorders.
- 17 May – Human blood stem cells are grown in the laboratory for the first time by researchers at Boston Children's Hospital.

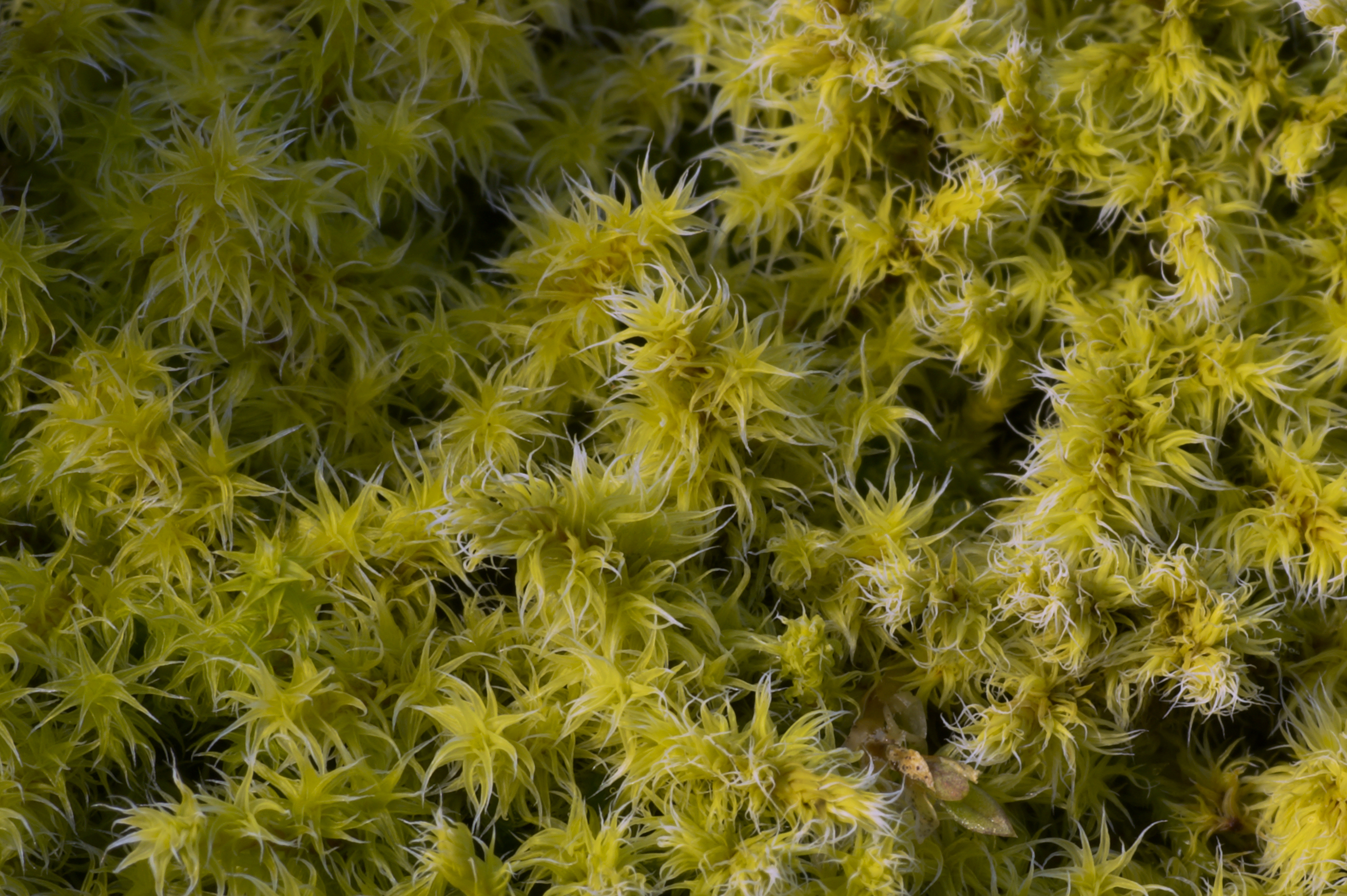
18 May: Rapid greening of the Antarctica region reported, based on a significant increase in the growth rate of moss.

- 18 May – Researchers publish evidence of a rapid greening in the Antarctica region over the last 50 years. Mosses that once grew less than 1mm a year are now found to be growing more than 3mm a year on average.
  - An Australian-Chinese research team creates the world's thinnest hologram, fabricated using a simple and fast direct laser writing system, with potential for use in a range of electronic products.
- 20 May – Astronomers report that Tabby's Star, about 1,300 light-years from Earth, has again begun dimming unusually; several explanations have been considered, including the possibility that intelligent extraterrestrial life may have been constructing a Dyson swarm. More dimming events happened in the following months.
  Update (Tabby's Star): as of 5 September 2017, a new dimming event had begun, the largest (of four) of the year, producing as much as a 3% dimming in star brightness.
- 23 May
  - Researchers in Harvard University report that eating up to six bars of chocolate a week could decrease the risk of a potentially fatal heart condition by approximately one quarter.
  - Scientists propose a new type of astronomical object called a "synestia" – a huge, spinning, donut-shaped mass of hot, vaporised rock, formed as planet-sized objects smash into each other.

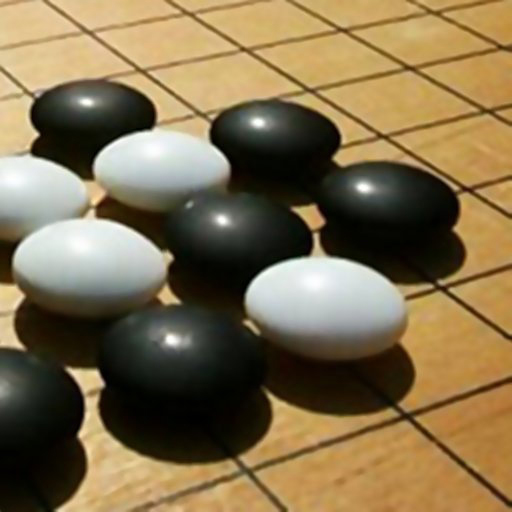
27 May: AI beats the human world champion at the game Go.

- 24 May
  - The launch date of NASA's Psyche probe is brought forward, to target a more efficient trajectory, launching in 2022 and arriving in 2026 with a Mars gravity assist in 2023.
  - Researchers in Switzerland create artificial viruses that can be used to target cancer. These designer viruses alert the immune system and cause it to send killer cells to help fight the tumor. The results, published in Nature Communications, provide a basis for innovative cancer treatments.
- 25 May – An article in Science magazine claims the US Nuclear Regulatory Commission relied on faulty analysis to justify its refusal to adopt a critical measure for protecting Americans from nuclear-waste fires at dozens of reactor sites around the country. Radioactivity from such a fire could force approximately 8 million people to relocate and result in $2 trillion in damages.
- 26 May – Construction begins on the European Extremely Large Telescope.
- 27 May – At the Future of Go Summit in China, Google's DeepMind AlphaGo AI program beats the world's number one Go player, Ke Jie, in the third of three matches.
- 30 May
  - Researchers at the Scripps Research Institute announce a way to structurally modify vancomycin to make the antibiotic more powerful.
  - A survey of 352 experts in artificial intelligence finds that experts believe there is a 50% chance of AI outperforming humans in all tasks within 45 years and of automating all human jobs in 120 years.
- 31 May – Muon g-2, a precision experiment to measure the g-factor of muons, starts taking data.

=== June ===
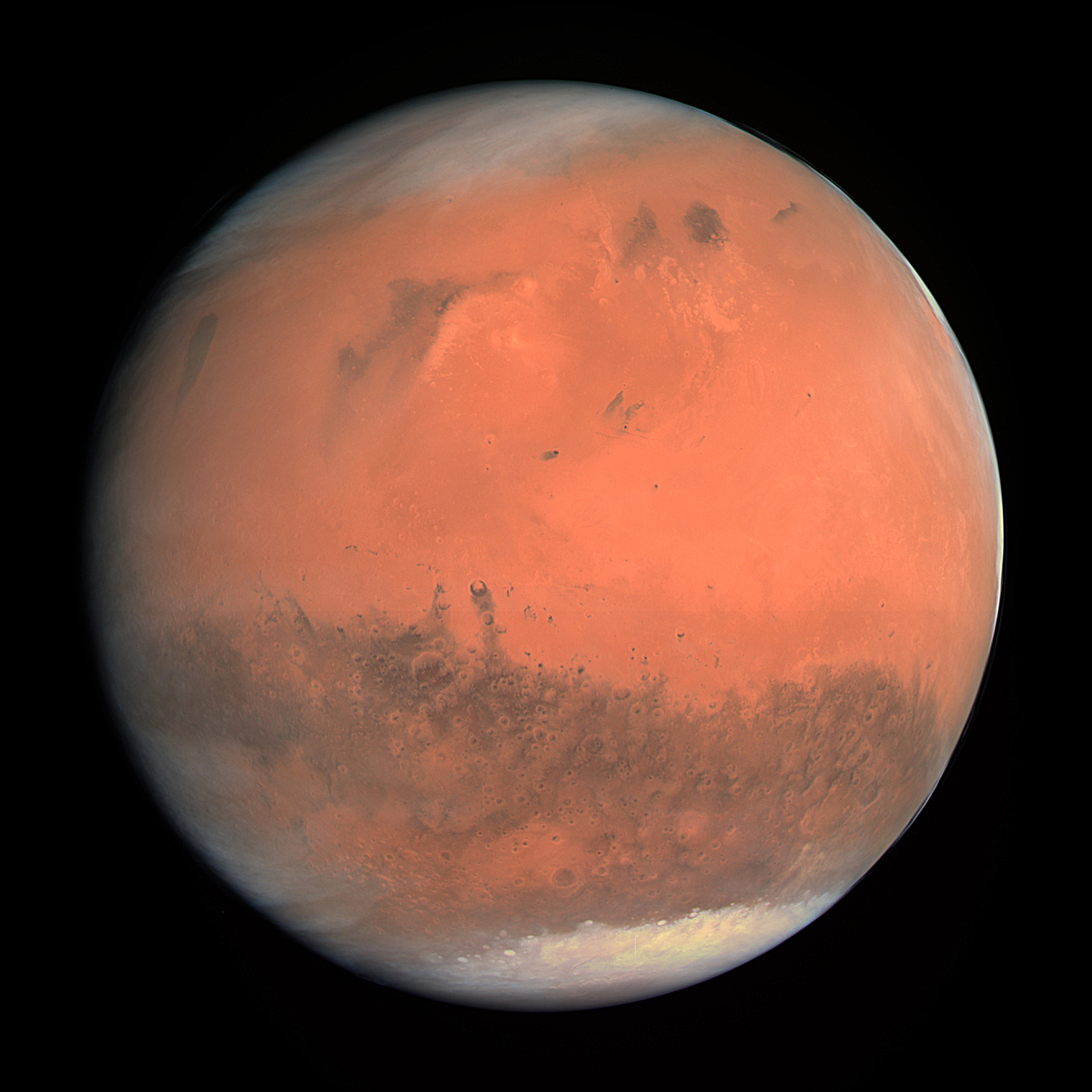
1 June: Elon Musk publishes a paper on the future human settlement of Mars.

- 1 June
  - SpaceX founder and CEO Elon Musk publishes Making Humans a Multi-Planetary Species, his plans for the future colonisation of Mars.
  - Astronomers report the detection of a third gravitational wave, named GW170104, thereby further supporting the theory of general relativity presented in 1916 by Albert Einstein.
  - NASA reports that the Curiosity rover provided evidence of an ancient lake in Gale crater on Mars that could have been favorable for microbial life; the ancient lake was stratified, with shallows rich in oxidants and depths poor in oxidants; and, the ancient lake provided many different types of microbe-friendly environments at the same time. NASA further reports that the Curiosity rover will continue to explore higher and younger layers of Mount Sharp in order to determine how the lake environment in ancient times on Mars became the drier environment in more modern times.
- 5 June – Astronomers at The Ohio State University and Vanderbilt University have detected a planet that is so hot, its heat rivals most stars. With a day-side temperature of 4,600 Kelvin (more than 7,800 degrees Fahrenheit), planet KELT-9b is hotter than most stars, and only 1,200 Kelvin (about 2,000 degrees Fahrenheit) cooler than our own sun.
- 7 June – Scientists report evidence, based on fossil remains found in the western part of North Africa in Morocco at Jebel Irhoud, that Homo sapiens may have originated about 300,000 years ago, over 100,000 years earlier than previously thought.
- 9 June – Researchers at the University of Zurich report the creation of the largest virtual universe ever simulated, consisting of 25 billion galaxies generated from 2 trillion digital particles.
- 12 June
  - Researchers at Vrije Universiteit Amsterdam identify seven risk genes for insomnia.
  - Two new moons – S/2016 J1 and S/2017 J1 – are reported to be orbiting Jupiter, bringing the gas giant's total number of known natural satellites to 69.

7 June: Evidence suggests that Homo sapiens may have originated 300,000 years ago, much earlier than the 200,000 years ago thought previously.

- 15 June
  - Chinese scientists report the successful transmission of entangled photons between suborbital space and Earth, using the satellite Micius.
  - A study by the universities of Coventry and Radboud finds that meditation, yoga and Tai Chi can 'reverse' the molecular reactions in DNA which cause ill-health and depression.
- 18 June – The European Society of Cardiology reports a vaccine that lowers cholesterol in mice, which may offer hope of immunising against cardiovascular disease.
- 19 June – Astronomers report evidence of a possible tenth Mars-sized planet residing at the edge of the Solar System.
- 20 June
  - NASA's Kepler Space Telescope team publish 219 new exoplanet candidates, 10 of which are near-Earth size and orbiting in their star's habitable zone.
  - The European Space Agency confirms the Laser Interferometer Space Antenna (LISA) as the third large-class mission in its science programme, with launch expected in 2034.
- 22 June – A study of snail neurons, published in Current Biology, suggests memories that trigger anxiety and PTSD could be 'erased' without affecting normal memory of past events.
- 26 June
  - Research by Cornell University suggests that rising sea levels will displace 1.4 billion people by 2060 and 2 billion by 2100.
  - Remote Sensing Systems (RSS), a satellite record of lower tropospheric temperature, undergoes a major revision, showing nearly 30% faster warming since 1979.
- 29 June – A study published in the journal Science concludes that unmitigated climate change will exacerbate inequality in the USA, with southern states losing up to 20 percent of their income by century's end.
- 30 June – The Japan Aerospace Exploration Agency (JAXA) reveals plans to send an astronaut to the Moon by 2030.

=== July ===
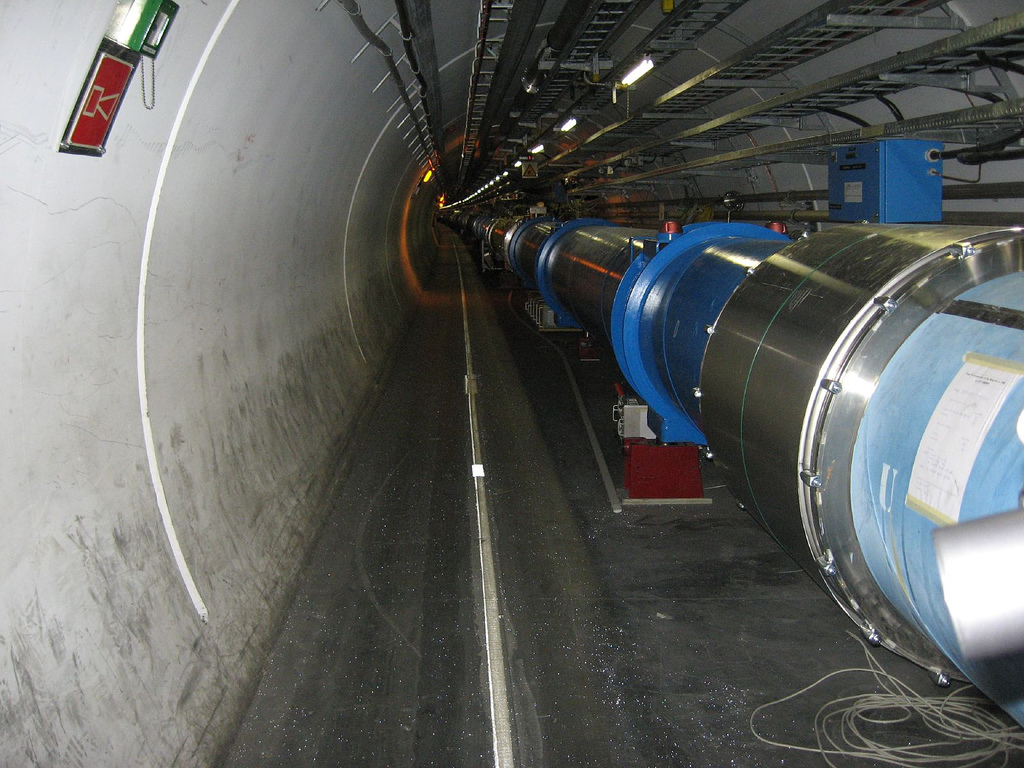
6 July: New baryon particle confirmed by scientists at the Large Hadron Collider.

- 1 July – Researchers from the University of Alabama at Birmingham warn that brainwave-sensing headsets are vulnerable to hacking and could reveal a user's passwords if their brainwaves are being monitored.
- 4 July – Scientists report evidence that homo sapiens may have migrated out of Africa 270,000 years ago, much earlier than the 70,000 years ago thought previously.
- 5 July – A study in the journal Science Advances shows that climate sensitivity is greater than previously thought, and that lower estimates of future temperatures do not take into account long-term patterns of warming.
- 6 July
  - Physicists at CERN's Large Hadron Collider report the detection of the particle Ξ^{++}_{cc} (with the Greek letter Xi), a new hadron, a composite particle containing two charm quarks and one up quark.
  - Researchers report that the surface on the planet Mars may be more toxic to microorganisms, especially a common terrestrial type, Bacillus subtilis, than thought earlier. This is based on studies with perchlorates, common on Mars, in a simulated Martian ultraviolet atmosphere.
- 7 July – Researchers at Queensland University of Technology announce the development of a genetically modified banana with higher levels of vitamin A, which could improve the nutritional content of bananas in Uganda.
- 10 July
  - NASA's Juno spacecraft obtains close-range images of Jupiter's red spot.
  - Scientists from Stanford University publish evidence that a sixth mass extinction of life on Earth is already underway.
- 11 July – Researchers at George Washington University reveal a new prototype solar cell with 44.5 percent efficiency.

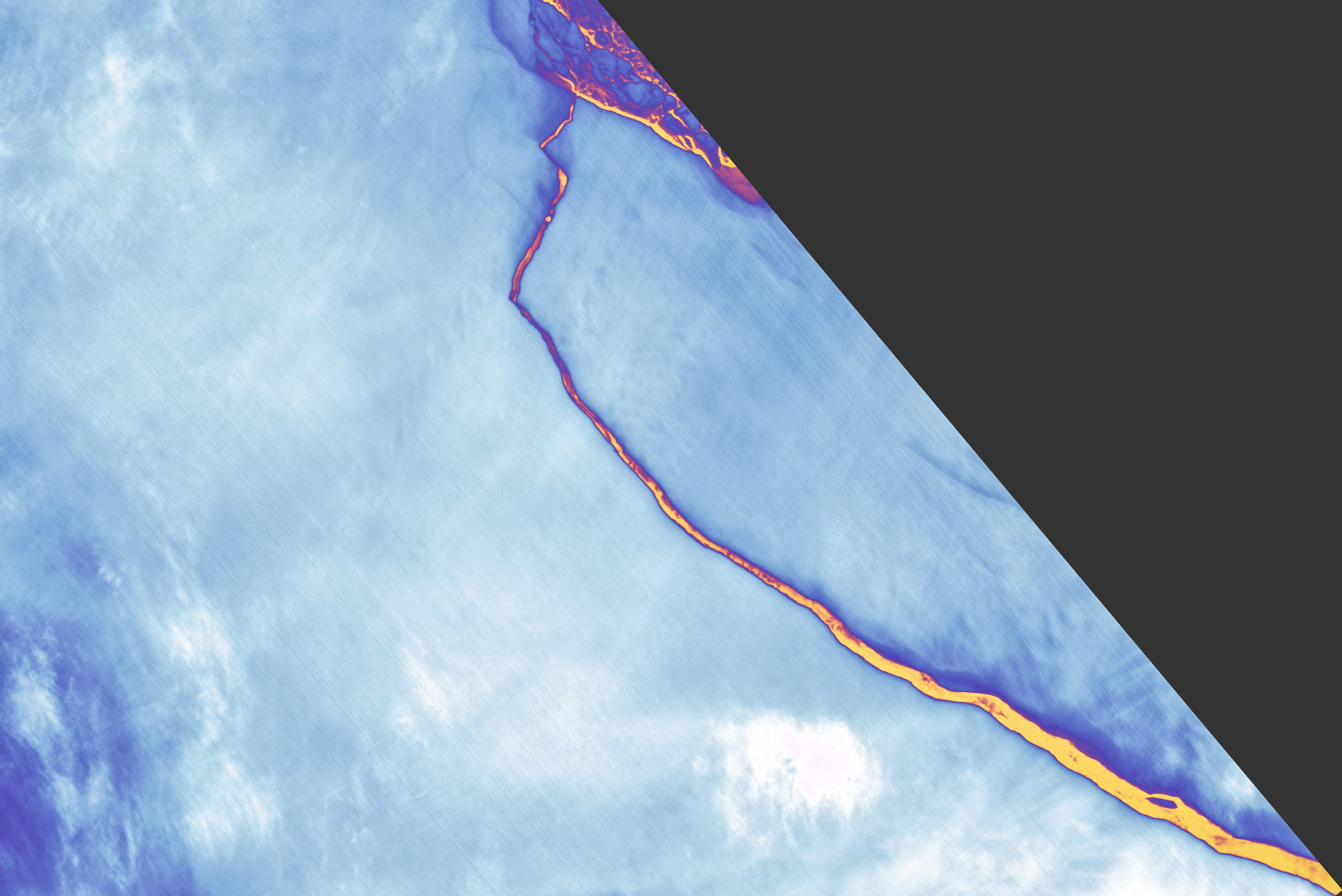
12 July: Iceberg A-68 detaches from Antarctica.

- 12 July
  - A huge iceberg, one of the largest ever recorded, detaches from the Larsen C ice shelf in Antarctica.
  - The discovery of the smallest star able to sustain fusion, EBLM J0555-57Ab, is announced; its diameter is just slightly larger than Saturn.
  - Scientists at Harvard use the CRISPR gene-editing system to store a GIF animation in the DNA of bacteria.
  - Research published in Royal Society Open Science reveals that six of the world's large carnivores – the African wild dog, cheetah, Ethiopian wolf, lion, red wolf and tiger – have lost over 90% of their historic range.
- 14 July – Astrophysicists report that tardigrade micro-animals may be one of the most resilient life forms on Earth since they may be able to withstand global mass extinctions due to astrophysical events, such as supernovae, gamma-ray bursts, large asteroid impacts, and passing-by stars.
- 17 July
  - Astronomers confirm the detection of strange radio signals from Ross 128, a nearby red dwarf star.
  - Researchers at the University of Tokyo demonstrate a breathable nanoscale mesh with an electronic sensor that can be worn on the skin for a week without discomfort, and could potentially monitor a person's health continuously over a long period.
  - Researchers in California report how carbon sequestration in the ocean can be made 500 times faster, by simply adding a common enzyme to the process.
- 18 July – A computer simulation by the University of Manchester suggests that Tyrannosaurus rex moved slower than was thought previously, with its size and weight limiting the dinosaur to a maximum of 20 km/h (12 mph).
- 19 July – Archaeologists publish evidence that Aboriginal people have been in Australia for at least 65,000 years, suggesting the arrival of humans on the continent was up to 18,000 years earlier than previously thought.

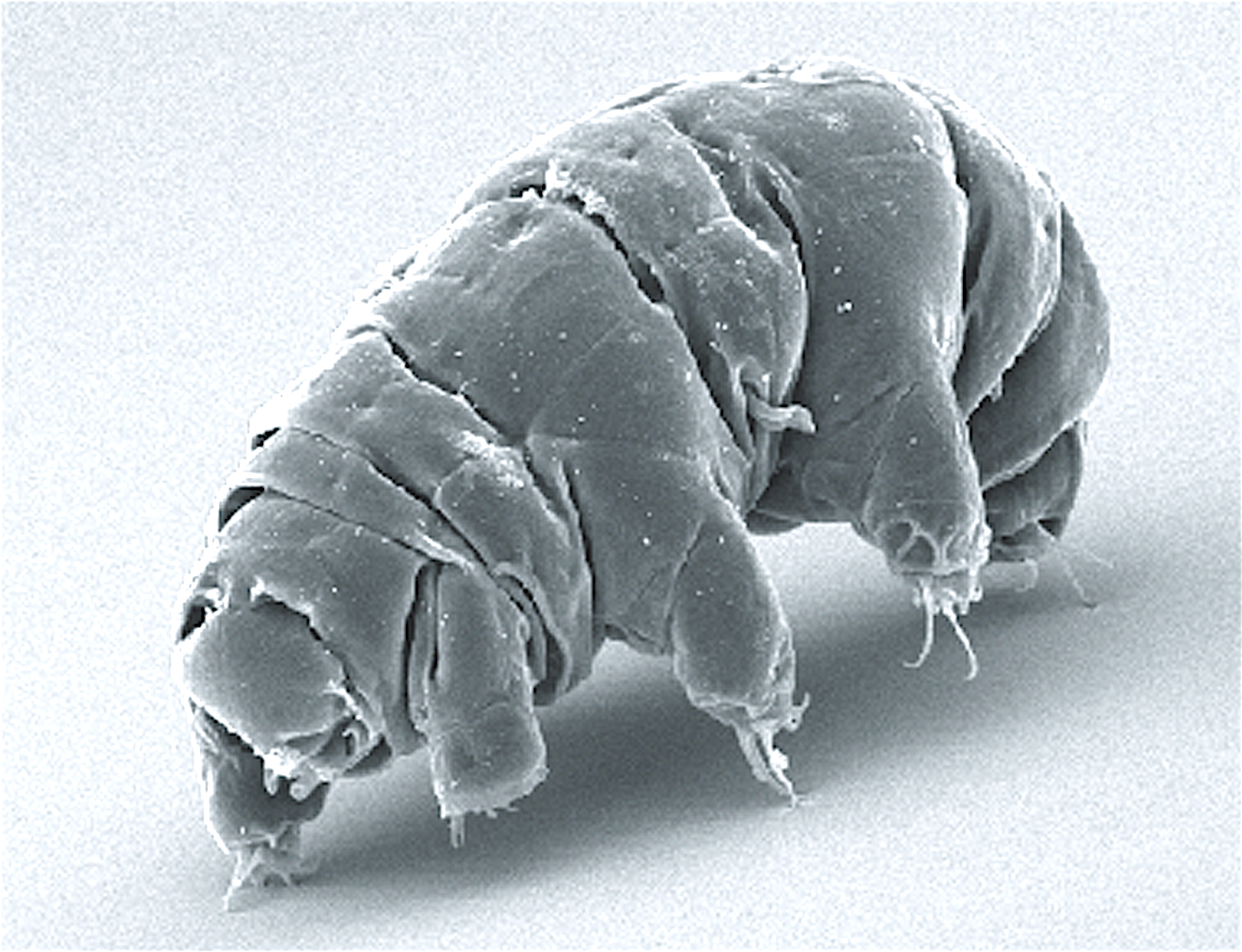
14 July: Tardigrades, one of the most resilient life forms on Earth, may withstand global mass extinctions due to astrophysical events.

- 21 July – Asteroid 2017 OO1 passes close to Earth.
- 25 July – Researchers at Ulsan National Institute of Science and Technology (UNIST) announce a new record efficiency of 22.1% for perovskite solar cells.
- 26 July
  - The Breakthrough Starshot initiative announces that it has developed and launched the world's smallest spacecraft, precursors of "StarChip", known as "Sprites", measuring just 3.5 cm and weighing only four grams, but containing solar panels, computers, sensors, and radios.
  - Researchers discover that stem cells in the brain's hypothalamus govern how fast aging occurs in the body.
  - The first gene editing of human embryos in the USA is reported to have taken place, using CRISPR.
- 27 July
  - Astronomers announce that half the matter of the Milky Way galaxy may have come from other distant galaxies.
  - Astronomers report the first measurement of a gamma ray burst (namely, GRB 160625B) as it happened.
- 28 July – An organic compound, acrylonitrile, or vinyl cyanide, (C_{2}H_{3}CN), possibly essential for life by being related to cell membrane and vesicle structure formation, is reported to have been found on Titan, moon of Saturn.

=== August ===
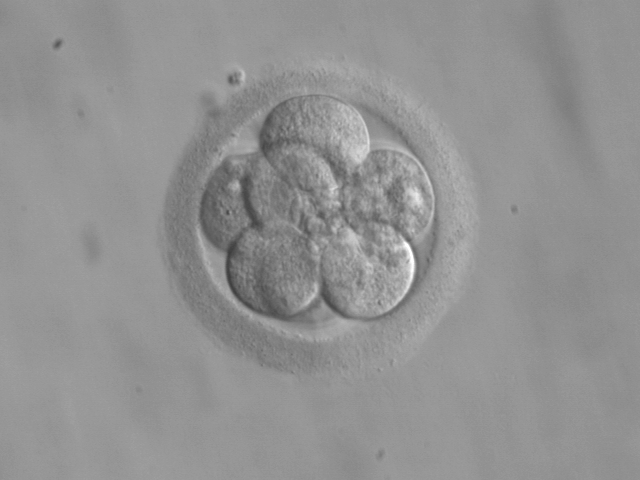
2 August: CRISPR used to remove faulty DNA from human embryos for the first time.

- 1 August
  - Scientists present a detailed description and 3D model image of possibly the first flower that lived about 140 million years ago.
  - Virgo joins LIGO in the measurement of gravitational waves, improving the sensitivity.
- 2 August
  - For the first time, scientists use CRISPR in human embryos to remove faulty DNA responsible for a hereditary heart condition.
  - Scientists at Edinburgh Napier University report a treatment based on antimicrobial peptides that could potentially lead to a cure for the common cold.
  - Astronomers report that WASP-121b is the first exoplanet found to contain water (in the form of hot water molecules) in an extrasolar planetary stratosphere (i.e., an atmospheric layer in which temperatures increase as the altitude increases). WASP-121b is a "hot Jupiter" in the constellation Puppis, and is about 880 light-years (light travel distance) from Earth.
- 4 August – In a letter to Darwin Life, Inc. and New Hope Fertility Center, the FDA warns that the "three parent baby" technique should not be marketed in the U.S.
- 5 August – NASA celebrates the fifth anniversary of the Curiosity rover mission landing, and related exploratory accomplishments, on the planet Mars. (Videos: Curiosity's First Five Years (02:07); Curiosity's POV: Five Years Driving (05:49); Curiosity's Discoveries About Gale Crater (02:54))

8 August: Patagotitan mayorum, one of the largest ever dinosaurs, is officially named.

- 8 August – Patagotitan mayorum, one of the largest ever dinosaurs, is officially named by researchers.
- 10 August – Researchers at Brown University report the transmission of data through a terahertz multiplexer at 50 gigabits per second, which could lead to a new generation of ultra-fast Wi-Fi.
- 11 August – A deep learning algorithm is reported to be capable of visually identifying thousands of plant species.
- 12 August – Scientists discover 91 volcanoes located two kilometres below the West Antarctic Ice Sheet, making it the largest volcanic region on Earth.
- 14 August – A study by Ben-Gurion University suggests that the use of 'smiley' emoticons in workplace emails may reduce the perception of competence, and could even undermine information sharing.
- 21 August
  - Researchers at MIT's Plasma Science and Fusion Center (PSFC) working with colleagues in Belgium and the UK find a new way to generate very high-energetic ions to study nuclear fusion.
  - A team of scientists from all over the globe finds that there may indeed be diamond precipitation deep inside icy giant planets like Neptune and Uranus.
- 22 August
  - Scientists at the American Chemical Society meeting in Washington demonstrate "cyborg bacteria" able to outperform plants at photosynthesis.
  - Engineers in the U.S. demonstrate how to make ultra-compact antennas for wireless communication 100 times smaller than their current size.

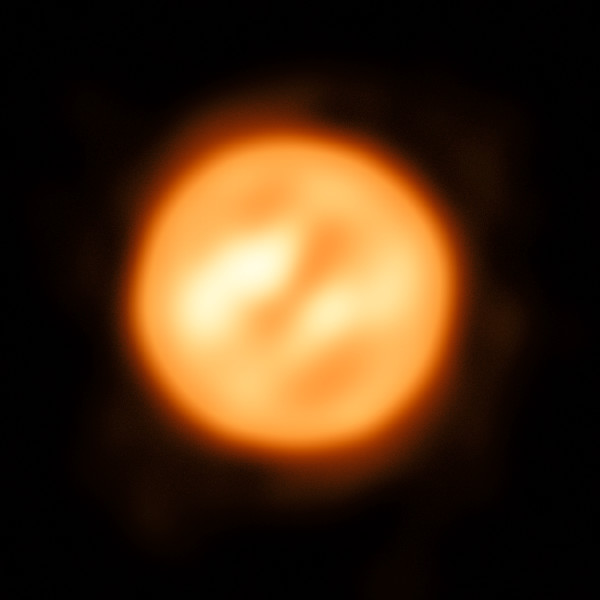
23 August: Antares, most detailed image of a star other than the Sun.

- 23 August
  - A peer-reviewed study by Harvard University concludes that petroleum company Exxon misled the public about the dangers of climate change for nearly 40 years.
  - Astronomers using ESO's Very Large Telescope to study the star Antares produce the most detailed image and create the first map of surface motion of a star other than the Sun.
- 24 August – In a study published by Nature, researchers at the University of Manchester show that magnetic hysteresis is possible in individual molecules at −213 °C. This proves that storing data with single-molecule magnets is more feasible than previously thought, and could theoretically give 100 times higher density than current technologies.
- 26 August – Astronomers detect 15 repeating Fast Radio Bursts coming from FRB 121102 located in a dwarf galaxy about 3 billion light-years away from Earth. The researchers note that FRB 121102 is presently in a "heightened activity state, and follow-on observations are encouraged, particularly at higher radio frequencies".
- 28 August – Scientists break the record for coldest temperature of molecules, at 50 millionths of a degree above absolute zero.
- 31 August – Astronomers at the Hubble Space Telescope report the first hints of possible water content within the TRAPPIST-1 multiplanetary system, which includes seven Earth-sized exoplanets, about 40 light-years away from Earth.

=== September ===
- 1 September – The European X-ray Free Electron Laser (XFEL) is officially opened in the German city of Hamburg.
- 4 September – Astronomers report the discovery of an intermediate-mass black hole with 100,000 solar masses hiding in a gas cloud near the heart of the Milky Way, ranking it as the second largest black hole ever seen in the galaxy.

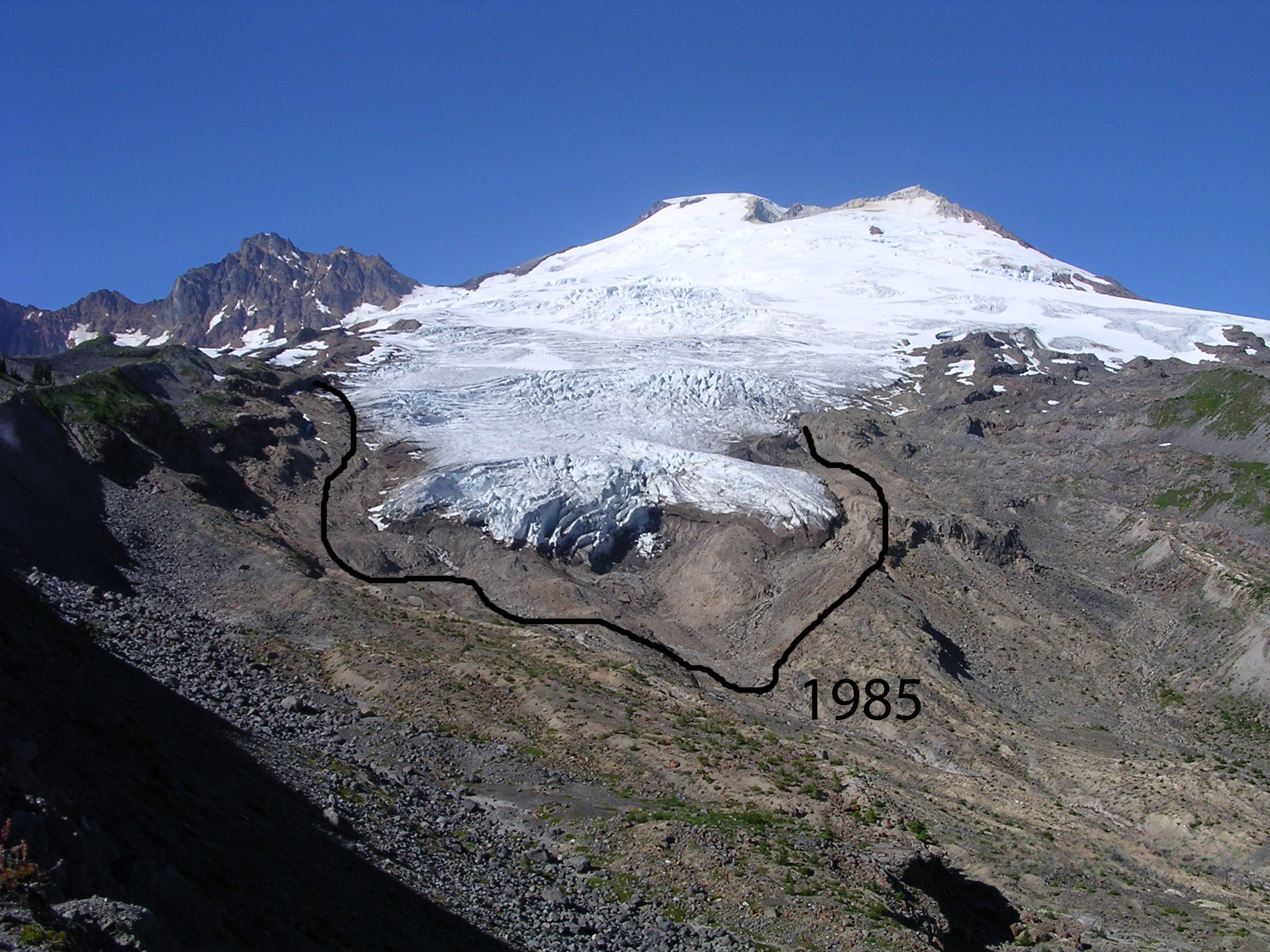
13 September: Third of the mass of Asia's high mountain glaciers may be expected to be lost by 2100 due to global warming.

- 5 September
  - NASA celebrates 40 years of the Voyager missions, which included the launch of Voyager 1 on 5 September 1977, and the earlier launch of Voyager 2 on 20 August 1977, presently traveling into interstellar space, beyond the outer solar system.
  - Scientists report that the Curiosity rover detected boron, an essential ingredient for life on Earth, on the planet Mars. Such a finding, along with previous discoveries that water may have been present on ancient Mars, further supports the possible early habitability of Gale Crater on Mars.
- 6 September – A research team led by Andrea Morello at the University of New South Wales invented a new type of quantum computing design they called Flip-flop qubits, which makes it much easier to integrate quantum computing with electronic circuits compared with existing approaches.
- 7 September – The International Astronomical Union officially approves the naming of 14 features on the surface of Pluto. These are the first geological features on the planet to be named following the close flyby by the New Horizons spacecraft in July 2015.
- 11 September – The second phase of experimentation at the upgraded Wendelstein 7-X fusion reactor begins, and first plasmas are produced.
- 13 September
  - A study published in Nature concludes that Asia's mountain glaciers will lose at least a third of their mass through global warming by 2100.
  - A quantum computer at IBM was used to calculate energy levels in beryllium hydride. The calculation method is an important step towards the simulation of larger molecules beyond the reach of classical supercomputers.

15 September: End of Cassini-Huygens's 20-year mission to explore the planet Saturn.

- 15 September – The Cassini-Huygens spacecraft ends its 20-year mission to explore the planet Saturn, its rings and moons. The spacecraft is directed into Saturn's atmosphere to disintegrate.
- 25 September
  - A 35-year-old man who had been in a vegetative state for 15 years after a car accident is reported to have shown signs of consciousness after neurosurgeons implanted a vagus nerve stimulator into his chest.
  - The Australian government announces that it will establish a national space agency.
- 27 September
  - The LIGO and Virgo collaborations announce the detection of a fourth binary black hole merger, GW170814. For the first time, three detectors recorded the signal, leading to a more precise localization of the source in the sky.
  - Researchers from Oxford, Münster and Exeter Universities create photonic computer chips – that use light rather than electricity – to imitate the way a brain's synapses operate.
- 28 September – The last recovered image taken by the Rosetta spacecraft, which closely studied the comet 67P/Churyumov–Gerasimenko (67P), and which later impacted the surface of the comet, is reported.
- 29 September – At the 68th International Astronautical Congress in Adelaide, Australia, Elon Musk reveals the next plans for his company SpaceX including the announcement of a rocket called Big Falcon Rocket, known as Starship as of 2019.
- 30 September – NASA reports radiation levels on the surface of the planet Mars were temporarily doubled, and were associated with an aurora 25-times brighter than any observed earlier, due to a massive, and unexpected, solar storm in mid-September 2017.

=== October ===
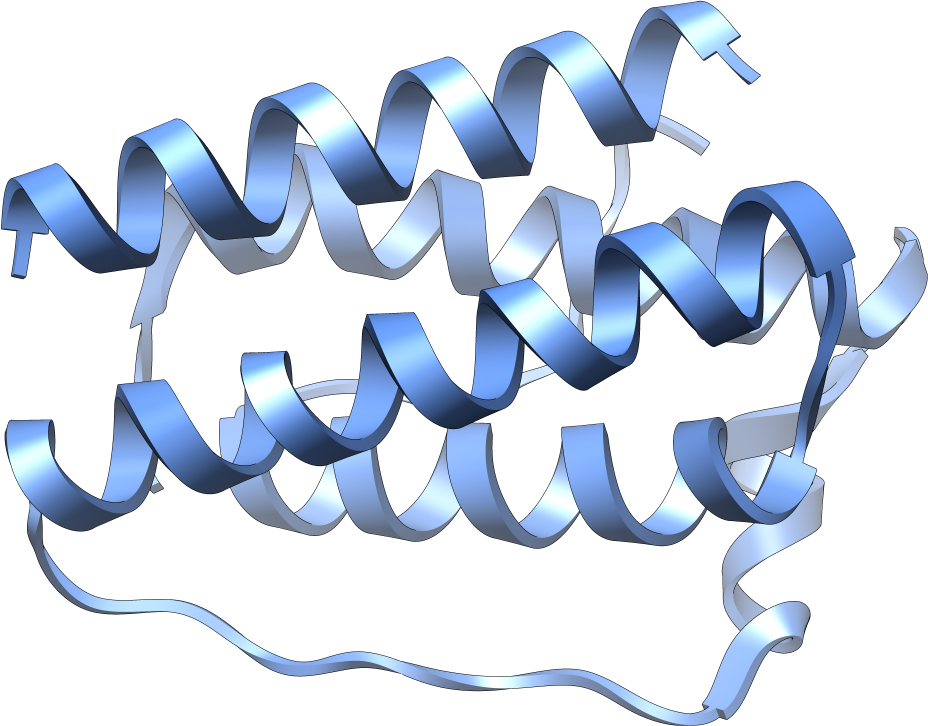
10 October: A tenfold increase in childhood and adolescent obesity since 1975 is reported (leptin molecule pictured).

- 2 October
  - The Nobel Prize in Physiology or Medicine is awarded to Jeffrey C. Hall, Michael Rosbash and Michael W. Young for their discoveries of molecular mechanisms controlling the circadian rhythm.
- 3 October
  - The Nobel Prize in Physics is awarded to Rainer Weiss, Kip Thorne and Barry Barish for their role in the detection of gravitational waves.
- 4 October
  - The Nobel Prize in Chemistry is awarded to Jacques Dubochet, Joachim Frank and Richard Henderson for "developing cryo-electron microscopy for the high-resolution structure determination of biomolecules in solution".
  - NASA announces that the likely explanation for the unusual dimming events related to KIC 8462852 (or Tabby's Star) is that an "uneven ring of dust" orbits the star.
- 5 October – Astronomers identify C/2017 K2, the most distant comet ever observed in our Solar System, at a distance of 1.5 billion km (0.93 billion mi).
- 9 October
  - A study by the Carnegie Institution for Science finds that wind farms in the North Atlantic could, in theory, provide sufficient energy to meet all of humanity's current needs during wintertime.
  - Scientists at Rutgers University find an efficient way to enhance the nutritional value of corn, by inserting a bacterial gene from E. coli, that stimulates production of a key nutrient called methionine, an amino acid found usually in meat.

16 October: Gravitational wave (GW170817) detected from merger of two neutron stars.

- 10 October – A study by Imperial College London and the World Health Organization finds there has been a tenfold increase in childhood and adolescent obesity since 1975, with the number of obese likely to exceed the underweight by 2022.
- 12 October – The dwarf planet Haumea is confirmed to have a ring system, the first time such a feature has been discovered around a trans-Neptunian object.
- 16 October – Astronomers officially announce the detection of a gravitational wave, named GW170817, associated with the merger of two neutron stars. GW170817 also seemed related to a gamma ray burst, likely GRB 170817A, 1.7 seconds later, and a visible light observational event 11 hours afterwards, AT 2017gfo.
- 17 October – Qualcomm announces the first 5G mobile connection, which has a connection speed of 1 Gbit/s.
- 18 October
  - Alphabet announces an improved version of the AlphaGo artificial intelligence, developed by its subsidiary Google DeepMind.
  - A German study finds a 75% reduction in flying insect biomass over the past 25 years, suggesting the possibility of large-scale ecological collapse.
  - Scientists announce the discovery of teeth fossils in Germany resembling those of Australopithecus afarensis, suggesting the extinct hominin may have existed 9.7 million years ago, much earlier than 3.9 million years ago, and not living only in Africa, as thought previously.

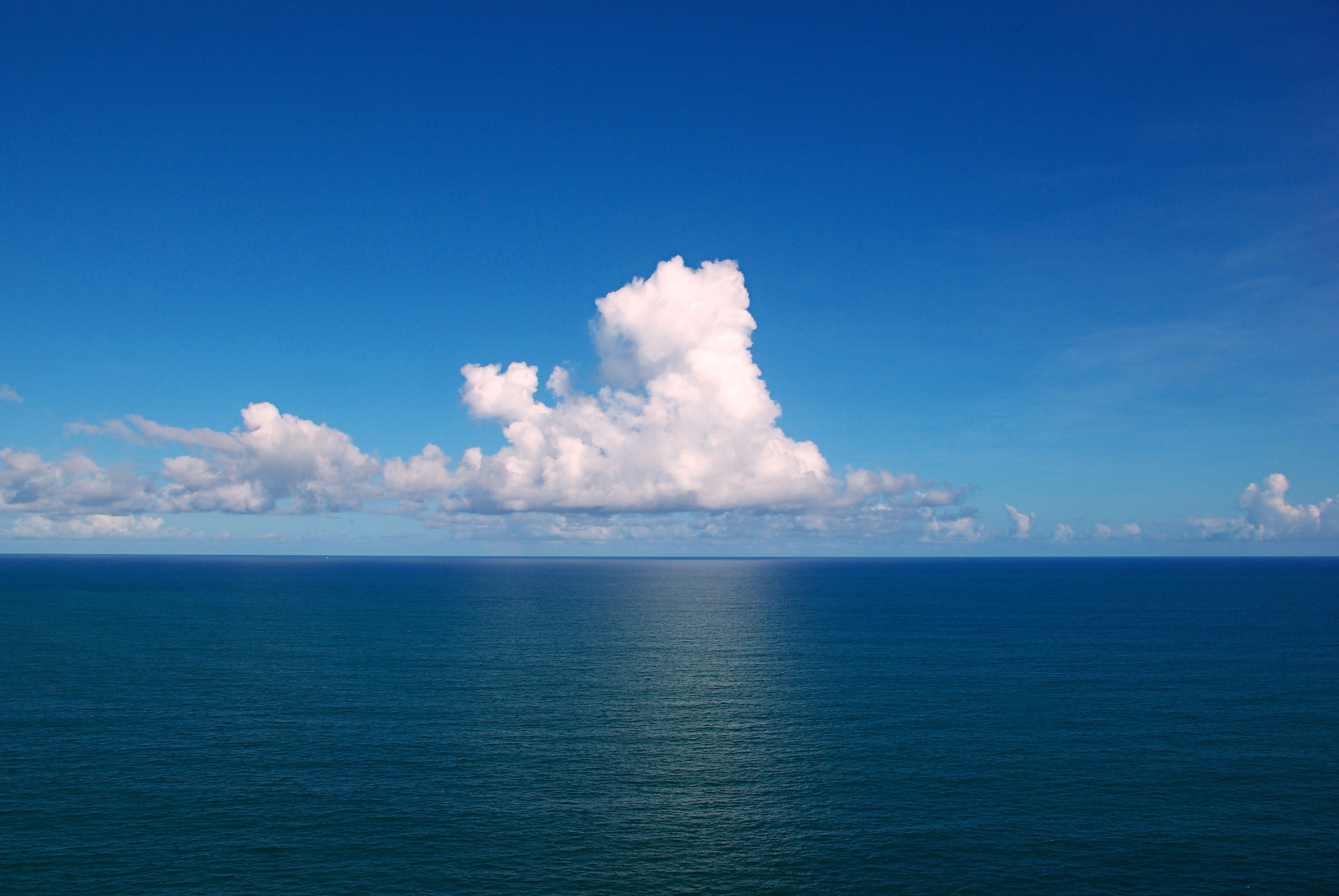
26 October: Ocean temperatures could be warmer now than those in the last 100 million years.

- 19 October
  - Canadian astronomer Robert Weryk discovers ʻOumuamua, the first known interstellar object detected passing through the Solar System.
  - NASA announces that the Dawn spacecraft mission around the dwarf planet Ceres would be extended until the hydrazine fuel in the spacecraft runs out, possibly in the second half of 2018; afterwards, the spacecraft is expected to remain in a stable orbit around Ceres indefinitely.
  - Measurement of the magnetic moment of antiprotons provides further evidence for CPT symmetry, the hypothesis that matter and antimatter behave identical when time and space are reversed at the same time.
- 20 October – IBM shifts the goal for quantum supremacy by demonstrating that classical computers can simulate larger quantum systems than previously thought, and uses a supercomputer to simulate up to 56 qubits.
- 25 October
  - An improved version of the genetic engineering technique CRISPR is published in the journals Science and Nature.
  - In a report, the United States Bureau of Labor Statistics estimates the loss of tens of thousands of US manufacturing jobs, due to the effects of artificial intelligence by 2026, but at the same time estimates growth in fields like software engineering.
- 26 October
  - European researchers discover a flaw in the way ocean temperatures have been estimated, suggesting they were colder in the past than previously thought, and that the current period of warming is unparalleled over the last 100 million years.
  - A study by the University of Melbourne finds that sea levels could rise 1.3m globally unless coal power ends by 2050.
  - NASA reports an object, named A/2017 U1, that is believed to be the first known interstellar asteroid or comet to pass through our Solar System.

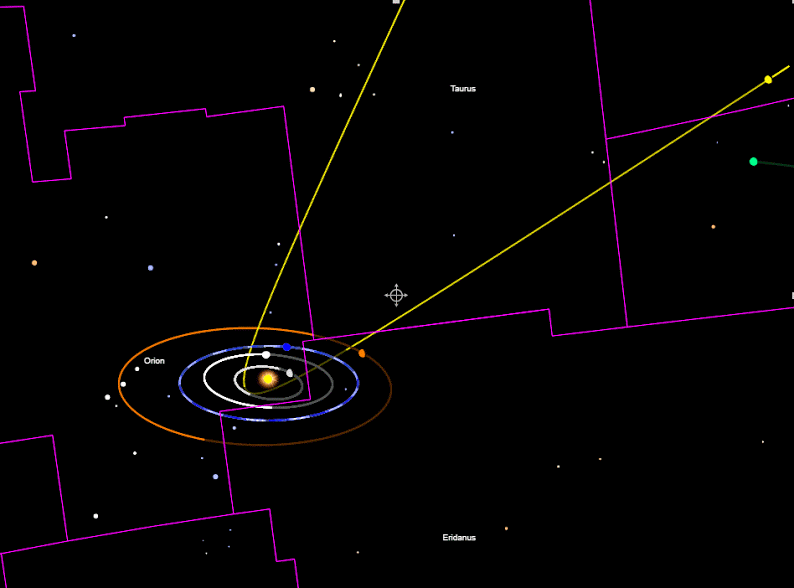
26 October: First known interstellar object to pass through our Solar System

- 30 October – The World Meteorological Organisation (WMO) reports that concentrations of CO_{2} in the Earth's atmosphere reached a record high of 403.3 parts per million in 2016.
- 31 October
  - Researchers at the United States Department of Energy set a new world efficiency record for quantum dot solar cells, at 13.4 percent.
  - Astronomers working with the Next-Generation Transit Survey report the discovery of NGTS-1b, a large confirmed hot Jupiter-sized extrasolar planet orbiting NGTS-1, a small red dwarf star about half the mass and radius of the Sun, every 2.65 days. Daniel Bayliss, of the University of Warwick, and lead author of the study describing the discovery of NGTS-1b, stated, "The discovery of NGTS-1b was a complete surprise to us—such massive planets were not thought to exist around such small stars – importantly, our challenge now is to find out how common these types of planets are in the Galaxy, and with the new Next-Generation Transit Survey facility we are well-placed to do just that."

=== November ===
- 1 November – NASA reports that the first evidence of an exoplanet was noted as early as 1917. The evidence was found after reviewing archival materials discovered in storerooms at the Carnegie Observatories in Pasadena, California.

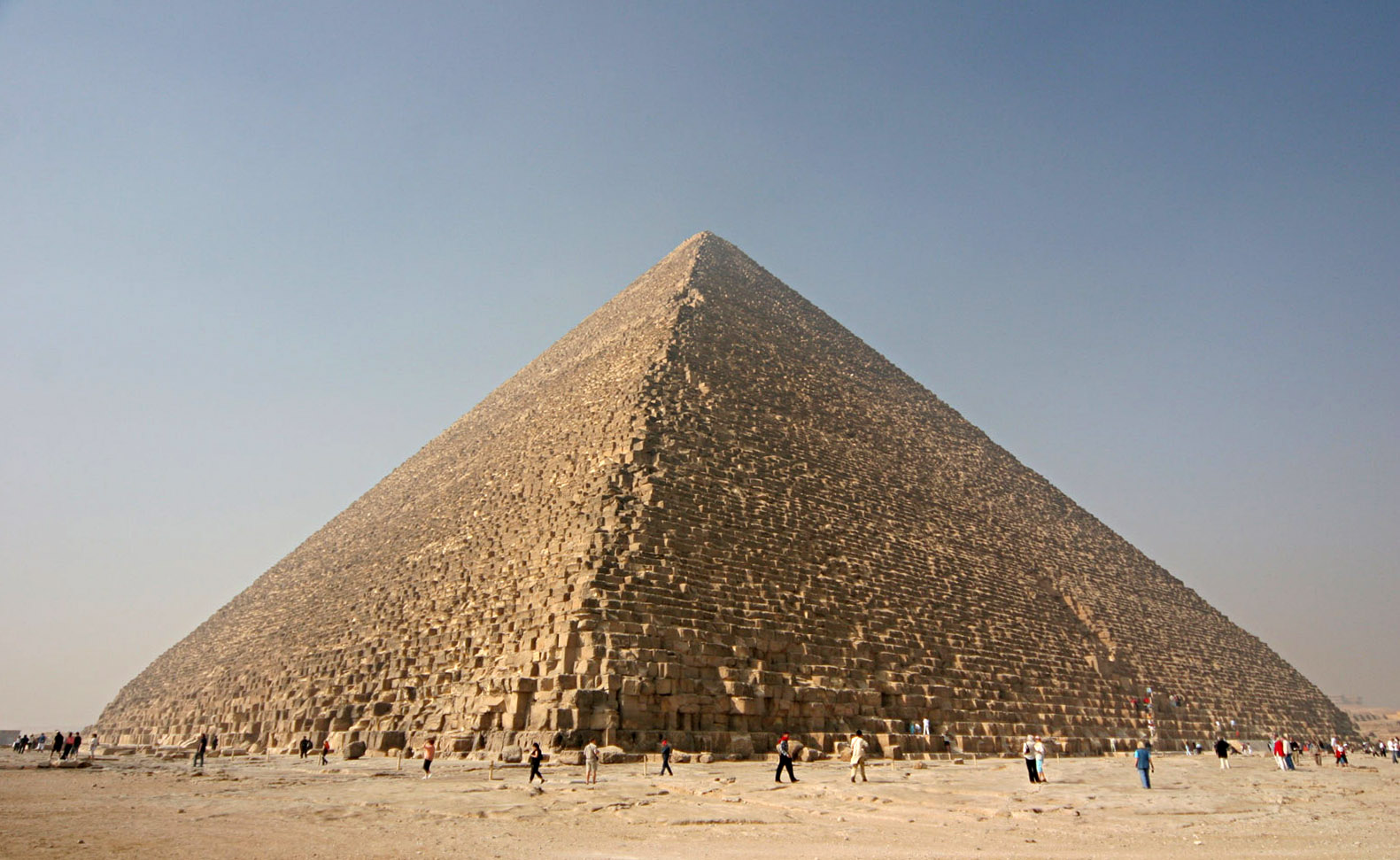
2 November: Large "void" discovered inside the Great Pyramid of Giza.

- 2 November
  - Scientists report that significant changes in the position and structure of the brain have been found in astronauts who have taken trips in space, based on MRI studies. Astronauts who took longer space trips were associated with greater brain changes.
  - Archaeologists using muography report the discovery of a large "void" inside the Great Pyramid of Giza, Egypt.
  - The Tapanuli orangutan (Pongo tapanuliensis), a new species of orangutan, is described in the journal Current Biology.
  - Researchers at the University of Rochester Medical Center identify four genes – KRAS, CDKN2A, SMAD4, and TP53 – responsible for how long patients survive with pancreatic cancer.
  - Researchers from the University of Aberdeen report that a single dose of the drug Trodusquemine can "melt away" fat inside arteries.
- 6 November – A study by the Earth Institute at Columbia University finds that swapping where crops are grown around the world could potentially feed an extra 825 million people.
- 7 November
  - Fossils of tiny shrew-like creatures are discovered in southern England, dating back 145 million years, making them the oldest-known ancestors of most living mammals.
  - UK scientists report that resveratrol analogues, when applied to senescent cells in the laboratory, made the cells look and behave younger, with longer telomeres and the ability to divide again.

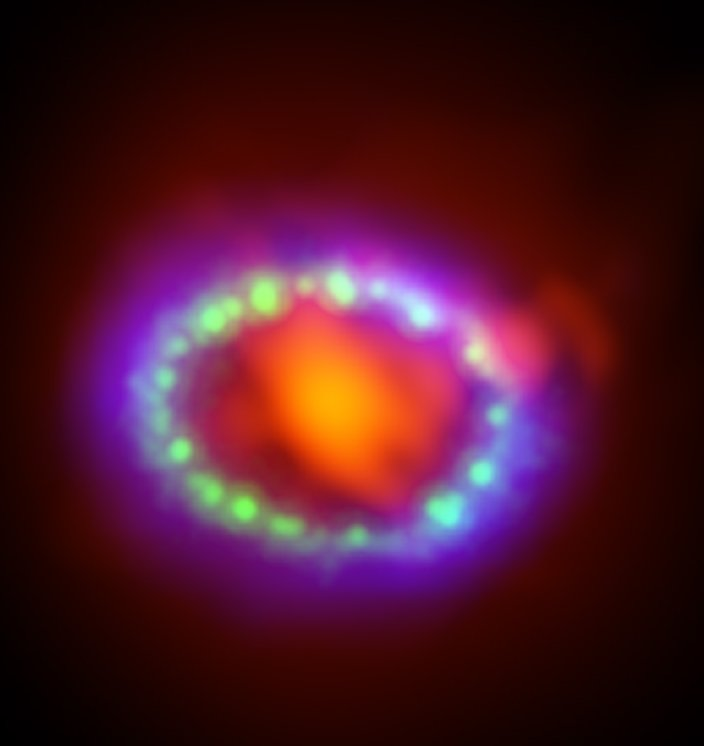
8 November: First known star, IPTF14hls, to have exploded multiple times, over at least 50 years. (example of a supernova remnant shown)

- 8 November
  - Astronomers report the first known case of a star, IPTF14hls, that exploded multiple times, over a period of at least 50 years.
  - Through the use of a gene therapy technique, doctors in Germany are able to treat a boy with junctional epidermolysis bullosa, a disease which leaves skin fragile and easily susceptible to blister formation.
- 9 November – Scientists from the Portuguese Institute of the Sea and the Atmosphere discover and recover the fossil remains of an ancient shark dating back nearly 80 million years, in waters off the coast of the town of Portimão.
- 10 November
  - IBM reports building a quantum computer with 50 qubits.
  - Researchers at Texas A&M University and the Los Alamos National Laboratory discover a new type of material, which is possibly more resistant to the effects of helium in a nuclear fusion reaction than current materials.
- 13 November
  - Global carbon emissions are reported to be rising again after a three-year plateau.
  - Experiments on mice show that variants in a gene called ankyrin-B, carried by millions of Americans, could cause cells to store fat, potentially leading to obesity.
  - The FDA approves "Abilify MyCite", the first drug in the U.S. with a digital ingestion tracking system that records when the medication was taken, via a sensor embedded in the pill.
  - California Institute of Technology researchers manage to stabilize a ring of plasma in open air for the first time.
- 15 November – A study led by Newcastle University finds that sea life in some of the deepest parts of the Pacific Ocean – as far down as 11 km (7 miles) – is contaminated with plastic pollution.
- 20 November – A study by the University of Edinburgh suggests that life on Earth may have originated from biological particles carried by streams of space dust.

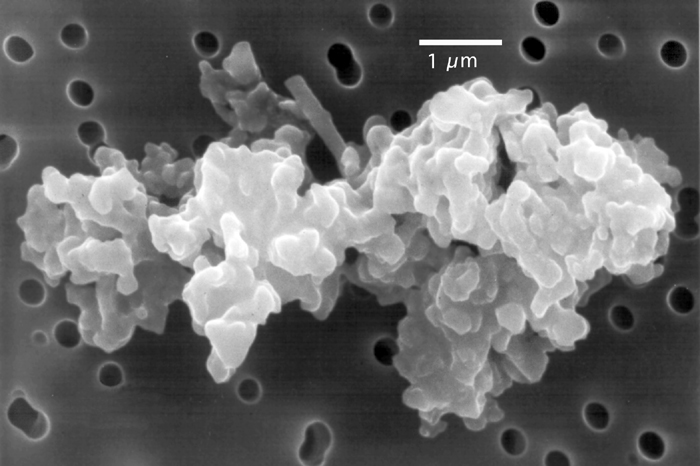
20 November: Studies suggest life on Earth may have originated from biological particles carried by space dust.

- 22 November – In a breakthrough for antibiotic resistance, researchers at the Université de Montréal in Canada report a way of designing better molecules that make it harder for plasmids to move between bacteria.
- 23 November – A study by the University of Leeds finds that shrinking glacier cover across Iceland could lead to increased volcanism in the region, by reducing pressure on the Earth's surface.
- 28 November
  - A study by Northwell Health identifies dozens of new genetic variations associated with a person's general cognitive ability, while also noting a genetic overlap with longevity.
  - Facebook begins to use artificial intelligence to help identify users potentially at risk for suicide, and thus possibly better help provide them the proper mental health and support resources.
  - The Voyager I spacecraft, the most distant man-made object, fires its trajectory thrusters for the first time since 1980, to extend its lifetime by two or three more years.
- 29 November – A study published in Nature finds that inhibiting RNA polymerase III (Pol III), a common enzyme found in all mammals, including humans, can extend the lifespan of flies and worms.
- 30 November – Researchers from Imperial College London announce a breakthrough in optical computing, with a 10,000-fold reduction in the distance over which light can interact.

=== December ===
- 1 December
  - Researchers at the Swiss Federal Institute of Technology Zurich demonstrate a 3D printer using living matter, which could offer unique properties not found in "dead matter" such as plastics or metals.
  - Researchers at the University of Minnesota develop graphene nano 'tweezers' able to grab individual biomolecules, with potential for use in handheld disease diagnostic systems that could be run on smartphones.

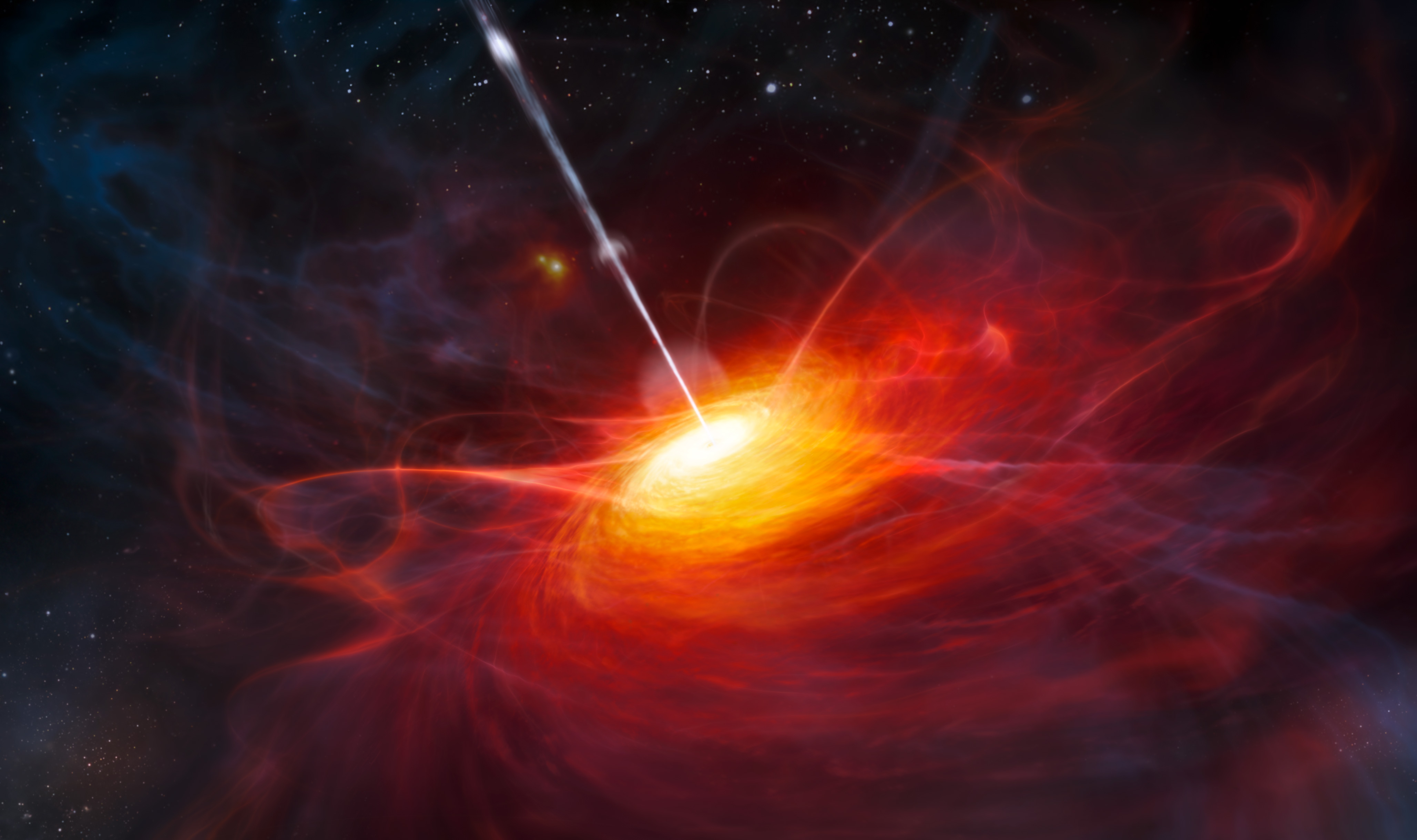
6 December: Most distant quasar, ULAS J1342+0928, and supermassive black hole found so far. (artist concept of similar quasar)

  - Scientists establish a new method to estimate the magnitude of large earthquakes in minutes instead of hours based on measurements of the gravitational field in the region.
- 4 December – The MICROSCOPE (satellite) collaboration publishes its first results. The Equivalence principle was measured to hold true within a precision of 10^{−15}, improving prior measurements by an order of magnitude.
- 5 December – Google's new AlphaZero AI beats a champion chess program after teaching itself in four hours.
- 6 December
  - Astronomers report detecting the most distant known quasar ULAS J1342+0928, which contains the most distant supermassive black hole, at a reported redshift of z = 7.54, surpassing the redshift of 7 for the previously known most distant quasar ULAS J1120+0641.
  - Construction of the ITER nuclear fusion project reaches the halfway point.
  - Scientists at Harvard University's Wyss Institute for Biologically Inspired Engineering announce a 100-fold increase in the complexity of "DNA bricks" that can self-assemble into 3D nanostructures.
  - A paper by the Carnegie Institution for Science concludes that climate models with the most severe impacts for later this century are likely to be the most accurate, suggesting that the IPCC reports may be underestimating the future trends.
- 7 December
  - Physicists at the University of Illinois at Urbana–Champaign report the discovery of a new form of matter called excitonium.
  - Massachusetts Institute of Technology researchers discover a method to make bacteria more vulnerable to a type of antibiotics known as quinolones.
- 8 December – Scientists report that Homo sapiens may have migrated out of Africa as early as 120,000 years ago, particularly into Asia; well before the traditional exiting date of 60,000 years ago.

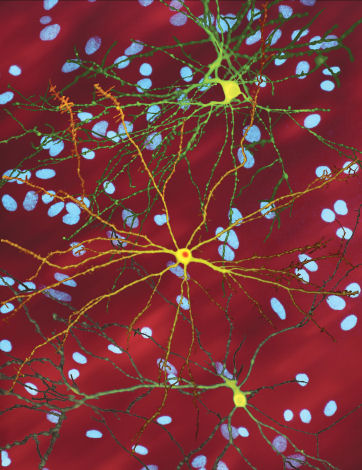
11 December: Genetic error corrected for Huntington's disease using IONIS-HTTRx, an experimental drug.

- 9 December – Astronomers report a brightening of X-ray emissions from GW170817 (gravitational wave)/GRB 170817A (gamma-ray burst)/SSS17a (optical astronomical transient).
- 11 December
  - University College London reports that a genetic error responsible for Huntington's disease has been corrected in patients for the first time, using an experimental drug called IONIS-HTTRx.
  - Vanderbilt University researchers develop a new hyperlens material, which makes it possible to resolve details as small as a virus on the surface of living cells.
  - University of Waterloo researchers devise a new battery technology innovation which could lead car batteries to be able to hold dramatically more energy, thus leading to an extended travel range per charge in electric vehicles.
- 13 December
  - Engineers at Columbia University manage to create artificial graphene in a nano-fabricated semiconductor structure.
  - The firm Carbon Engineering demonstrates the synthesization of gasoline and diesel fuels with the use of carbon dioxide captured from the air and hydrogen derived from water, with its "Air to Fuels" technology for the first time.
- 14 December
  - British doctors use a new form of gene therapy to treat haemophilia A, a genetic defect which leads to constant bleeding.
  - NASA astronomers report the detection of Kepler-90i, a super-Earth exoplanet, and the eighth in a multiexoplanetary system orbiting the star Kepler-90, which now hosts the most exoplanets ever found to date orbiting an extrasolar star. The exoplanet was found in archival data gathered by the Kepler space telescope with the aid of a newly utilized computer tool, deep learning, a class of machine learning algorithms.
  - Archeological excavations at Lechaio in Greece reveal new evidence of large-scale Ancient Roman engineering.

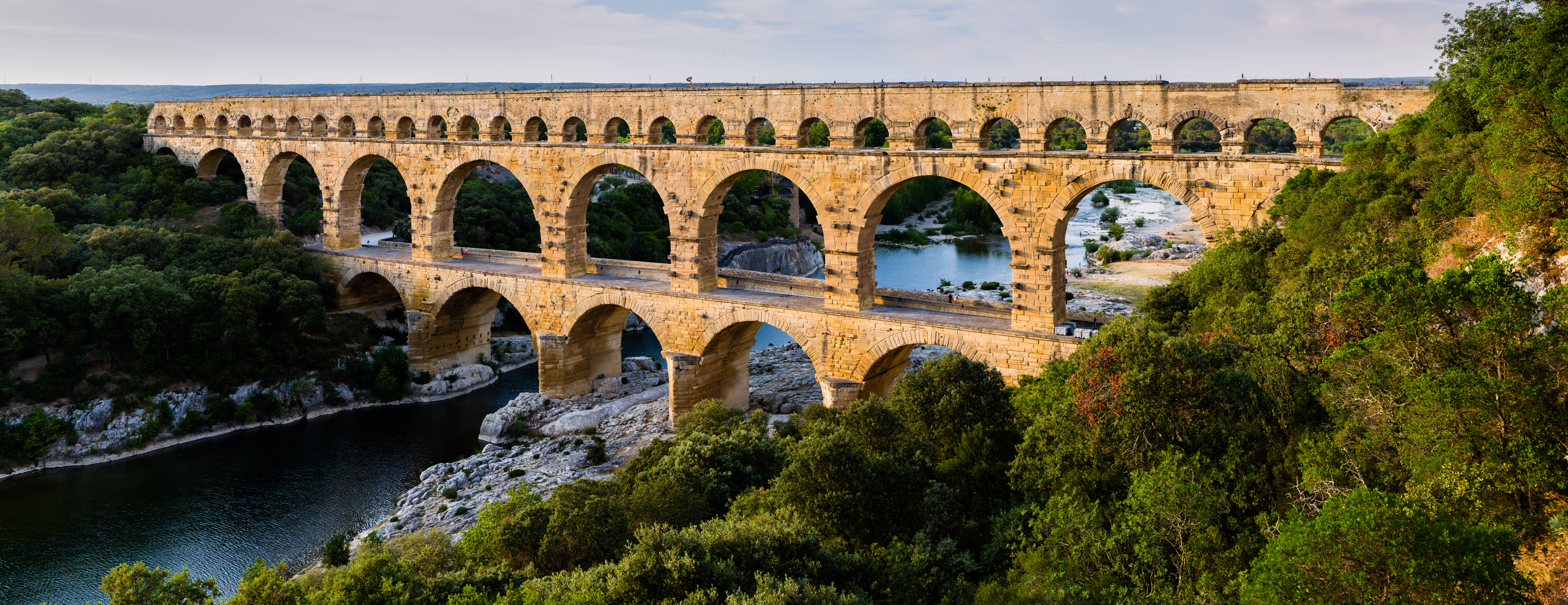
14 December: Studies at Lechaio in Greece reveal evidence of large-scale ancient Roman engineering – an example of such engineering is pictured.

- 15 December
  - Researchers at the University of New South Wales publish a complete design for a quantum computer chip that can be manufactured using mostly standard industry processes and components.
  - Researchers at the United States Department of Energy's Princeton Plasma Physics Laboratory and Princeton University develop a piece of software employing the use of new artificial intelligence techniques which is more efficient at predicting possible disruptions in nuclear fusion reactions.
  - The first baby is born from a transplanted cadaveric womb, in Brazil.
- 16 December – The Pentagon confirms the existence of the Advanced Aviation Threat Identification Program (AATIP), a secret investigatory effort funded from 2007 to 2012 by the United States Government to research and study unidentified flying objects.
- 17 December – The peer-reviewed scientific journal Nano Letters publishes details of a memory storage device only one atomic layer thick.
- 18 December – Scientists report that 3.45 billion year old Australian rocks once contained microorganisms, the earliest direct evidence of life on Earth.
- 19 December – The FDA approves Luxturna, the first gene therapy for an inherited condition in the U.S., for patients with a form of retinal dystrophy.
- 21 December
  - The company General Fusion reports achieving the first plasma on its newest plasma injector named PI3, the world's largest.
  - Astronomers report that RZ Piscium, a star that brightens and dims in a highly erratic manner, is associated with a large amount of infrared radiation, suggestive evidence that a large amount of gas, dust and debris is orbiting the star, possibly as a result of the disruption, or destruction, of local planets by the star.

== Awards ==
- Queen Elizabeth Prize for Engineering – Eric Fossum, George E. Smith, Nobukazu Teranishi and Michael Francis Tompsett

== Deaths ==
- 4 January – Heinz Billing, German physicist (b. 1914)
- 10 January – Oliver Smithies, British-American biochemist and Nobel Prize winner (b. 1925)
- 16 January – Eugene Cernan, American astronaut, Apollo 17 (b. 1934)
- 7 February – Hans Rosling, Swedish statistician (b. 1948)
- 8 February – Peter Mansfield, British physicist and Nobel Prize winner (b. 1933)
- 20 February – Mildred Dresselhaus, American physicist, Presidential Medal of Freedom and National Medal of Science laureate, "queen of carbon science" (b. 1930)
- 21 February – Kenneth Arrow, American economist and Nobel Prize winner (b. 1921)
- 26 February – Ludvig Faddeev, Russian physicist and mathematician (b. 1934)
- 7 March – Hans Georg Dehmelt, German-American physicist and Nobel Prize winner (b. 1922)
- 8 March – George Andrew Olah, Hungarian-American chemist and Nobel Prize winner (b. 1927)
- 29 March – Alexei Abrikosov, Russian-American physicist and Nobel Prize winner (b. 1928)
- 14 July – Maryam Mirzakhani, Iranian mathematician and the first female Fields Medalist (b. 1977)
- 5 September – Nicolaas Bloembergen, Dutch-American physicist and Nobel Prize winner (b. 1920)
- 30 September – Vladimir Voevodsky, Russian mathematician and Fields Medalist (b. 1966)
- 18 November – Fotis Kafatos, Greek biologist and founding president of the European Research Council (b. 1940)

== See also ==
- 2017 in spaceflight
- List of emerging technologies
- List of years in science
