= MTFP =

MTFP may refer to:

- Montana Free Press, news organization
- Medium Term Fiscal Plan, as used by the Finance Commission of India
- Museum Teacher Fellowship Program, from the United States Holocaust Memorial Museum
- Music Theater Foundation of the Philippines, a non-profit organization founded by Fides Cuyugan-Asensio

== See also ==
- MTFP1, mitochondrial fission process 1, a human gene
