= ZBTB48 =

Protein found in humans

Identifiers
- Aliases: ZBTB48, HKR3, ZNF855, pp9964, zinc finger and BTB domain containing 48, TZAP, telomeric zinc-finger associated protein
- External IDs: OMIM: 165270; MGI: 2140248; GeneCards: ZBTB48
Available structures
PDB	Ortholog search: PDBe RCSB
PDB	List of PDB id codes 3B84

Gene location (Human)
Chr.	Chromosome 1 (human)
Band	1p36.31	Start	6,579,994 bp
Band	1p36.31	End	6,589,280 bp

Gene location (Mouse)
Chr.	Chromosome 4 (mouse)
Band	4|4 E2	Start	152,104,231 bp
Band	4|4 E2	End	152,112,128 bp
RNA expression pattern
Bgee	Human / Mouse (ortholog); Top expressed in: right lobe of liver; left testis; granulocyte; right testis; mucosa of transverse colon; right lobe of thyroid gland; anterior pituitary; right ovary; left lobe of thyroid gland; spleen / Top expressed in: spermatocyte; morula; granulocyte; primary oocyte; spermatid; female urethra; ventricular zone; male urethra; neural layer of retina; left lobe of liver; More reference expression data
BioGPS	n/a
Gene ontology
Molecular function	DNA-binding transcription factor activity; DNA binding; protein binding; metal ion binding; nucleic acid binding; identical protein binding; double-stranded telomeric DNA binding; DNA-binding transcription factor activity, RNA polymerase II-specific
Cellular component	nucleus; nucleoplasm; cytosol; telomere; chromosome
Biological process	regulation of transcription, DNA-templated; transcription, DNA-templated; telomere maintenance via telomere lengthening; positive regulation of transcription, DNA-templated; regulation of transcription by RNA polymerase II
Sources:Amigo / QuickGO
Orthologs
Databases	NCBI: entry; OMA: entry
Species	Human	Mouse
Entrez	3104	100090
Ensembl	ENSG00000204859	ENSMUSG00000028952
UniProt	P10074	Q1H9T6
RefSeq (mRNA)	NM_001278647; NM_001278648; NM_005341	NM_133879; NM_001379628
RefSeq (protein)	NP_001265576; NP_001265577; NP_005332	NP_598640; NP_001366557
Location (UCSC)	Chr 1: 6.58 – 6.59 Mb	Chr 4: 152.1 – 152.11 Mb
PubMed search
- Wikidata
View/Edit Human	View/Edit Mouse

Zinc finger and BTB domain containing 48 (ZBTB48), also known as telomeric zinc-finger associated protein (TZAP), is a protein that directly binds to the double-stranded repeat sequence of telomeres. In humans it is encoded by the ZBTB48 gene.

Loss of ZBTB48 has been shown to lead to telomere elongation both in cells with long and short telomeres. In addition, overexpression of ZBTB48 in cancer cells maintaining their telomeres based on the Alternative Lengthening of Telomeres (ALT) mechanism leads to trimming of telomeres. Beyond its telomeric function, ZBTB48 acts as a transcriptional activator on a small set of target genes, including mitochondrial fission process 1 (MTFP1) and CDKN2A. ZBTB48 localizes to chromosome 1p36, a region that is frequently rearranged (leiomyoma and leukaemia) or deleted (neuroblastoma, melanoma, Merkel cell carcinoma, pheochromocytoma, and carcinomas of colon and breast) in different human cancers and therefore might be a putative tumour suppressor, but not without dispute.
