= Trodusquemine =

Chemical compound

Clinical data
- Other names: MSI-1436
- ATC code: None

Identifiers
- IUPAC name: [(3R,6R)-6-[(3S,5R,7R,8R,9S,10S,13R,14S,17R)-3-[3-[4-(3-Aminopropylamino)butylamino]propylamino]-7-hydroxy-10,13-dimethyl-2,3,4,5,6,7,8,9,11,12,14,15,16,17-tetradecahydro-1H-cyclopenta[a]phenanthren-17-yl]-2-methylheptan-3-yl] hydrogen sulfate
- CAS Number: 186139-09-3
- PubChem CID: 9917968
- DrugBank: DB06333
- ChemSpider: 8093615
- UNII: KKC12PIF16
- KEGG: D06252
- ChEMBL: ChEMBL508583
- CompTox Dashboard (EPA): DTXSID701317590

Chemical and physical data
- Formula: C_{37}H_{72}N_{4}O_{5}S
- Molar mass: 685.07 g·mol^{−1}
- 3D model (JSmol): Interactive image
- SMILES: C[C@H](CC[C@H](C(C)C)OS(=O)(=O)O)[C@H]1CC[C@@H]2[C@@]1(CC[C@H]3[C@H]2[C@@H](C[C@@H]4[C@@]3(CC[C@@H](C4)NCCCNCCCCNCCCN)C)O)C
- InChI: InChI=1S/C37H72N4O5S/c1-26(2)34(46-47(43,44)45)13-10-27(3)30-11-12-31-35-32(15-17-37(30,31)5)36(4)16-14-29(24-28(36)25-33(35)42)41-23-9-22-40-20-7-6-19-39-21-8-18-38/h26-35,39-42H,6-25,38H2,1-5H3,(H,43,44,45)/t27-,28-,29+,30-,31+,32+,33-,34-,35+,36+,37-/m1/s1; Key:WUJVPODXELZABP-FWJXURDUSA-N

Trodusquemine is an aminosterol (polyamine steroid conjugate) that inhibits protein tyrosine phosphatase 1B (PTP1B) activity. The compound exhibits broad-spectrum antimicrobial activity and numerous regenerative, neuroprotective, anti-atherosclerotic, antitumor, antiangiogenic, antiobesity, and anxiolytic properties. Phase I clinical trials of trodusquemine have demonstrated good tolerability, but several planned phase II trials were halted due to financial difficulties of the developer.

== Chemistry ==
Trodusquemine is a spermine metabolite of cholesterol. The steroid ring consists of a cholestane with a hydroxyl group at C-7 and sulfate group at C-24; spermine is conjugated to the steroid moiety at C-3. It is structurally similar to squalamine, which features a spermidine moiety instead of spermine.

== Pharmacology ==
Trodusquemine is a non-competitive allosteric inhibitor of protein tyrosine phosphatase 1B (PTP1B) with an IC50 value of 1 μmol/L. Inhibition of PTP1B prevents dephosphorylation of the insulin receptor, thereby increasing insulin signaling and lowering blood glucose. Trodusquemine also demonstrates affinity for the dopamine transporter (IC_{50} 0.4 μmol/L) and norepinephrine transporter (IC_{50} 0.7 μmol/L).

Trodusquemine suppresses appetite, promotes weight loss, and rescues hyperglycemia in genetic mouse models of obesity (ob/ob) and diabetes (db/db). Other effects of trodusquemine include amelioration of the metabolic syndrome in mouse models of insulin resistance; correction of hepatic steatosis in ob/ob mice; reversal of atherosclerosis in LDLR knock-out mice; inhibition of the growth of malignancy in rodents; stimulation of the regeneration of tail-fin and heart muscle in zebrafish; stimulation of regenerative repair of myocardial infarction and traumatic limb muscle injury in adult mice; prevention of aortic valve calcification in a mouse atheroma model; stimulation of T-cell anti-tumor immunity in a mouse model; correction of systemic and hepatic inflammation, insulin resistance and hepatic dysfunction in horses suffering from equine metabolic syndrome.

Demonstrations of trodusquemine's neuroprotective effects include reversal of memory impairment, normalization of behavior, reduction of neuronal loss and increase in healthspan and lifespan in mouse models of Alzheimer's disease; reduction in alpha-synuclein aggregation and increase in healthspan and lifespan in a C.elegans model of Parkinson's disease; Trodusquemine may exert its effects by targeting specific centers in the brain. Trodusquemine may also have anxiolytic properties.

Although the physiological basis for the healthy lifespan of certain shark species remains unknown, trodusquemine targets well-recognized aging associated processes at both the cellular level and in vivo across many species. These observations conducted in different laboratories suggest that Trodusquemine represents a novel endogenous vertebrate geroprotector.

== History ==
Trodusquemine was originally isolated from liver extracts of the spiny dogfish (Squalus acanthias). It was discovered through a search for antimicrobial compounds in Squaliformes, which lack a robust adaptive immune system. It was hypothesized that their innate immunity might be conferred by endogenous production of antimicrobial compounds.
