= MTFP1 =

Protein-coding gene in the species Homo sapiens

Identifiers
- Aliases: MTFP1, MTP18, HSPC242, mitochondrial fission process 1
- External IDs: OMIM: 610235; MGI: 1916686; GeneCards: MTFP1

Gene location (Human)
Chr.	Chromosome 22 (human)
Band	22q12.2	Start	30,425,623 bp
Band	22q12.2	End	30,429,054 bp

Gene location (Mouse)
Chr.	Chromosome 11 (mouse)
Band	11|11 A1	Start	4,041,480 bp
Band	11|11 A1	End	4,045,445 bp
RNA expression pattern
Bgee	Human / Mouse (ortholog); Top expressed in: mucosa of transverse colon; apex of heart; human kidney; gonad; left ventricle; renal cortex; gastrocnemius muscle; right auricle of heart; right lobe of liver; testicle / Top expressed in: interventricular septum; digastric muscle; myocardium of ventricle; subiculum; soleus muscle; extraocular muscle; sternocleidomastoid muscle; anterior amygdaloid area; temporal muscle; dentate gyrus of hippocampal formation granule cell; More reference expression data
BioGPS	n/a
Orthologs
Databases	NCBI: entry; OMA: entry
Species	Human	Mouse
Entrez	51537	67900
Ensembl	ENSG00000242114	ENSMUSG00000004748
UniProt	Q9UDX5	Q9CRB8
RefSeq (mRNA)	NM_016498; NM_001003704	NM_026443
RefSeq (protein)	NP_001003704; NP_057582	NP_080719
Location (UCSC)	Chr 22: 30.43 – 30.43 Mb	Chr 11: 4.04 – 4.05 Mb
PubMed search
- Wikidata
View/Edit Human	View/Edit Mouse

Mitochondrial fission process protein 1 is a protein that in humans is encoded by the MTFP1 gene (previously MTP18). This protein acts to inhibit the fusion of mitochondria. This functions as a quality control mechanism that prevents defective inner mitochondrial membranes from undergoing fusion with other mitochondria.
