= List of asteroid close approaches to Earth in 2017 =

- Asteroids which came closer to Earth than the Moon in 2017 by time of discovery
- After closest approach: 23 (41.8%)
- < 24 hours before: 6 (10.9%)
- up to 7 days before: 24 (43.6%)
- > one week before: 1 (1.8%)
- > 7 weeks before: 0 (0.0%)
- > one year before: 1 (1.8%)
Other years

Below is the list of asteroid close approaches to Earth in 2017.

== Timeline of known close approaches less than one lunar distance from Earth in 2017 ==
A list of known near-Earth asteroid close approaches less than 1 lunar distance (0.0025696 AU (384,410 km; 238,860 mi)) from Earth in 2017, based on the close approach database of the Center for Near-Earth Object Studies (CNEOS).

For reference, the radius of Earth is approximately 0.0000426 AU (6,370 km; 3,960 mi) or 0.0166 lunar distances.
Geosynchronous satellites have an orbit with semi-major axis length of 0.000282 AU (42,200 km; 26,200 mi) or 0.110 lunar distances. In 2017, four known asteroids have traveled nearer than this: 2017 GM, 2017 UJ2, 2017 EA, and 2017 WE30. Unconfirmed asteroids YU95BEF, P10ELNY and A104Vqx probably have traveled nearer, but knowledge of their orbits is too poor to be sure.

The CNEOS database of close approaches lists some close approaches a full orbit or more before the discovery of the object, derived by orbit calculation. The list below only includes close approaches that are evidenced by observations, thus the pre-discovery close approaches are only included if the object was found by precovery.

This list and relevant databases do not consider impacts as close approaches, thus this list does not include any of the 29 objects that collided with Earth's atmosphere in 2017, none of which were discovered in advance, but were observed visually or recorded by sensors designed to detect detonation of nuclear devices.

Rows highlighted red indicate objects which were not discovered until after closest approach

Rows highlighted yellow indicate objects discovered less than 24 hours before closest approach

Rows highlighted green indicate objects discovered more than one week before closest approach

Rows highlighted turquoise indicate objects discovered more than 7 weeks before closest approach

Rows highlighted blue indicate objects discovered more than one year before closest approach
(i.e. objects successfully cataloged on a previous orbit, rather than being detected during final approach)

Date of closest approach	Date discovered	Object	Nominal geocentric distance (AU) (Note: Distance from the center of Earth to the center of the object. See the NASA/JPL Solar System Dynamics Glossary: Geocentric. Earth has a radius of approximately 6,400 km.)	Nominal geocentric dist. (LD)	Size (m) (approx.)	(H) (abs. mag.)	Closer to Moon?
2017-01-09	2017-01-07	2017 AG13	0.00139 AU (208,000 km; 129,000 mi)	0.543	16–36	26.1	
2017-01-25	2017-01-20	2017 BX	0.00178 AU (266,000 km; 165,000 mi)	0.693	6.7–15	28.0	
2017-01-30	2017-01-29	2017 BH_{30}	0.000347 AU (51,900 km; 32,300 mi)	0.135 (Note: Closest approach for 2017 BH_{30} was over the Taymyr Peninsula.)	4.6–10	28.8	
2017-02-02	2017-01-30	2017 BS_{32}	0.00109 AU (163,000 km; 101,000 mi)	0.423	8.1–18	27.6	
2017-02-23	2017-02-21	2017 DG_{16}	0.000920 AU (137,600 km; 85,500 mi)	0.358	3.7–8.2	29.3	Yes
2017-02-25	2017-02-22	2017 DR_{34}	0.00149 AU (223,000 km; 139,000 mi)	0.581	3.8–8.6	29.2	
2017-03-02	2017-03-02	2017 EA	0.000140 AU (20,900 km; 13,000 mi)	0.054	1.8–4.1	30.8	
2017-03-05	2017-02-27	2017 DS_{109}	0.00236 AU (353,000 km; 219,000 mi)	0.919	16–35	26.2	
2017-03-17	2017-03-16	(573971) 2009 WW_{221} = 2017 FW_{158}	0.000816 AU (122,100 km; 75,900 mi)	0.317	5.6–13	28.4	
2017-03-17	2017-03-19	2017 FD_{3}	0.00120 AU (180,000 km; 112,000 mi)	0.468	7.7–17	27.7	
2017-03-19	2017-03-17	2017 FS	0.000730 AU (109,200 km; 67,900 mi)	0.284	4.4–9.9	28.9	
2017-03-20	2017-03-21	2017 FX_{158}	0.00182 AU (272,000 km; 169,000 mi)	0.707	4.3–9.5	29.0	
2017-03-20	2017-03-20	2017 FN_{1}	0.000423 AU (63,300 km; 39,300 mi)	0.165	2–4.5	30.6	
2017-03-20	2017-03-20	2017 FM_{1}	0.000856 AU (128,100 km; 79,600 mi)	0.333	3.3–7.5	29.5	
2017-03-30	2017-03-25	2017 FJ_{101}	0.00217 AU (325,000 km; 202,000 mi)	0.846	4.8–11	28.3	
2017-04-02	2017-03-29	2017 FU_{102}	0.00146 AU (218,000 km; 136,000 mi)	0.569	4.8–11	28.7	
2017-04-04	2017-04-03	2017 GM	0.000109 AU (16,300 km; 10,100 mi)	0.042	2.8–6.2	29.9	
2017-04-16	2017-04-17	2017 HJ	0.000908 AU (135,800 km; 84,400 mi)	0.353	8.3–19	27.5	
2017-04-21	2017-04-27	2017 HG_{49}	0.00238 AU (356,000 km; 221,000 mi)	0.927	8.4–19	27.5	
2017-04-22	2017-04-26	2017 HG_{4}	0.00156 AU (233,000 km; 145,000 mi)	0.607	7.7–17	27.7	
2017-04-23	2017-04-22	2017 HV_{2}	0.000838 AU (125,400 km; 77,900 mi)	0.326	4.4–9.9	28.9	
2017-05-02	2017-05-01	2017 JA	0.000666 AU (99,600 km; 61,900 mi)	0.259	4–9	28.9	
2017-05-04	2017-05-02	2017 JQ_{1}	0.00114 AU (171,000 km; 106,000 mi)	0.442	3.7–8.2	29.4	
2017-05-04	2017-05-06	2017 JB_{2}	0.000372 AU (55,700 km; 34,600 mi)	0.145	3.8–8.6	29.0	
2017-07-21	2017-07-23	2017 OO1	0.000852 AU (127,500 km; 79,200 mi)	0.332	33–75	24.4	
2017-08-14	2017-08-16	2017 QP1	0.000419 AU (62,700 km; 38,900 mi)	0.163	37–83	24.3	
2017-08-20	2017-08-18	2017 QN_{2}	0.00145 AU (217,000 km; 135,000 mi)	0.563	5.8–13	27.9	
2017-08-29	2019-02-26 (Note: Precovery around this close approach: 2017-08-16 to 2017-08-28)	2019 DP	0.000409 AU (61,200 km; 38,000 mi)	0.159	26–58	25.1	
2017-09-03	2017-08-31	2017 QB_{35}	0.00238 AU (356,000 km; 221,000 mi)	0.928	3.7–8.2	29.3	
2017-09-14	2017-09-18	2017 SQ_{2}	0.00133 AU (199,000 km; 124,000 mi)	0.517	18–41	25.8	
2017-09-20	2017-09-17	2017 SM_{2}	0.00207 AU (310,000 km; 192,000 mi)	0.806	9.2–21	27.3	
2017-09-20	2017-09-21	2017 SZ_{32}	0.00138 AU (206,000 km; 128,000 mi)	0.535	3.8–8.4	29.3	Yes
2017-09-20	2017-09-20	2017 SR_{2}	0.000623 AU (93,200 km; 57,900 mi)	0.243	5.1–11	28.6	
2017-09-24	2017-09-26	2017 SU_{17}	0.00185 AU (277,000 km; 172,000 mi)	0.720	6.7–15	28.0	
2017-09-24	2017-09-25	2017 SS_{12}	0.00172 AU (257,000 km; 160,000 mi)	0.670	10–23	27.0	Yes
2017-09-30	2017-10-01	2017 TQ_{2}	0.000691 AU (103,400 km; 64,200 mi)	0.269	3.6–7.9	29.4	
2017-10-02	2017-09-29	2017 SX_{17}	0.000582 AU (87,100 km; 54,100 mi)	0.227	5.8–13	28.3	
2017-10-10	2017-10-14	2017 TF_{5}	0.00188 AU (281,000 km; 175,000 mi)	0.730	21–47	25.5	
2017-10-12	2012-10-04	2012 TC4	0.000335 AU (50,100 km; 31,100 mi)	0.130 (Note: This will mark the first time an asteroid was observed passing less than 1 LD to the Earth on two different occasions.)	12–27	26.7	
2017-10-15	2017-10-16	2017 UF	0.00255 AU (381,000 km; 237,000 mi)	0.991	7–16	27.9	
2017-10-16	2017-10-15	2017 TH_{5}	0.000668 AU (99,900 km; 62,100 mi)	0.260	5.6–12	28.4	
2017-10-17	2017-10-19	2017 UR_{2}	0.00213 AU (319,000 km; 198,000 mi)	0.829	7.7–17	27.7	
2017-10-19	2017-10-11	2017 TD6	0.00128 AU (191,000 km; 119,000 mi)	0.497	9.7–22	27.2	Yes
2017-10-20	2017-10-21	2017 UJ_{2}	0.000120 AU (18,000 km; 11,200 mi)	0.047	1.8–3.9	30.9	
2017-10-21	2017-10-25	2017 UA_{52}	0.00131 AU (196,000 km; 122,000 mi)	0.511	5.3–12	28.5	Yes
2017-10-28	2017-10-27	2017 UL_{6}	0.000398 AU (59,500 km; 37,000 mi)	0.155	1.1–2.4	32.0	
2017-10-30	2017-10-29	2017 UK_{8}	0.00151 AU (226,000 km; 140,000 mi)	0.588	6.1–14	28.2	
2017-11-04	2017-11-05	2017 VE	0.00227 AU (340,000 km; 211,000 mi)	0.885	13–28	26.6	
2017-11-09	2017-11-10	2017 VL2	0.000787 AU (117,700 km; 73,200 mi)	0.306	16–36	26.1	
2017-11-13	2017-11-15	2017 VF_{14}	0.00205 AU (307,000 km; 191,000 mi)	0.796	5.3–12	28.5	
2017-11-21	2017-11-20	2017 WW_{1}	0.000942 AU (140,900 km; 87,600 mi)	0.367	3.1–6.8	29.7	
2017-11-21	2017-11-22	2017 WA_{14}	0.000633 AU (94,700 km; 58,800 mi)	0.246	8.8–20	27.4	
2017-11-26	2017-11-26	2017 WE_{30}	0.000201 AU (30,100 km; 18,700 mi)	0.078	1.2–2.6	31.8	
2017-12-28	2017-12-25	2017 YZ_{4}	0.00149 AU (223,000 km; 139,000 mi)	0.582	6.4–14	28.1	
2017-12-30	2017-12-28	2017 YE_{7}	0.00206 AU (308,000 km; 191,000 mi)	0.801	5.3–12	28.5	

In addition to the confirmed asteroids on the above list, which feature in the CNEOS close approach database, there have been well-observed unconfirmed or confirmed but poorly observed objects with a 50% or greater chance of passing within 1 LD of the Earth, which are listed separately below.

Date of closest approach	Date discovered	Object	Nominal geocentric distance (AU)	Nominal geocentric dist. (LD)	Size (m) (approx.)	(H) (abs. mag.)	Closer to Moon?
2017-10-13	2017-10-21 (Unconfirmed)	YT80190	0.000537 AU (80,300 km; 49,900 mi)	0.21 (Note: distance error: 0.0000894 AU, approach range: 0.17 to 0.24 LD. The asteroid is unconfirmed and will likely never receive a provisional designation.)	2–6	30.4	
2017-10-22	2017-10-30 (Unconfirmed)	YU92F9B	0.00121 AU (181,000 km; 112,000 mi)	0.47 (Note: distance error: 0.000283 AU, approach range: 0.36 to 0.58 LD. The asteroid is unconfirmed and will likely never receive a provisional designation.)	3–10	29.2	
2017-10-22	2017-10-30 (Unconfirmed)	YU95BEF	0.000130 AU (19,400 km; 12,100 mi)	0.051 (Note: distance error: 0.0000611 AU, approach range: 0.027 to 0.074 LD. The asteroid is unconfirmed and will likely never receive a provisional designation.)	5–15	28.2	
2017-11-14	2017-11-20 (Unconfirmed)	P10ELNY	0.000212 AU (31,700 km; 19,700 mi)	0.083 (Note: distance error: 0.000121 AU, approach range: 0.035 to 0.13 LD. The asteroid is unconfirmed and will likely never receive a provisional designation.)	4–12	28.8	
2017-11-08	2017-11-16 (Unconfirmed)	A104Vqx	0.000222 AU (33,200 km; 20,600 mi)	0.086 (Note: distance error: 0.000163 AU, approach range: 0.023 to 0.15 LD. The asteroid is unconfirmed and will likely never receive a provisional designation.)	4–14	28.4	

=== Warning times by size ===
This sub-section visualises the warning times of the close approaches listed in the table of confirmed close approaches, depending on the size of the asteroid. The sizes of the charts show the relative sizes of the asteroids to scale. For comparison, the approximate size of a person is also shown. This is based the absolute magnitude of each asteroid, an approximate measure of size based on brightness.

Absolute magnitude H ≥ 30 (smallest)

Silhouette of man standing and facing forward

(size of a person for comparison)

Absolute magnitude 30 > H ≥ 29

Absolute magnitude 29 > H ≥ 28

Absolute magnitude 28 > H ≥ 27

Absolute magnitude 27 > H ≥ 26

Absolute magnitude 26 > H ≥ 25

Absolute magnitude 25 > H (largest)

- After closest approach: 2 (100.0%)
- < 24 hours before: 0 (0.0%)
- up to 7 days before: 0 (0.0%)
- > one week before: 0 (0.0%)
- > 7 weeks before: 0 (0.0%)
- > one year before: 0 (0.0%)

== Timeline of close approaches less than one lunar distance from the Moon in 2017 ==
The number of asteroids listed here are significantly less than those of asteroids that approach Earth for several reasons. Asteroids that approach Earth not only move faster, but are brighter and are easier to detect with modern surveys because:

- Asteroids that come closer to Earth are a higher priority to confirm, and only confirmed asteroids are listed with a lunocentric approach distance.
- Those that closely approach the Moon are frequently lost in its glare, making them harder to confirm. They are similarly hard to discover during the new moon, when the Moon is too close to the Sun to detect asteroids while they are near the Moon.

These factors severely limit the amount of Moon-approaching asteroids, to a level many times lower than the asteroids detected passing as close to Earth.

Date of closest approach	Object	Nominal lunocentric distance (AU) (Note: Distance from the center of the Moon to the center of the object. The Moon has a radius of approximately 1,740 km.)	Nominal lunocentric distance (LD)	Size (m) (approximate)	(H)	Approach distance to Earth (LD)
2017-01-25	2017 BA_{7}	0.00187 AU (280,000 km; 174,000 mi)	0.73	5–16	28.1	1.12
2017-01-25	2017 BX	0.00209 AU (313,000 km; 194,000 mi)	0.81	5–18	28.0	0.69
2017-01-30	2017 BH_{30}	0.00187 AU (280,000 km; 174,000 mi)	0.73	4–12	28.8	0.13
2017-02-03	2017 BS_{32}	0.00193 AU (289,000 km; 179,000 mi)	0.75	7–24	27.3	0.42
2017-02-24	2017 DG_{16}	0.000555 AU (83,000 km; 51,600 mi)	0.22 (Note: This is the closest any known asteroid has passed to the Moon in nearly three years, after 2014 GY_{44} passed 0.097 LD from the Moon in March 2014.)	3–9	29.3	0.36
2017-02-25	2017 DR_{34}	0.00179 AU (268,000 km; 166,000 mi)	0.70	3–11	29.1	0.58
2017-03-02	2017 EA	0.00224 AU (335,000 km; 208,000 mi)	0.87	1–5	30.8	0.054
2017-03-17	2017 FD_{3}	0.00236 AU (353,000 km; 219,000 mi)	0.92	6–20	27.7	0.47
2017-03-17	2017 FW_{158}	0.00104 AU (156,000 km; 97,000 mi)	0.40	5–14	28.4	0.32
2017-04-04	2017 GM	0.00227 AU (340,000 km; 211,000 mi)	0.88	2–7	29.9	0.042
2017-04-21	2017 HG_{4}	0.00177 AU (265,000 km; 165,000 mi)	0.69	6–21	27.6	0.61
2017-04-24	2017 HV_{2}	0.00230 AU (344,000 km; 214,000 mi)	0.90	3–12	28.9	0.33
2017-05-02	2017 JA	0.00251 AU (375,000 km; 233,000 mi)	0.98	3–13	28.9	0.26
2017-05-02	2017 JB_{2}	0.00188 AU (281,000 km; 175,000 mi)	0.73	3–11	29.0	0.14
2017-05-03	2017 JQ_{1}	0.00247 AU (370,000 km; 230,000 mi)	0.96	3–9	29.4	0.44
2017-05-31	2017 KW_{31}	0.00114 AU (171,000 km; 106,000 mi)	0.45	10–36	26.5	1.23
2017-07-21	2017 OO1	0.00236 AU (353,000 km; 219,000 mi)	0.92	25–90	24.5	0.30
2017-08-14	2017 QP1	0.00230 AU (344,000 km; 214,000 mi)	0.90	31–91	24.3	0.16
2017-08-21	2017 QN_{2}	0.00176 AU (263,000 km; 164,000 mi)	0.69	5–22	27.9	0.56
2017-08-26	2017 QQ_{17}	0.00242 AU (362,000 km; 225,000 mi)	0.94	4–17	28.3	1.02
2017-09-03	2017 QB_{35}	0.00245 AU (367,000 km; 228,000 mi)	0.95	3–9	29.3	0.93
2017-09-16	2017 RW_{17}	0.00175 AU (262,000 km; 163,000 mi)	0.68	2–7	29.8	1.08
2017-09-20	2017 SZ_{32}	0.00129 AU (193,000 km; 120,000 mi)	0.50	3–9	29.2	0.53
2017-09-20	2017 SM_{2}	0.00213 AU (319,000 km; 198,000 mi)	0.83	6–26	27.3	0.81
2017-09-24	2017 SS_{12}	0.000320 AU (47,900 km; 29,700 mi)	0.12	8–27	27.0	0.67
2017-09-30	2017 TQ_{2}	0.00221 AU (331,000 km; 205,000 mi)	0.86	3–8	29.4	0.27
2017-10-02	2017 SX_{17}	0.00174 AU (260,000 km; 162,000 mi)	0.68	4–16	28.1	0.22
2017-10-12	2012 TC4	0.00186 AU (278,000 km; 173,000 mi)	0.72	10–31	26.7	0.23
2017-10-13	YT80190	0.00208 AU (311,000 km; 193,000 mi)	0.81 (Note: distance error: 0.00000802 AU, approach range: 0.807 to 0.814 LD. The asteroid is unconfirmed and will likely never receive a provisional designation.)	2–6	30.4	0.21
2017-10-17	2017 TH_{5}	0.00142 AU (212,000 km; 132,000 mi)	0.55	4–18	28.2	0.26
2017-10-20	2017 UJ_{2}	0.00166 AU (248,000 km; 154,000 mi)	0.65	1–5	30.8	0.047
2017-10-20	2017 TD_{6}	0.000756 AU (113,100 km; 70,300 mi)	0.29	7–28	27.2	0.50
2017-10-20	2017 UA_{52}	0.000288 AU (43,100 km; 26,800 mi)	0.11 (Note: This is the closest any known asteroid has passed to the Moon in nearly three years (even closer than 2017 DG_{16}) after 2014 GY_{44} passed 0.097 LD from the Moon in March 2014.)	4–15	28.3	0.51
2017-10-22	YU95BEF	0.000481 AU (72,000 km; 44,700 mi)	0.19 (Note: distance error: 0.00000171 AU, approach range: 0.181 to 0.194 LD. The asteroid is unconfirmed and will likely never receive a provisional designation.)	5–15	28.2	0.051
2017-10-24	2017 UK_{3}	0.00207 AU (310,000 km; 192,000 mi)	0.80	7–28	27.2	1.38
2017-11-09	2017 VL_{2}	0.00254 AU (380,000 km; 236,000 mi)	0.990	13–42	26.1	0.31
2017-11-09	A104Vqx	0.00204 AU (305,000 km; 190,000 mi)	0.80 (Note: distance error: 0.0000188 AU, approach range: 0.788 to 0.803 LD. The asteroid is unconfirmed and will likely never receive a provisional designation.)	4–14	28.4	0.086
2017-11-13	2017 VF_{14}	0.00243 AU (364,000 km; 226,000 mi)	0.94	4–14	28.5	0.80
2017-11-14	P10ELNY	0.00196 AU (293,000 km; 182,000 mi)	0.76 (Note: distance error: 0.000177 AU, approach range: 0.69 to 0.83 LD. The asteroid is unconfirmed and will likely never receive a provisional designation.)	4–12	28.8	0.083
2017-12-18	2017 YJ_{1}	0.00142 AU (212,000 km; 132,000 mi)	0.55	6–26	27.5	1.044
2017-12-28	2017 YZ_{4}	0.00175 AU (262,000 km; 163,000 mi)	0.68	4–18	28.2	0.58

== Additional examples ==
Radar animation of 2017 BQ6 during closest approach on 7 February 2017

Radar animation of 2014 JO25 during closest approach on 19 April 2017

An example list of near-Earth asteroids that passed or will pass more than 1 lunar distance (384,400 km or 0.00256 AU) from Earth in 2017.

Object	Size (meters)	Lunar distances	Date
2017 AP_{19}	65	3.34	6 January 2017
2017 BJ_{30}	16	1.03	31 January 2017
2017 BQ6	186	6.57	7 February 2017
2017 DZ_{37}	7	1.005	23 February 2017
2017 DV_{36}	9	1.02	27 February 2017
1998 SL_{36}	313	8.34	16 March 2017
2017 FT_{102}	4	1.05; 1.04 moon	3 April 2017
2014 JO25	823	4.57	19 April 2017
(418094) 2007 WV_{4}	890	7.96	1 June 2017
2017 KQ_{27}	30	1.02; 1.34 moon	6 June 2017
2017 MF	20	1.21 moon	19 June 2017
2017 NT_{5}	110	1.11; 1.27 moon	14 July 2017
2006 SR_{131}	8	0.32 and 11	17–28 September 2017
(496817) 1989 VB	394	7.88	29 September 2017
YT83F29	4	2.6; 0.73 moon	14 October 2017
(171576) 1999 VP_{11}	685	5.77	22 October 2017
(444584) 2006 UK	313	8.66	17 November 2017

== Statistics ==
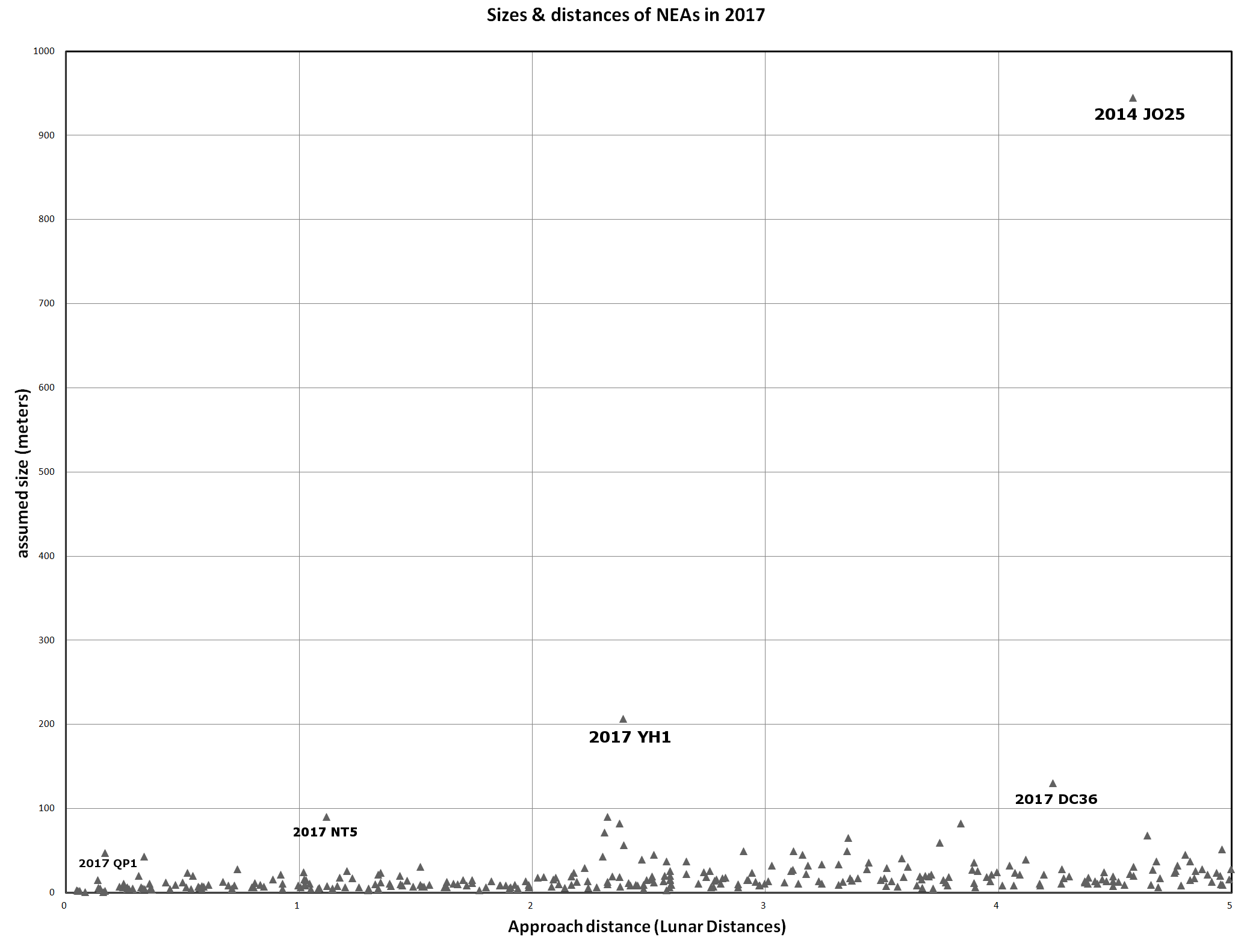
Graph of near-Earth object sizes and close approaches in 2017. Shown here, asteroid 2014 JO25 was the largest asteroid that has approached within 5 LD from Earth in 2017.

Discoveries by month
month	<1 LD	<5 LD
January	3	17
February	3	27
March	9	34
April	5	28
May	3	14
June	0	10
July	1	11
August	2	17
September	5	32
October	14	52
November	8	29
December	2	28

Discoveries by size
Abs. mag	<1 LD	<5 LD
H <20	0	1
<21	0	0
<22	0	1
<23	0	3
<24	0	7
<25	3	19
<26	2	40
<27	4	74
<28	11	72
<29	18	57
<30	13	19
<31	4	5
<32	1	1
<33	1	1

Discoveries by survey
Survey	<1 LD	<5 LD
408 – Mount Nyukasa Station	0	1
703 – Catalina Sky Survey	12	52
704 – Lincoln Laboratory ETS	0	1
C51 – WISE	0	1
F51 – Pan-STARRS 1	10	56
G45 – Space Surveillance Telescope	0	3
G96 – Mt. Lemmon Survey	28	157
I52 – Steward Observatory, Mount Lemmon	0	1
J04 – ESA OGS	0	1
K88 – GINOP-KHK	0	1
T05 – ATLAS – Haleakala	2	11
T08 – ATLAS – Mauna Loa	5	15
Y00 – SONEAR	0	2

== Virtual impactors ==
List of asteroids with a Palermo Technical Impact Hazard Scale greater than −6 that are listed on the Sentry Risk Table because they have short observation arcs with poorly constrained orbits and have a chance of impacting Earth in 2017. Given a short observation arc, many different orbits fit the observed data. 2010 XB_{73} could have approached Earth around May 2017 or could have been 9 AU from Earth on the way to a close approach with Saturn in 2018. A Palermo rating of −4 indicates an event that is 10,000 times less likely than the background hazard level of Earth impacts, which is defined as the average risk posed by objects of the same size or larger over the years until the date of the potential impact.

Date	Object	Estimated diameter (meters)	Obs arc (days)	Impact probability (1 in)	Palermo scale	JPL Horizons nominal geocentric distance (AU)	NEODyS nominal geocentric distance (AU)
2017-05-22	2010 GZ60	2,000 (Note: Discovered and only observed by WISE, an infrared telescope, so no apparent magnitude, and therefore estimated size was provided. As such, the size is only a rough estimate. Observation arc is only 1.3 days. Eccentricity is assumed and the object is lost.)	1.3	830,000,000	-1.83	0.4 AU (60,000,000 km; 37,000,000 mi)	Not listed
2017-05-25	2010 XB_{73}	110	1.1	120,000,000	-4.47	1.6 AU (240,000,000 km; 150,000,000 mi)	9.0 AU (1.35×10^{9} km; 840,000,000 mi)
2017-08-19	2015 ME131	500	1.8	420,000,000	-3.41	0.4 AU (60,000,000 km; 37,000,000 mi)	0.4 AU (60,000,000 km; 37,000,000 mi)
2017-09-18	2015 HV_{182}	157	0.9	7,700,000,000	-5.78	2.3 AU (340,000,000 km; 210,000,000 mi)	2.3 AU (340,000,000 km; 210,000,000 mi)
2017-11-18	2008 VS_{4}	45	0.083	100,000,000	-5.50	4.6 AU (690,000,000 km; 430,000,000 mi)	3.9 AU (580,000,000 km; 360,000,000 mi)
2017-11-29	2007 YM	20	0.13	2,000,000	-5.21	5.1 AU (760,000,000 km; 470,000,000 mi)	5.1 AU (760,000,000 km; 470,000,000 mi)
2017-12-01	2010 GZ_{60}	2,000	1.3	10,000,000,000	-3.62	1.0 AU (150,000,000 km; 93,000,000 mi)	Not listed
2017-12-13	2005 TM_{173}	53	1.9	230,000,000	-5.98	5.7 AU (850,000,000 km; 530,000,000 mi)	5.7 AU (850,000,000 km; 530,000,000 mi)
2017-12-20	2010 GZ_{60}	2,000	1.3	83,000,000	-1.97	1.2 AU (180,000,000 km; 110,000,000 mi)	Not listed

== See also ==
- List of asteroid close approaches to Earth
- List of asteroid close approaches to Earth in 2016
- List of asteroid close approaches to Earth in 2018
- List of bolides (asteroids and meteoroids that impacted Earth)
