= 2016 PQ =

Near-Earth asteroid

Discovery
- Discovered by: Pan-STARRS 1
- Discovery site: Haleakala Obs.
- Discovery date: 2 August 2016

Designations
- Minor planet category: NEO; Apollo; Mars-crosser

Orbital characteristics
- Epoch 4 September 2017 (JD 2458000.5)
- Uncertainty parameter 7
- Observation arc: (5 days)
- Aphelion: 2.9431 AU
- Perihelion: 0.8695 AU
- Semi-major axis: 1.9063 AU
- Eccentricity: 0.5439
- Orbital period (sidereal): 2.63 yr (961 days)
- Mean anomaly: 131.84°
- Mean motion: 0° 22^{m} 28.2^{s} / day
- Inclination: 2.6215°
- Longitude of ascending node: 317.73°
- Argument of perihelion: 53.512°
- Earth MOID: 0.000098 AU (0.038 LD; 14693 km; 2.3 R_{🜨})

Physical characteristics
- Dimensions: 20 m (est. at 0.20; 25.9)
- Absolute magnitude (H): 25.9

2016 PQ is an approximately 20-meter sized asteroid and near-Earth object of the Apollo group, with one of the smallest known minimum orbital intersection distances with Earth.

== Discovery ==
The asteroid was discovered by the Pan-STARRS telescope on 2 August 2016, when it had reached magnitude 20.5, and it had brightened by magnitude 19.0 three nights later, after which it became too close to the Sun to spot with ground-based telescopes. It reached its closest approach to the Earth on 7 August 2016, at 0.025 AU, or 9.8 lunar distances.

== Orbit ==
2016 PQ orbits the Sun at a distance of 0.9–2.9 AU once every 2 years and 8 months (961 days). Its orbit has an eccentricity of 0.54 and an inclination of 3° with respect to the ecliptic.

=== MOID ===
2016 PQ has a very small minimum orbit intersection distance (MOID) to the Earth – only around 14,693 kilometres (9,130 miles), corresponding to 0.038 lunar distances or 2.3 Earth radii. It has the 19th lowest MOID of any known asteroid, as well as the 7th lowest MOID of any object larger than it (after (433953) 1997 XR2, 2006 QV_{89}, (85236) 1993 KH, 2013 TX68, 2014 DA, and 2004 FH).

Despite its very low MOID, it is not on the Sentry Risk Table, as it is not going to make any nearby close approaches to Earth in the near future. It is too small to be classified as a potentially hazardous asteroid.

== See also ==
- List of asteroid close approaches to Earth in 2016
- (893194) 2016 EU85
