= 2017 TD6 =

Micro-asteroid

2017 TD_{6}
Discovery
- Discovered by: Pan-STARRS
- Discovery site: Haleakala Obs.
- Discovery date: 11 October 2017 (first observed only)

Designations
- Minor planet category: NEO · Apollo

Orbital characteristics
- Epoch 4 September 2017 (JD 2458000.5)
- Uncertainty parameter 6
- Observation arc: (8 days)
- Aphelion: 1.5284 AU
- Perihelion: 0.7798 AU
- Semi-major axis: 1.1541 AU
- Eccentricity: 0.3243
- Orbital period (sidereal): 1.24 yr (453 days)
- Mean anomaly: 275.44°
- Mean motion: 0° 47^{m} 42^{s} / day
- Inclination: 1.7198°
- Longitude of ascending node: 26.985°
- Argument of perihelion: 82.738°
- Earth MOID: 0.00034 AU · 0.13 LD

Physical characteristics
- Dimensions: 9.9–22 m 11 m (generic at 0.20)
- Absolute magnitude (H): 27.162 · 27.175

2017 TD_{6} is a micro-asteroid, classified as a near-Earth object of the Apollo group, approximately 10–20 meters in diameter. It was first observed by Pan-STARRS at Haleakala Observatory, Hawaii, on 11 October 2017.

On 19 October 2017, the asteroid transited Earth at a nominal distance of 191,000 km; 119,000 mi (0.001278 AU), which corresponds to 0.5 lunar distances (LD). On the following day it also passed near the Moon at 113,000 km (0.00075575 AU). Peaking near a magnitude of 18, the object was too faint to be seen—except for the largest telescopes.

As of 2018, 2017 TD_{6} has a poorly determined orbit with an uncertainty of 6 and a short observation arc of 8 days only. Due to its small size, the asteroid is likely to remain unobserved until its next, still relatively distant approach, predicted to occur in March 2044, at a distance of 2,030,000 km (0.01358 AU) or 5.3 LD from Earth.

== See also ==
- 2012 TC4 – A similar small asteroid that passed close to the earth on 12 October 2017
