= (893194) 2016 EU85 =

Small near-Earth asteroid

(893194) 2016 EU_{85}
Discovery
- Discovered by: Pan-STARRS
- Discovery site: Haleakala Obs.
- Discovery date: 10 March 2016 (discovery: first observation only)

Designations
- Minor planet category: Apollo; NEO; PHA

Orbital characteristics
- Epoch 4 September 2017 (JD 2458000.5)
- Uncertainty parameter 3
- Observation arc: 1.42 yr (518 days)
- Aphelion: 2.7400 AU
- Perihelion: 0.9561 AU
- Semi-major axis: 1.8480 AU
- Eccentricity: 0.4826
- Orbital period (sidereal): 2.51 yr (918 days)
- Mean anomaly: 303.30°
- Mean motion: 0° 23^{m} 32.28^{s} / day
- Inclination: 2.5966°
- Longitude of ascending node: 359.44°
- Argument of perihelion: 23.527°
- Earth MOID: 0.0065 AU (2.5 LD)

Physical characteristics
- Dimensions: 0.44 km (est. at 0.24)
- Absolute magnitude (H): 19.2

(893194) 2016 EU_{85} is an asteroid, classified as a near-Earth object and potentially hazardous asteroid of the Apollo group, approximately 400 meters in diameter. It was first observed on 10 March 2016, by the Pan-STARRS survey at Haleakala Observatory, Hawaii, United States.

== Orbit ==
2016 EU_{85} orbits the Sun at a distance of 1.0–2.7 AU once every 2 years and 6 months (918 days). Its orbit has an eccentricity of 0.48 and an inclination of 3° with respect to the ecliptic. It has an Earth minimum orbital intersection distance of 0.0065 AU (972,000 km) which translates into 2.5 lunar distances.

== Torino scale ==
2016 EU_{85} is currently rated at level 0 after being rated at level 1 on the Torino Scale by the NEODyS system. It was upgraded to level 1 on 25 March 2016 but downgraded on 30 March 2016. On the Sentry system it did not cross the threshold between the two levels, due to a lower computed impact probability. The asteroid is estimated to have a diameter of 440 metres (1,440 ft; 480 yd). The observation arc was then increased to 78 days.

When rated at Torino Scale level 1, there was a 0.0012% chance or a 1 in 83,000 chance of the asteroid colliding with the Earth, corresponding to a 99.9988% chance the asteroid will miss the Earth. 2016 EU_{85} had been observed 14 times at the observatories Mauna Kea (568), Apache Point (705), Pan-STARRS 1 Haleakala (F51) and Magdalena Ridge Observatory (H01).

2016 EU_{85} was subsequently removed from the list of possible impactors thanks to prediscovery observations found in the Pan-STARRS archive.

== Observations ==
2016 EU_{85} was observed with the Spacewatch 1.8-meter telescopes and also the Vatican Advanced Technology Telescope.

== See also ==
- List of asteroid close approaches to Earth in 2016
