= 2017 OO1 =

Small asteroid

2017 OO_{1}
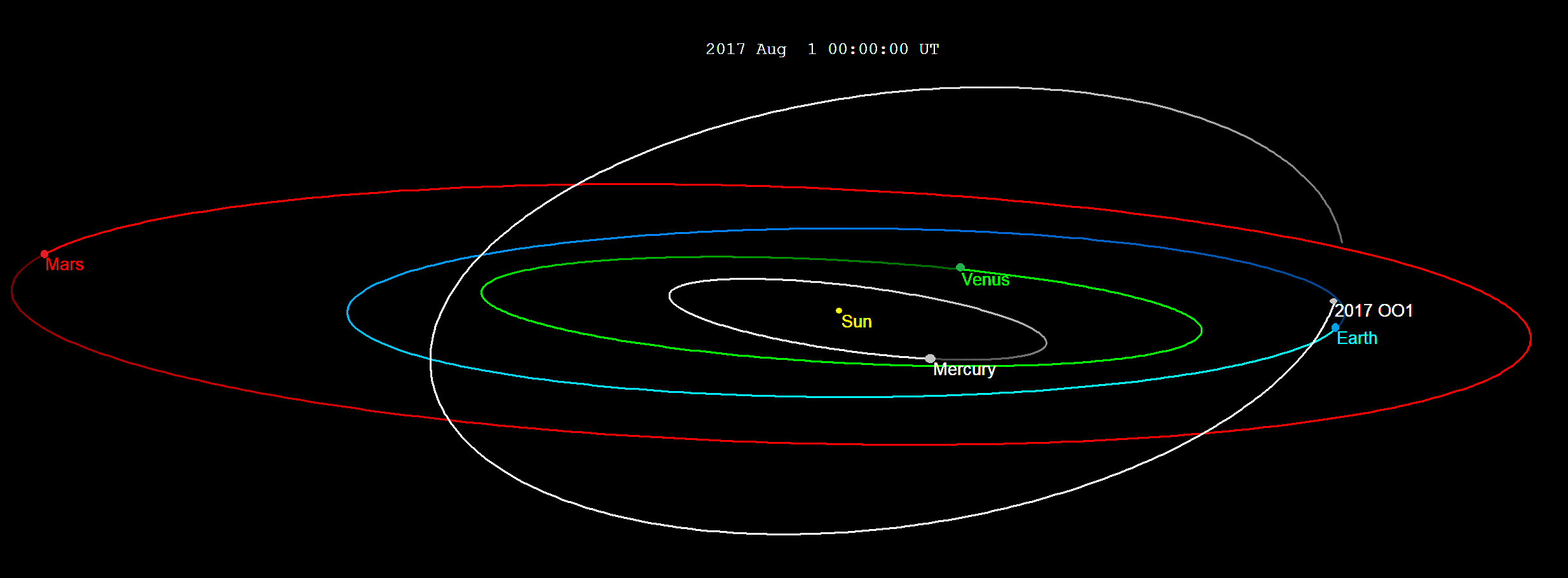
- The orbit of 2017 OO_{1} and positions on 8/1/2017

Discovery
- Discovered by: ATLAS-MLO
- Discovery site: Mauna Loa Obs.
- Discovery date: 23 July 2017 (first observed only)

Designations
- Minor planet category: NEO · Aten

Orbital characteristics
- Epoch 23 March 2018 (JD 2458200.5)
- Uncertainty parameter 4
- Observation arc: 9 days
- Aphelion: 1.0173 AU
- Perihelion: 0.7714 AU
- Semi-major axis: 0.8943 AU
- Eccentricity: 0.1375
- Orbital period (sidereal): 309 days
- Mean anomaly: 97.402°
- Mean motion: 1° 9^{m} 55.08^{s} / day
- Inclination: 20.026°
- Longitude of ascending node: 298.31°
- Argument of perihelion: 186.14°
- Earth MOID: 0.0001982 AU (0.0771 LD)

Physical characteristics
- Mean diameter: 35 m (est. at 0.24); 35–77 m (estimate); 76 m (est. at 0.05)
- Absolute magnitude (H): 24.5

2017 OO_{1} is a small asteroid, classified as a near-Earth object of the Aten group, approximately 35–76 meters (115–249 feet) in diameter. It was first observed on 23 July 2017, by the robotic ATLAS survey at Mauna Loa Observatory, Hawaii, two days after the object had approached Earth at 0.33 lunar distances on 21 July 2017.

== Orbit and classification ==
2017 OO_{1} is a member of the Aten asteroids, a subgroup of near-Earth objects that are located in the zone of influence of Venus. Atens are a much smaller group than the Apollo and Amor asteroids.

The object has an exceptionally low minimum orbital intersection distance with Earth of 29,650 kilometers or 0.077 lunar distances (LD). It orbits the Sun at a distance of 0.77–1.02 AU once every 10 months (309 days; semi-major axis of 0.89 AU). Its orbit has an eccentricity of 0.14 and an inclination of 20° with respect to the ecliptic. The body's observation arc begins with an observation made by the space-based Wide-field Infrared Survey Explorer on 22 July 2017, one day after its close flyby and a day before its official first observation.

== Close approaches ==
On 21 July 2017, at 03:32 UT, it flew past Earth at a nominal distance of 127,500 kilometers (0.33 LD) with a relative velocity of 10.36 km/s. All future encounters with Earth will occur at a significantly larger distance.

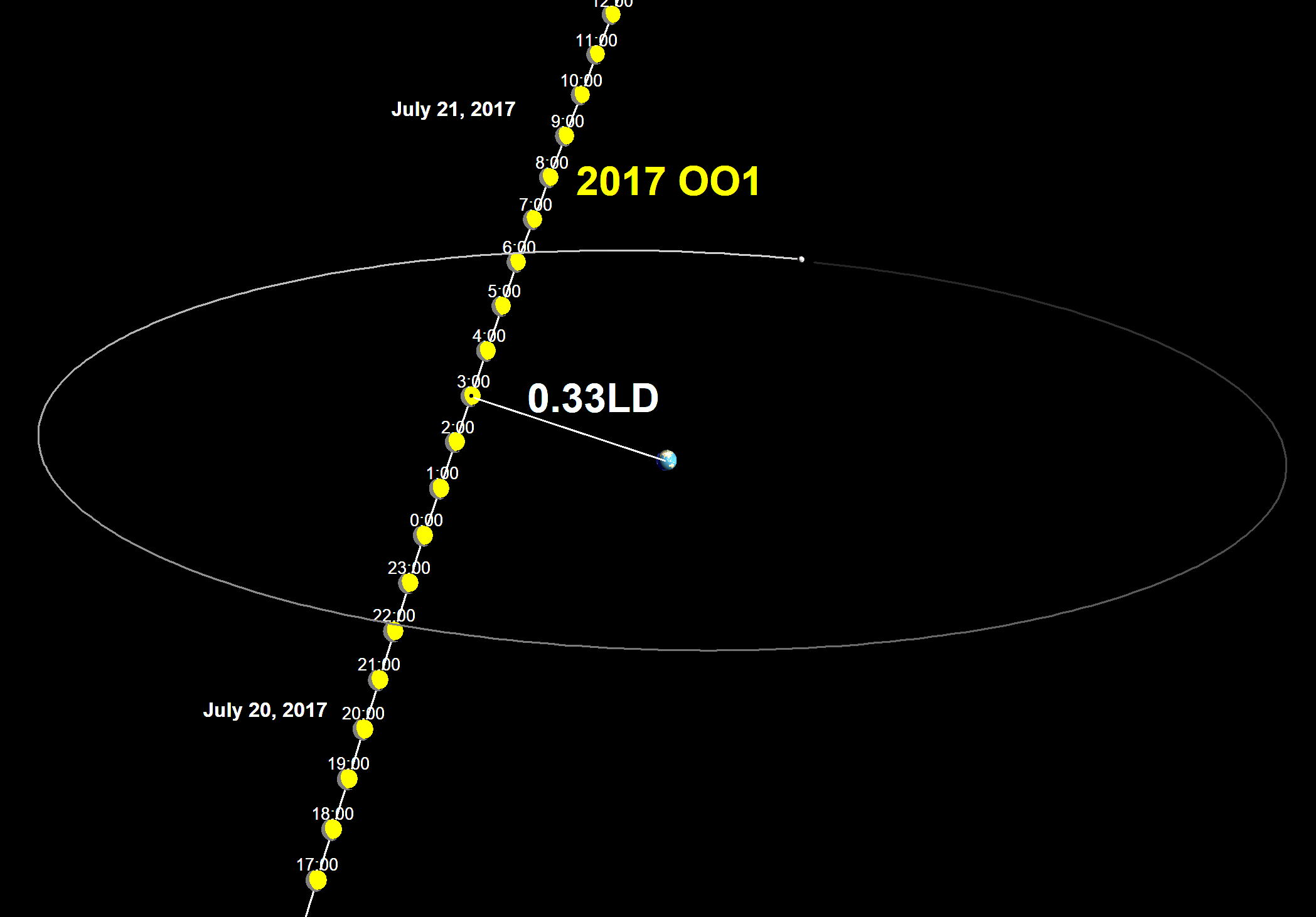
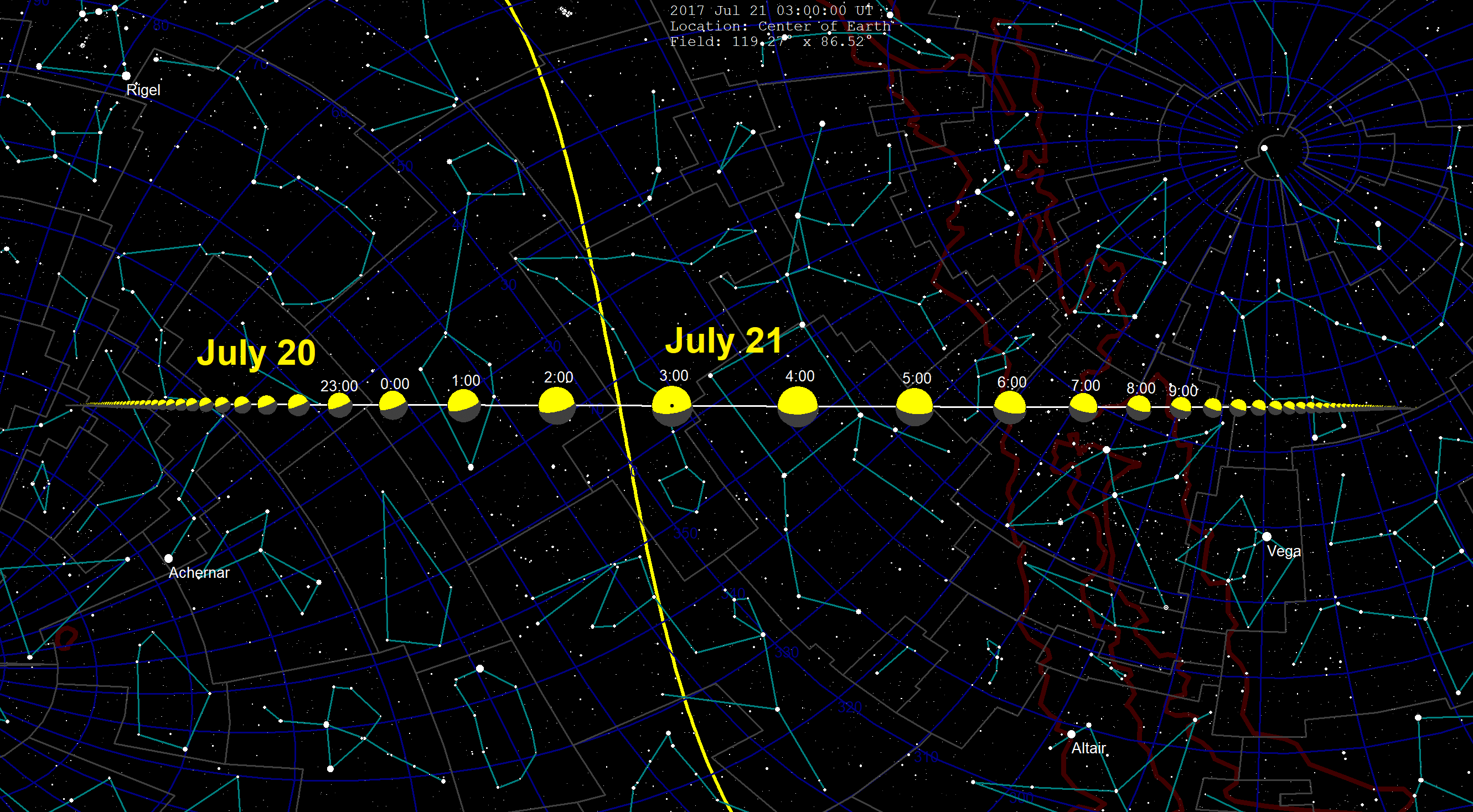
The objects trajectory inside the orbit of the Moon (left), and its path in the sky during flyby, seen from the center of the Earth

== Physical characteristics ==
Based on a generic magnitude-to-diameter conversion, 2017 OO_{1} measures between 35–76 meters (115–249 feet) in diameter, for an absolute magnitude of 24.5, and an assumed albedo between 0.05 and 0.24, which represent typical values for carbonaceous and stony asteroids, respectively. As of 2018, no rotational lightcurve has been obtained from photometric observations. The body's rotation period, pole and shape remain unknown.

== Numbering and naming ==
This minor planet has neither been numbered nor named by the Minor Planet Center.
