= 2012 TC4 =

Near-Earth micro-asteroid

2012 TC_{4}
- Radar movie of 2012 TC_{4}

Discovery
- Discovered by: Pan-STARRS 1
- Discovery site: Haleakala Obs.
- Discovery date: 4 October 2012

Designations
- Minor planet category: NEO; Apollo

Orbital characteristics
- Epoch 1 October 2017 (JD 2458027.5)
- Uncertainty parameter 1
- Observation arc: 5.19 yr (1,897 d)
- Aphelion: 1.8786 AU
- Perihelion: 0.9335 AU
- Semi-major axis: 1.4061 AU
- Eccentricity: 0.3361
- Orbital period (sidereal): 1.67 yr (609 d)
- Mean anomaly: 332.79°
- Mean motion: 0° 35^{m} 27.96^{s} / day
- Inclination: 0.8572°
- Longitude of ascending node: 198.23°
- Argument of perihelion: 222.58°
- Earth MOID: 0.000149 AU (0.0580 LD)
- Mars MOID: 0.03 AU

Physical characteristics
- Dimensions: 15 m × 8 m
- Mean diameter: 7–13 m 15 m
- Synodic rotation period: 0.2038 h (Note: Lightcurve plot of 2012 TC_{4} at the Palmer Divide Observatory by Brian D. Warner (2012). Rotation period 0.2038±0.0002 hours with a brightness amplitude of 0.93±0.05 mag. Summary figures for 2012 TC_{4} at the LCDB); 0.142 h; NPAR
- Geometric albedo: 0.35±0.1; 0.30±0.01 (radiometric)
- Spectral type: E/Xe; S (assumed); V–R = 0.41±0.02
- Apparent magnitude: 12.9–31
- Absolute magnitude (H): 26.7; 26.8

2012 TC_{4} is a tumbling micro-asteroid classified as a bright near-Earth object of the Apollo group, approximately 10 meters (30 feet) in diameter. It was first observed by Pan-STARRS at Haleakala Observatory on the Hawaiian island of Maui, in the United States. As of 1 October 2017, it had a small Earth minimum orbital intersection distance of 0.000149 AU (22,300 km). On 12 October 2017, it passed Earth at 0.00033524 AU (50,151 km). The asteroid was removed from the Sentry Risk Table on 16 October 2017 and with a 5-year observation arc has a well-known orbit. For example, on the previously risk-listed date of 12 October 2022, it is now known that the asteroid will be more than 3 AU (450 million km) from Earth.

== Approaches to large bodies ==
Orbital modeling shows the asteroid nominally passed about 1 million km from Earth in October 1986, but the uncertainty region suggests it could have passed as close as 20 km.

Date (UT)	Object	distance in km (center–center)	3-Σ uncertainty in km	Speed- relative in km/s
13 October 1996	Earth	753 000	± 7000	6.445
13 October 1996	Moon	530 000	± 6300	7.144
12 October 2012	Earth	94 965	± 0.32	7.123
12 October 2012	Moon	113 886	± 0.64	6.773
12 October 2017 – 05:42	Earth	50 151	± 0.14	7.647
12 October 2017 – 19:19	Moon	277 697	± 0.34	6.101

Data from JPL 60 solution date 3 November 2017

=== 2012 Earth encounter ===
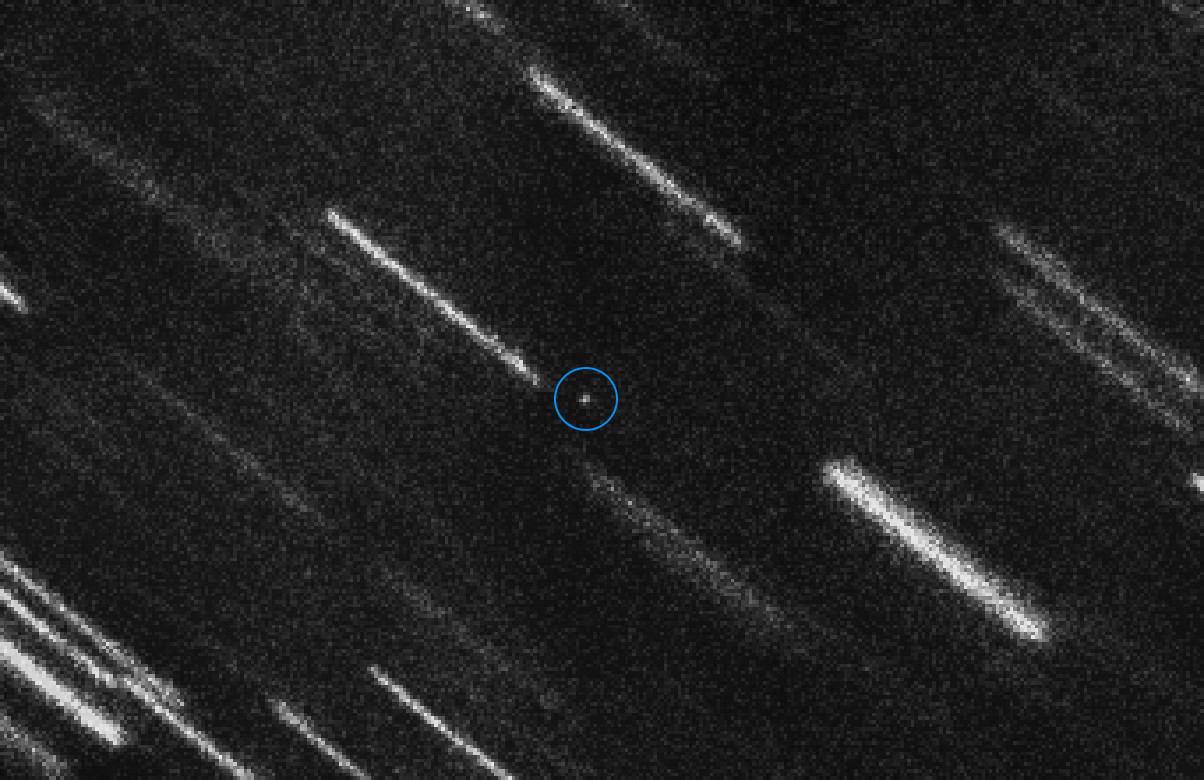
2012 TC_{4} appears as a dot of this composite of 37 individual 50-second exposures.

2012 TC_{4} was discovered on 4 October 2012 at apparent i-band magnitude 20.1 while the asteroid was 0.03 AU (4,500,000 km; 2,800,000 mi) from Earth. It came within 0.000634 AU (0.247 LD, 94,800 km, 58,900 mi) from Earth on 12 October 2012.

During the 2012 close approach, the asteroid only had an observation arc of 7 days, between 4 and 11 October 2012, so the exact distance of the 2017 closest approach was poorly constrained. With the 7 day observation arc, the asteroid had a 3-sigma chance of passing between 0.00008818 and 0.002896 AU (0.034 to 1.127 LD, 13,200–433,200 km, 8,200–269,200 mi) from Earth on 12 October 2017. Astronomers were certain that it would not pass closer than 6,800 km from the surface of Earth, ruling out any possibility that it could hit the Earth in 2017.

=== 2017 Earth encounter ===
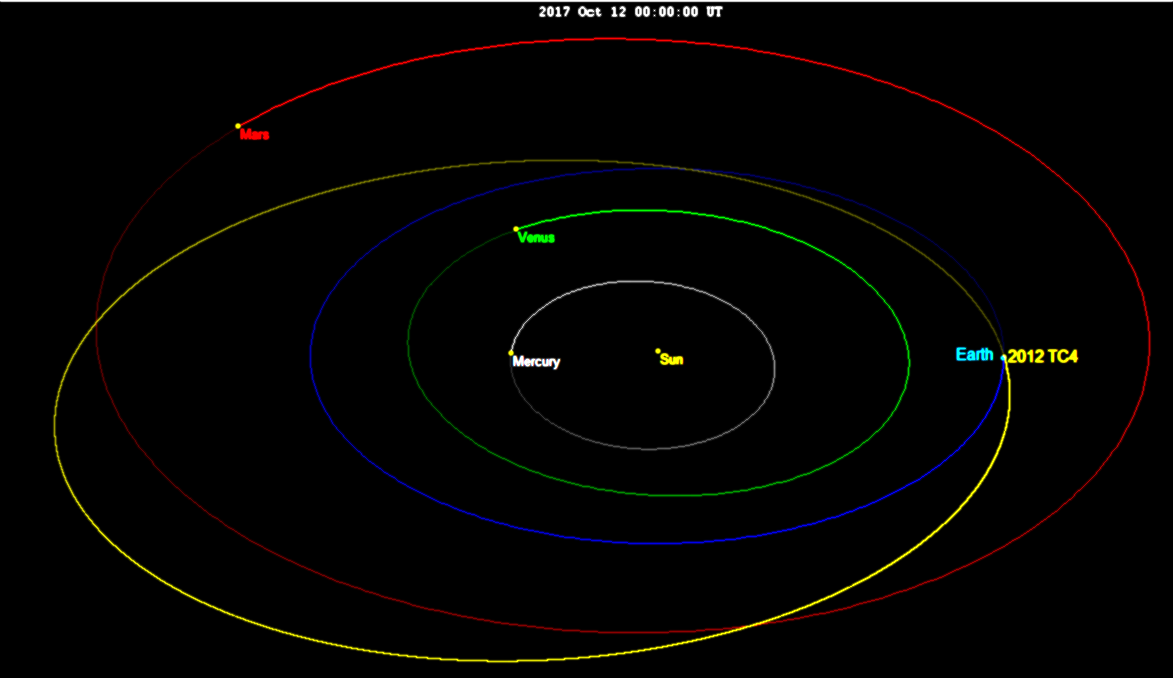
Orbit in yellow among inner solar system planets before 2017 flyby

Orbit of 2012 TC_{4} deflected by Earth's gravity. Earth is blue. For reference, a geosynchronous satellite and the Moon are included in this animation. The green path of 2012 TC_{4} turns darker as it dips below the ecliptic plane (click for animation).

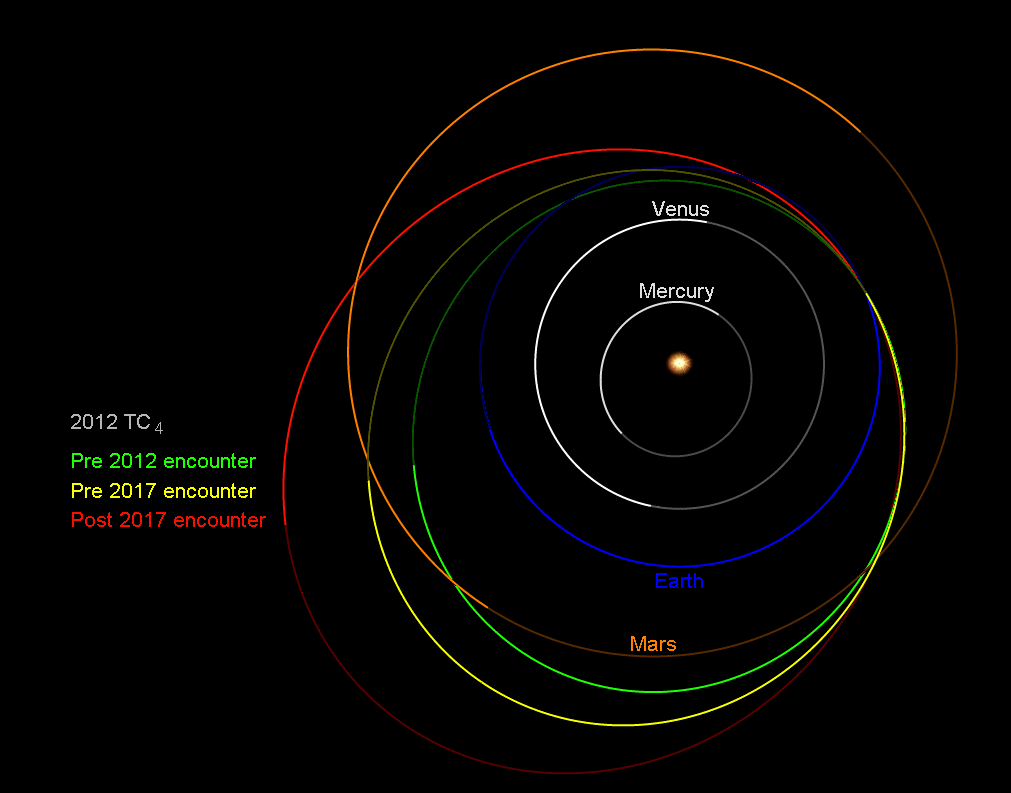
Orbits from pre-2012 to post-2017 encounters. The orbit of 2012 TC_{4} has changed twice since 2012.

On 12 October 2017 at 5:42 UT, the asteroid passed 0.00033524 AU (50,151 km; 31,163 mi) from Earth. Observations between July and October reduced the uncertainty region from several hundred thousand kilometers to about ±140 meters. The asteroid was removed from the Sentry Risk Table on 16 October 2017 using JPL solution #56. Prior to the encounter, it was rated −4.11 on the Palermo scale, with a 1 in 1,000 chance of impact over the next hundred years.

Paul Chodas of NASA's Center for near-Earth Object Studies, and Vishnu Reddy of the University of Arizona's Lunar and Planetary Laboratory, viewed the 2017 flyby (inside of the orbit of the Moon) as a way to test and refine the global asteroid detection and tracking network designed to give warning of objects heading toward Earth. Reddy coordinated the effort, involving over a dozen institutions worldwide. In addition to the observation campaign, NASA used this exercise to test communications between the many observers and also to test internal U.S. government messaging and communications up through the executive branch and across government agencies, as it would during an actual predicted impact emergency. Results of the campaign were published on 3 November 2017.

The asteroid remained too faint to be recovered with automated astronomical surveys until early September, but a more targeted observation with the Very Large Telescope recovered it on 27 July 2017 at apparent magnitude 26.8, while the asteroid was 0.4 AU (60,000,000 km; 37,000,000 mi) from Earth, making it one of the dimmest asteroid recoveries ever. As such, 2012 TC_{4} has become the first known asteroid ever to be observed passing less than 1 Lunar distance from Earth twice in a row. At the time of recovery the asteroid was about 100 million times fainter than what can be seen with the naked eye and 500 times fainter than when it was discovered in 2012. As a result of the 2017 recovery observations, it was known that on 12 October 2017 at 5:42 UT, the asteroid would pass 0.0003352 AU (50,150 km; 31,160 mi) from Earth. Then at 19:19 UT, the asteroid would pass 0.001856 AU (277,700 km; 172,500 mi) from the Moon. 2012 TC_{4} peaked at about apparent magnitude 12.9, and was too faint to be seen without a telescope. The Earth approach of 2017 increased the asteroid's orbital period from 1.67 years to 2.06 years.

2012 TC_{4} reached a maximum apparent magnitude of 12.9 just prior to its closest approach, soon after which it came too close to the Sun to be seen with telescopes. It was last observed on 14 December 2017 at an apparent magnitude of 25.

== Physical properties ==
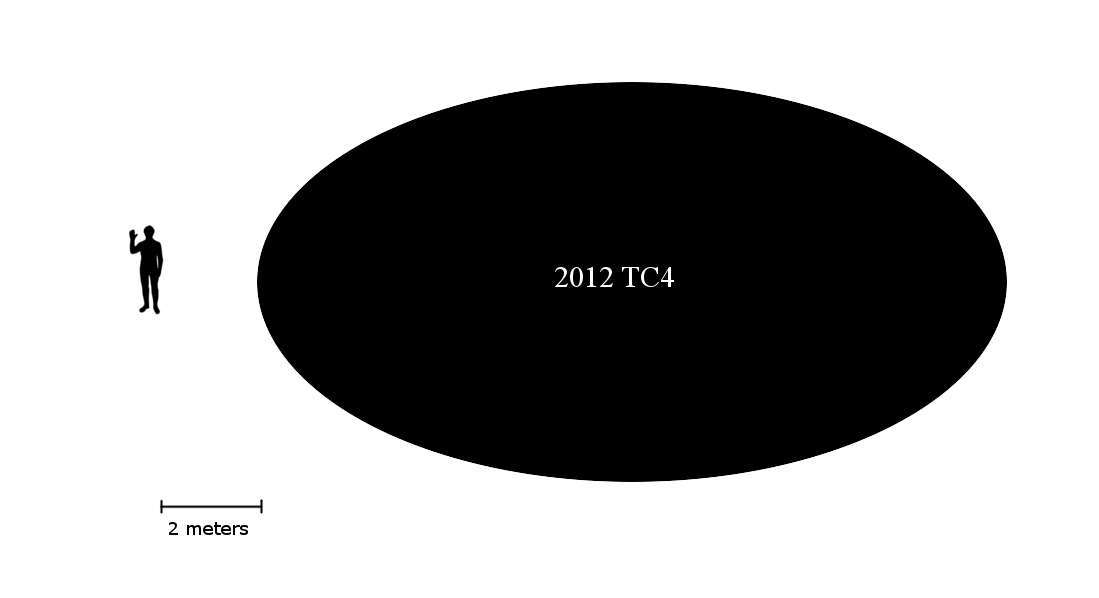
Size reference of 2012 TC_{4}, based on radar observations.

=== Fast rotator and tumbler ===
Studies of the asteroid's light curve in October 2012, found it to have a rotation period of 0.2038 hours (or 12 minutes and 14 seconds) with a brightness variation of 0.93 magnitude (U=3-), which is indicative for a non-spherical shape. 2012 TC_{4} is a fast rotator, which is rather typical for its small size. The fastest rotator currently known is 2014 RC, a similarly sized NEO, with a period of only 16 seconds. Lightcurves obtained during the 2017 encounter confirmed that 2012 TC_{4} is in a non-principal axis rotation, commonly known as tumbling. The spin axis varies on timescales of minutes, with a second period of 0.142 hours (or 8.5 minutes). The lightcurve amplitude suggests a ratio of largest to smallest axis of at least 2.3.

=== Radar observations ===
Radar images were taken from Goldstone Observatory and Green Bank Telescope on 12 October 2017. The delay-doppler images had a range resolution of 1.9 meters/pixel, the highest resolution ever obtained using Goldstone transmissions. The images showed that 2012 TC_{4} was a very elongated object about 50 feet (15 meters) long and roughly 25 feet (8 meters) wide. The high circular polarization ratio found for 2012 TC_{4} is consistent with results seen from E- and V-type NEAs previously. Observations from Arecibo Observatory were planned, but had to be cancelled due to damage to the observatory as a result of Hurricane Maria.

=== Composition ===
The spectrum of 2012 TC_{4} is that of an E- or Xe-type asteroid. E-type asteroids tend to have a high albedo (>0.30). This agrees with the albedo of 0.35 found for 2012 TC_{4}. This type of asteroids is commonly found in the inner Main Belt.

2012 TC_{4} is composed of igneous material. The short rotation period of 2012 TC_{4} implies that it is not a rubble pile but rather a monolithic object of non-negligible strength, which is typical for very small asteroids.

== Orbit change ==
As a result of 2012 TC_{4}'s frequent approaches to Earth, its orbit changes significantly over short periods of only decades. Its two observed close approaches and their effects are shown below:

Date	Event	Semimajor axis (AU)	Perihelion (AU)	Aphelion (AU)	Eccentricity	Inclination (°)	Argument of perihelion (°)	Ascending node (°)
2012-10-01	pre-2012 approach	1.2744	0.9015	1.6472	0.2926	1.4097	234.7282	198.5560
2012-10-12	2012 approach	1.3837	0.9115	1.8559	0.3413	1.2320	228.5354	198.4622
2012-10-30	post-2012 approach	1.3893	0.9305	1.8480	0.3302	0.8582	223.1271	198.1033
2017-10-01	pre-2017 approach	1.4155	0.9410	1.8901	0.3353	0.8566	221.8553	198.0054
2017-10-12	2017 approach	1.7076	0.9522	2.4630	0.4424	0.1693	218.4570	193.6520
2017-10-30	post-2017 approach	1.6492	0.9711	2.3273	0.4112	0.5327	248.6359	208.5051
2050-01-01	pre-2050 approach	1.6226	0.9688	2.2765	0.4030	0.5266	266.6192	197.8009

Between 2012 and 2017, 2012 TC_{4}'s average distance from the Sun increased by almost 0.4 AU, with the time it takes to orbit the sun increasing by 250 days. Its closest approach to the Sun also increased significantly, from 90% of the Earth's distance to the Sun to 97%, and its inclination lowered slightly, going from 1.4 degrees to less than 0.5 degrees relative to Earth's orbit.

As a result of non-gravitational forces such as the Yarkovsky effect on small bodies, it is difficult to constrain its orbit more than a few decades into the past or future.

== See also ==
- List of asteroid close approaches to Earth
- List of asteroid close approaches to Earth in 2012
- List of asteroid close approaches to Earth in 2017
- NASA Planetary Defense Coordination Office
