= List of asteroid close approaches to Earth in 2016 =

- Asteroids which came closer to Earth than the Moon in 2016 by time of discovery
- After closest approach: 31 (59.6%)
- < 24 hours before: 5 (9.6%)
- up to 7 days before: 16 (30.8%)
- > one week before: 0 (0.0%)
- > 7 weeks before: 0 (0.0%)
- > one year before: 0 (0.0%)
Other years

Below is the list of asteroid close approaches to Earth in 2016.

== Timeline of known close approaches less than one Lunar distance from Earth in 2016 ==
A list of known near-Earth asteroid close approaches less than 1 lunar distance (0.0025696 AU (384,410 km; 238,860 mi)) from Earth in 2016, based on the close approach database of the Center for Near-Earth Object Studies (CNEOS).

For reference, the radius of Earth is approximately 0.0000426 AU (6,370 km; 3,960 mi) or 0.0166 Lunar distances.
The orbit of geosynchronous satellites, however, is 0.000282 AU (42,200 km; 26,200 mi) or 0.110 Lunar distances. This year, 6 (possibly 7) asteroids traveled nearer than this, most notably 2016 DY_{30}, which approached a mere 1.25 Earth radii (8000 km) from the surface.

The CNEOS database of close approaches lists some close approaches a full orbit or more before the discovery of the object, derived by orbit calculation. The list below only includes close approaches that are evidenced by observations, thus the pre-discovery close approaches would only be included if the object was found by precovery, but there was no such close approach in 2016.

This list and relevant databases do not consider impacts as close approaches, thus this list does not include any of the 32 objects that collided with Earth's atmosphere in 2016, none of which were discovered in advance, but were observed visually or recorded by sensors designed to detect detonation of nuclear devices.

Rows highlighted red indicate objects which were not discovered until after closest approach

Rows highlighted yellow indicate objects discovered less than 24 hours before closest approach

Rows highlighted green indicate objects discovered more than one week before closest approach

Rows highlighted turquoise indicate objects discovered more than 7 weeks before closest approach

Rows highlighted blue indicate objects discovered more than one year before closest approach
(i.e. objects successfully cataloged on a previous orbit, rather than being detected during final approach)

Date of closest approach	Date discovered	Object	Nominal geocentric distance (AU) (Note: Distance from the center of Earth to the center of the object. See the NASA/JPL Solar System Dynamics Glossary: Geocentric. Earth has a radius of approximately 6,400 km.)	Nominal geocentric distance (LD)	Size (m) (approximate)	(H)	Closer approach to Moon
2016-01-10	2016-01-12	2016 AQ_{164}	0.000698 AU (104,400 km; 64,900 mi)	0.27	2.9–6.5	29.8	
2016-01-12	2016-01-13	2016 AH_{164}	0.000178 AU (26,600 km; 16,500 mi)	0.07	3.1–6.8	29.7	
2016-01-13	2016-01-14	2016 AN_{165}	0.00120 AU (180,000 km; 112,000 mi)	0.47	7.7–17	27.7	
2016-01-14	2016-01-14	2016 AN_{164}	0.000248 AU (37,100 km; 23,100 mi)	0.10	2.2–4.9	30.4	
2016-02-06	2016-02-03	2016 CG_{18}	0.00101 AU (151,000 km; 94,000 mi)	0.39	5.3–12	28.5	
2016-02-10	2016-02-11	2016 CW_{264}	0.00141 AU (211,000 km; 131,000 mi)	0.55	2.9–6.5	29.8	
2016-02-13	2016-02-12	2016 CM_{194}	0.000517 AU (77,300 km; 48,100 mi)	0.20	7.7–17	27.7	
2016-02-15	2016-02-16	2016 DB	0.000828 AU (123,900 km; 77,000 mi)	0.32	5.3–12	28.5	
2016-02-25	2016-02-26	2016 DY_{30}	0.0000956 AU (14,300 km; 8,890 mi)	0.04	2.1–4.7	30.5	
2016-02-26	2016-02-27	2016 DK_{2}	0.00212 AU (317,000 km; 197,000 mi)	0.83	4.4–9.9	28.9	
2016-02-29	2016-02-28	2016 DA_{31}	0.00134 AU (200,000 km; 125,000 mi)	0.52	2.8–6.2	29.9	Yes
2016-03-03	2016-03-02	2016 EK_{1}	0.00135 AU (202,000 km; 125,000 mi)	0.53	4–9	29.1	Yes
2016-03-04	2016-03-03	2016 EL_{1}	0.00154 AU (230,000 km; 143,000 mi)	0.60	7.3–16	27.8	
2016-03-08	2016-03-07	2016 EV_{28}	0.00103 AU (154,000 km; 96,000 mi)	0.40	5.4–15	28.5	
2016-03-10	2016-03-11	2016 EN_{157}	0.00216 AU (323,000 km; 201,000 mi)	0.84	6.7–15	28.0	
2016-03-11	2016-03-15	2016 EF_{195}	0.000211 AU (31,600 km; 19,600 mi)	0.08	21–47	25.5	
2016-03-14	2016-03-16	2016 FC_{1}	0.00112 AU (168,000 km; 104,000 mi)	0.44	4–9	29.1	
2016-03-23	2016-03-30	2016 FZ_{13}	0.00252 AU (377,000 km; 234,000 mi)	0.98	5.8–13	28.3	Yes
2016-03-25	2016-03-27	2016 FU_{6}	0.00120 AU (180,000 km; 112,000 mi)	0.47	4.4–9.9	28.9	
2016-03-28	2016-03-31	2016 FE_{15}	0.00180 AU (269,000 km; 167,000 mi)	0.70	4.6–10	28.8	Yes
2016-04-01	2016-04-05	2016 GS_{134}	0.00133 AU (199,000 km; 124,000 mi)	0.52	7.7–17	27.7	
2016-04-04	2016-04-05	2016 GN_{134}	0.000382 AU (57,100 km; 35,500 mi)	0.15	2.3–5.1	30.3	
2016-04-05	2016-03-30	2016 FW_{13}	0.00210 AU (314,000 km; 195,000 mi)	0.82	3.3–7.5	29.5	
2016-04-06	2016-04-09	2016 GO_{206}	0.00222 AU (332,000 km; 206,000 mi)	0.86	15–33	26.3	
2016-04-08	2016-04-06	2016 GO_{134}	0.00222 AU (332,000 km; 206,000 mi)	0.86	8–18	27.6	
2016-05-05	2016-05-03	2016 JS_{5}	0.00136 AU (203,000 km; 126,000 mi)	0.53	1.9–4.3	30.7	
2016-06-04	2016-06-10	2016 LR_{51}	0.00235 AU (352,000 km; 218,000 mi)	0.91	8.8–20	27.4	Yes
2016-06-07	2016-06-04	2016 LT_{1}	0.000965 AU (144,400 km; 89,700 mi)	0.38	4.2–9.4	29.0	
2016-06-09	2016-06-08	2016 LP_{10}	0.000479 AU (71,700 km; 44,500 mi)	0.19	3.7–8.2	29.3	
2016-07-07	2016-07-09	2016 NJ_{22}	0.00191 AU (286,000 km; 178,000 mi)	0.74	5.6–12	28.4	
2016-07-11	2016-07-09	2016 NK_{22}	0.00177 AU (265,000 km; 165,000 mi)	0.69	4.2–9.4	29.0	
2016-08-28	2016-08-27	2016 QA_{2}	0.000579 AU (86,600 km; 53,800 mi)	0.23	25–57	25.1	
2016-09-02	2016-09-04	2016 RR_{1}	0.000865 AU (129,400 km; 80,400 mi)	0.34	6.7–15	28.0	
2016-09-03	2016-09-04	2016 RS_{1}	0.00127 AU (190,000 km; 118,000 mi)	0.50	3.8–8.6	29.2	
2016-09-07	2016-09-05	2016 RB_{1}	0.000271 AU (40,500 km; 25,200 mi)	0.11	5.8–13	28.3	
2016-09-11	2016-09-11	2016 RN_{41}	0.000159 AU (23,800 km; 14,800 mi)	0.06	1.7–3.7	31.0	
2016-09-21	2016-09-22	2016 SJ	0.000997 AU (149,100 km; 92,700 mi)	0.39	4.2–9.4	29.0	
2016-09-24	2016-09-26	2016 SU_{2}	0.00235 AU (352,000 km; 218,000 mi)	0.91	8–18	27.6	
2016-09-25	2016-09-26	2016 SA_{2}	0.00205 AU (307,000 km; 191,000 mi)	0.80	6.3–14	28.1	
2016-09-30	2016-10-01	2016 TD	0.00151 AU (226,000 km; 140,000 mi)	0.59	6.4–14	28.1	
2016-10-03	2016-10-02	2016 TH	0.000858 AU (128,400 km; 79,800 mi)	0.33	3.5–7.8	29.4	
2016-10-08	2016-10-09	2016 TG_{94}	0.00145 AU (217,000 km; 135,000 mi)	0.56	3.1–7	29.7	
2016-10-10	2016-10-11	2016 TS_{54}	0.000502 AU (75,100 km; 46,700 mi)	0.20	7.3–16	27.8	
2016-10-11	2016-10-09	2016 TB_{19}	0.00212 AU (317,000 km; 197,000 mi)	0.82	4–9	29.1	
2016-10-17	2016-10-19	2016 UD	0.000485 AU (72,600 km; 45,100 mi)	0.19	13–28	26.6	
2016-11-02	2016-11-01	2016 VA	0.000630 AU (94,200 km; 58,600 mi)	0.25	8–18	27.6	
2016-11-07	2016-11-05	2016 VB_{1}	0.00179 AU (268,000 km; 166,000 mi)	0.70	5.1–11	28.6	
2016-11-10	2016-11-11	2016 VF_{18}	0.000467 AU (69,900 km; 43,400 mi)	0.18	2.8–6.3	29.9	
2016-11-17	2016-11-18	2016 WT	0.00129 AU (193,000 km; 120,000 mi)	0.50	2.9–6.5	29.8	
2016-11-21	2016-11-23	2016 WT_{3}	0.00243 AU (364,000 km; 226,000 mi)	0.95	5.1–11	28.6	
2016-11-25	2016-11-24	2016 WW_{2}	0.000894 AU (133,700 km; 83,100 mi)	0.35	5.1–9.2	29.0	
2016-11-30	2016-12-01	2016 XL_{23}	0.000580 AU (86,800 km; 53,900 mi)	0.23	3.7–8.3	29.3	

In addition to the confirmed asteroids on the above list, which feature in the CNEOS close approach database, there have been well-observed unconfirmed or confirmed but poorly observed objects with a 50% or greater chance of passing within 1 LD of the Earth, which are listed separately below.

Date of closest approach	Date discovered	Object	Nominal geocentric distance (AU)	Nominal geocentric distance (LD)	Size (m) (approximate)	(H)	Closer approach to Moon
2016-02-11	2016-??-??	P10tI8h	0.00176 AU (263,000 km; 164,000 mi)	0.69	2–3	30.7	?
2016-03-28	2016-03-31	2016 FR_{60} aka BeUc1Ig	0.00256 AU (383,000 km; 238,000 mi)	0.99	3–9	29.3	?
2016-04-01	2016-04-02	2016 GC_{252} aka XGB1CE8	0.000336 AU (50,300 km; 31,200 mi)	0.13	3–9	29.3	?
2016-08-09	2016-08-16 (Unconfirmed)	DT16P09	0.000432 AU (64,600 km; 40,200 mi)	0.17	1–3	32.9	?
2016-10-14	2016-10-20 (Unconfirmed)	XT9D939	0.00241 AU (361,000 km; 224,000 mi)	0.94 (Note: distance error: 0.000244 AU, approach range: 0.84 to 1.03 LD)	7–20	27.7	
2016-10-19	2016-11-06 (Unconfirmed)	XUA7AB3	0.00233 AU (349,000 km; 217,000 mi)	0.91 (Note: distance error: 0.000609 AU, approach range: 0.67 to 1.14 LD)	4–13	28.6	
2016-11-05	2016-11-14 (Unconfirmed)	XV88D4F	0.000245 AU (36,700 km; 22,800 mi)	0.095 (Note: distance error: 0.0000808 AU, approach range: 0.064 to 0.13 LD)	2–7	30.0	

=== Warning times by size ===
This sub-section visualizes the warning times of the close approaches listed in the table of confirmed close approaches, depending on the size of the asteroid. The sizes of the charts show the relative sizes of the asteroids to scale. For comparison, the approximate size of a person is also shown. This is based the absolute magnitude of each asteroid, an approximate measure of size based on brightness.

Absolute magnitude H ≥ 30 (smallest)

Silhouette of man standing and facing forward

(size of a person for comparison)

Absolute magnitude 30 > H ≥ 29

Absolute magnitude 29 > H ≥ 28

Absolute magnitude 28 > H ≥ 27

Absolute magnitude 27 > H ≥ 26

Absolute magnitude 26 > H ≥ 25

- After closest approach: 1 (50.0%)
- < 24 hours before: 1 (50.0%)
- up to 7 days before: 0 (0.0%)
- > one week before: 0 (0.0%)
- > 7 weeks before: 0 (0.0%)
- > one year before: 0 (0.0%)

Absolute magnitude 25 > H (largest)

None

== Timeline of close approaches less than one Lunar distance from the Moon in 2016 ==
The number of asteroids listed here are significantly less than those of asteroids that approach Earth for several reasons. Asteroids that approach Earth not only move faster, but are brighter and are easier to detect with modern surveys because:

- Asteroids that come closer to Earth are a higher priority to confirm, and only confirmed asteroids are listed with a lunocentric approach distance.
- Those that closely approach the Moon are frequently lost in its glare, making them harder to confirm. They are easier to discover during the new Moon, when the Moon is too close to the Sun to detect asteroids while they are near the Moon.

These factors severely limit the amount of Moon-approaching asteroids, to a level many times lower than the asteroids detected passing as close to Earth.

Date of closest approach	Object	Nominal lunocentric distance (AU) (Note: Distance from the center of the Moon to the center of the object. the Moon has a radius of approximately 1,740 km.)	Nominal lunocentric distance (LD)	Size (m) (approximate)	(H)	approach distance to Earth (LD)
2016-01-01	2016 AN_{66}	0.00214 AU (320,000 km; 199,000 mi)	0.83	7–24	27.3	1.45
2016-01-10	2016 AQ_{164}	0.00125 AU (187,000 km; 116,000 mi)	0.49	2–7	29.9	0.27
2016-01-11	2016 AH_{164}	0.000632 AU (94,500 km; 58,700 mi)	0.25	3–7	29.7	0.069
2016-02-07	2016 CG_{18}	0.00141 AU (211,000 km; 131,000 mi)	0.55	3–16	28.5	0.39
2016-02-10	2016 CW_{264}	0.00195 AU (292,000 km; 181,000 mi)	0.76	2–7	29.8	0.56
2016-02-13	2016 CM_{194}	0.00204 AU (305,000 km; 190,000 mi)	0.79	7–21	27.5	0.20
2016-02-26	2016 DY_{30}	0.00189 AU (283,000 km; 176,000 mi)	0.74	2–5	30.5	0.037
2016-02-29	2016 DA_{31}	0.00127 AU (190,000 km; 118,000 mi)	0.49	2–7	29.9	0.52
2016-03-03	2016 EK_{1}	0.00100 AU (150,000 km; 93,000 mi)	0.39	2–9	29.1	0.53
2016-03-04	2016 EL_{1}	0.00158 AU (236,000 km; 147,000 mi)	0.61	5–20	27.8	0.60
2016-03-05	2016 EG_{1}	0.00256 AU (383,000 km; 238,000 mi)	0.998	3–10	29.1	1.14
2016-03-08	2016 EV_{28}	0.00116 AU (174,000 km; 108,000 mi)	0.45	4–10	28.5	0.40
2016-03-09	2016 EN_{157}	0.00228 AU (341,000 km; 212,000 mi)	0.89	5–9	28.0	0.84
2016-03-10	2016 EF_{195}	0.00160 AU (239,000 km; 149,000 mi)	0.62	16–31	25.5	0.082
2016-03-14	2016 FC_{1}	0.00131 AU (196,000 km; 122,000 mi)	0.51	4–8	29.1	0.44
2016-03-21	2016 FN_{56}	0.00256 AU (383,000 km; 238,000 mi)	0.995 (Note: For the Moon, the exact approach distance for 2016 FN_{56} is in high error, but with a higher certainty than to Earth: The error is slightly higher at 0.000208 AU, but as the approach distance is 0.0045 LD closer, the likelihood of a less-than-1-LD approach is nearly 0.6% higher.)	35–86	24.2	0.9995
2016-03-24	2016 FZ_{13}	0.000942 AU (140,900 km; 87,600 mi)	0.37	4–10	28.3	0.98
2016-03-26	2016 FU_{6}	0.00213 AU (319,000 km; 198,000 mi)	0.83	4–9	28.9	0.47
2016-03-28	2016 FE_{15}	0.00124 AU (186,000 km; 115,000 mi)	0.48	4–12	28.8	0.70
2016-04-03	2016 FB_{13}	0.00232 AU (347,000 km; 216,000 mi)	0.90	10–31	26.7	1.23
2016-04-04	2016 GN_{134}	0.00220 AU (329,000 km; 205,000 mi)	0.86	1–5	30.3	0.19
2016-04-11	2016 FV_{13}	0.00232 AU (347,000 km; 216,000 mi)	0.90	13–43	26.0	1.81
2016-05-06	2016 JS_{5}	0.00160 AU (239,000 km; 149,000 mi)	0.62	1–5	30.6	0.53
2016-06-04	2016 LR_{51}	0.00215 AU (322,000 km; 200,000 mi)	0.84	7–24	27.4	0.91
2016-06-09	2016 LP_{10}	0.00204 AU (305,000 km; 190,000 mi)	0.80	2–8	29.5	0.20
2016-09-02	2016 RS_{1}	0.00242 AU (362,000 km; 225,000 mi)	0.94	3–11	29.1	0.50
2016-09-07	2016 RK_{40}	0.00128 AU (191,000 km; 119,000 mi)	0.50	5–28	27.4	1.35
2016-09-08	2016 RB_{1}	0.00192 AU (287,000 km; 178,000 mi)	0.75	6–18	27.8	0.11
2016-09-10	2016 SF_{1}	0.00156 AU (233,000 km; 145,000 mi)	0.61	24–80	24.6	1.32
2016-09-10	2016 RE_{34}	0.00217 AU (325,000 km; 202,000 mi)	0.84	5–15	28.3	1.19
2016-10-03	2016 TH	0.000908 AU (135,800 km; 84,400 mi)	0.35	3–9	29.4	0.33
2016-10-07	2016 TG_{94}	0.00179 AU (268,000 km; 166,000 mi)	0.70	3–8	29.7	0.56
2016-10-10	2016 TS_{54}	0.00210 AU (314,000 km; 195,000 mi)	0.82	6–18	27.9	0.20
2016-10-18	2016 UD	0.00107 AU (160,000 km; 99,000 mi)	0.42	10–33	26.6	0.19
2016-11-02	2016 VA	0.00229 AU (343,000 km; 213,000 mi)	0.89	6–27	27.3	0.24
2016-11-05	XV88D4F	0.00251 AU (375,000 km; 233,000 mi)	0.98	2–7	30.0	0.095
2016-11-08	2016 VB_{1}	0.00232 AU (347,000 km; 216,000 mi)	0.90	4–15	28.4	0.70
2016-11-10	2016 VF_{18}	0.00220 AU (329,000 km; 205,000 mi)	0.85	2–8	29.9	0.18
2016-11-17	2016 WY	0.00242 AU (362,000 km; 225,000 mi)	0.94	3–10	29.3	1.73
2016-11-17	2016 WT	0.00229 AU (343,000 km; 213,000 mi)	0.89	2–8	29.7	0.50
2016-11-25	2016 WW_{2}	0.000997 AU (149,100 km; 92,700 mi)	0.39	3–11	29.0	0.35
2016-11-27	2016 WR_{55}	0.00255 AU (381,000 km; 237,000 mi)	0.991	5–15	28.3	1.13
2016-11-30	2016 XL_{23}	0.00169 AU (253,000 km; 157,000 mi)	0.66	3–10	29.3	0.23

== Additional examples ==
An example list of near-Earth asteroids that passed more than 1 lunar distance (384,400 km or 0.00256 AU) from Earth in 2016.

- 2015 YC_{2} (~102 meters in diameter) passed 4.92 Lunar distances (1.9 million km) from Earth on 15 January 2016.
- XBBE860 (~8 meters in diameter) passed 1.13 lunar distances (435,000 km) from Earth on 1 February 2016.
- P10tc2W (~10 meters in diameter) passed 1.02 lunar distances (391,000 km) from Earth on 6 March 2016
- 2013 TX68 (~30 meters in diameter) may have passed as close as 0.07 lunar distances (30,000 km) from Earth around 5–6 March 2016, but the best fitting orbital solution suggests that it passed roughly 11 lunar distances (4 million km) from Earth around 8 March 2016. 2013 TX68 has not been observed since 2013 and was not recovered during the 2016 passage.
- 252P/LINEAR (~900 meters in diameter) passed 13.9 lunar distances (5.3 million km) from Earth on 21 March 2016
- Comet P/2016 BA14 (~1000 meters in diameter) passed 9.2 lunar distances (3.5 million km) from Earth on 22 March 2016.
- 2014 JG_{55} (~6 meters in diameter) has a minimum estimated approach on May 8, 2016 of 0.82 lunar distances (315,000 km) from Earth. However the best fit calculates an approach of 7.6 lunar distances (2.9 million km) from Earth.
- 2009 DL_{46} (~200 meters in diameter) passed 6.2 lunar distances (2.4 million km) from Earth on May 24, 2016.
- 2016 FE_{13} (~23 meters in diameter) passed 27.98 lunar distances (10.7 million km) from Earth on March 26, 2016
- 2016 PQ (~30 meters in diameter) passed 9.80 lunar distances (3.8 million km) from Earth on August 7, 2016.
- 2016 SW_{3} (~8 meters in diameter) passed between 1.0012 and 1.0029 lunar distances (385,000 km) from Earth on September 26, 2016.
- 2016 UQ_{36} (~11 meters in diameter) passed 1.033 lunar distances (397,000 km) from Earth on October 24, 2016
- 2017 AG_{5} (~108 meters in diameter) passed 4.6 Lunar distances (1.75 million km) from Earth on 30 December 2016

== Other objects ==
XF38FAC (Satellite 2015-007B) with an observation arc of only 17 minutes was estimated to have a chance of impacting Earth at 16:51 on 20 March 2016, but turned out to be the SpaceX Falcon 9 second stage that sent Deep Space Climate Observatory out to L1.

== See also ==
- List of asteroid close approaches to Earth
- List of asteroid close approaches to Earth in 2015
- List of asteroid close approaches to Earth in 2017
