= 2013 TX68 =

Apollo asteroid and near-Earth object

2013 TX_{68}
Discovery
- Discovered by: Catalina Sky Survey (703)
- Discovery date: 6 October 2013

Designations
- Minor planet category: NEO; Apollo; Venus-crossing asteroid; Mars-crossing asteroid

Orbital characteristics
- Epoch 5 October 2013 (JD 2456570.5)
- Uncertainty parameter 8
- Observation arc: 10 days (last seen 2013)
- Aphelion: 2.5730 AU (384.92 Gm)
- Perihelion: 0.74447 AU (111.371 Gm)
- Semi-major axis: 1.6587 AU (248.14 Gm)
- Eccentricity: 0.55118
- Orbital period (sidereal): 2.14 yr (780.31 d)
- Mean anomaly: 334.34°
- Mean motion: 0° 27^{m} 40.86^{s} / day
- Inclination: 1.1092°
- Longitude of ascending node: 165.741°
- Argument of perihelion: 286.977°
- Earth MOID: 1.70448×10^{−5} AU (2.54987×10^{3} km)
- Mercury MOID: 0.43841
- Venus MOID: 0.03407 AU
- Mars MOID: 0.00715
- Jupiter MOID: 2.66285 AU (398.357 Gm)

Physical characteristics
- Dimensions: 21-52 meters (69–171 ft)
- Absolute magnitude (H): 25.2

2013 TX_{68} is an Apollo asteroid and near-Earth object discovered on 6 October 2013 by the Catalina Sky Survey, during which it was near a close approach of 5.4 Lunar distances (LD) from the Earth. (Note: The time of closest approach for the 2013 pass is known with an accuracy of better than 1 minute.) The asteroid only has a 10-day observation arc which makes long-term predictions of its position less certain. It was observed for three days as it approached Earth in the night sky starting with the sixth of October, 2013. Then it became unobservable by being between the Earth and the Sun, then not recovered due to its small size and dimness. Precovery images by Pan-STARRS from 29 September 2013 were announced on 11 February 2016 that extended the observation arc to 10 days. It was removed from the Sentry Risk Table on 11 February 2016, so there is no risk of impact from this object for the next hundred years or more. The asteroid was last observed on 9 October 2013.

== 2016 approach ==
The asteroid has a poorly constrained orbit, has not been observed since 2013, and often makes approaches to Earth. One such approach occurred sometime from 6 to 10 March 2016 with an uncertainty in the time of closest approach of ±2 days. While the nominal (best-fit) orbit suggested that it would pass 0.03 AU (4,500,000 km; 2,800,000 mi) from the Earth on March 8, it was calculated to pass as close as 0.0002 AU (30,000 km; 19,000 mi) (0.07 LD) or as far away as 0.1 AU (15,000,000 km; 9,300,000 mi). There was no risk of an Earth impact in 2016. JPL's graphic representation of 2013 TX_{68}'s orbit showed it was approaching Earth from the sunward side for an approach near the eighth of March with a chance of being detected by telescopes as it flew by. It was not expected to be more than 100 degrees from the Sun until March 9 and was expected to have an apparent magnitude of roughly 20.3. The asteroid was not recovered during the 2016 approach. During the March 2016 passage the uncertainty region for the asteroid covered as much as a 45 degree region of the sky.

== Possible impacts ==
2013 TX_{68} was listed on the Sentry Risk Table. The asteroid is 21–52 meters (69–171 ft) across, making it approximately twice as large as the Chelyabinsk meteor. However, it is not listed as a potentially hazardous asteroid because it is less than 100 meters (330 ft) in diameter. With an insignificant 1-day observation arc, it was listed on the Sentry Risk Table with a 1 in 20 million chance it could impact Earth on 5 March 2016, but that threat was quickly ruled out. With a short 3-day observation arc, it was listed on the Sentry Risk Table with a 1 in 300 million chance it could impact Earth on 28 September 2017. The nominal (best-fit) solution shows that 2013 TX_{68} should be around 1.5 AU from Earth on 28 September 2017. It was removed from the Sentry Risk Table on 11 February 2016 when precovery images gave it a 10-day observation arc.

If it were ever to impact Earth, it would likely create a large fireball in the sky and possibly an impact crater 100–575 meters (328–1,886 ft) across, assuming an impact angle of less than 45 degrees.

== See also ==
- 2009 RR
- List of asteroid close approaches to Earth in 2016
