= 2017 VL2 =

Near-Earth micro-asteroid

2017 VL_{2}
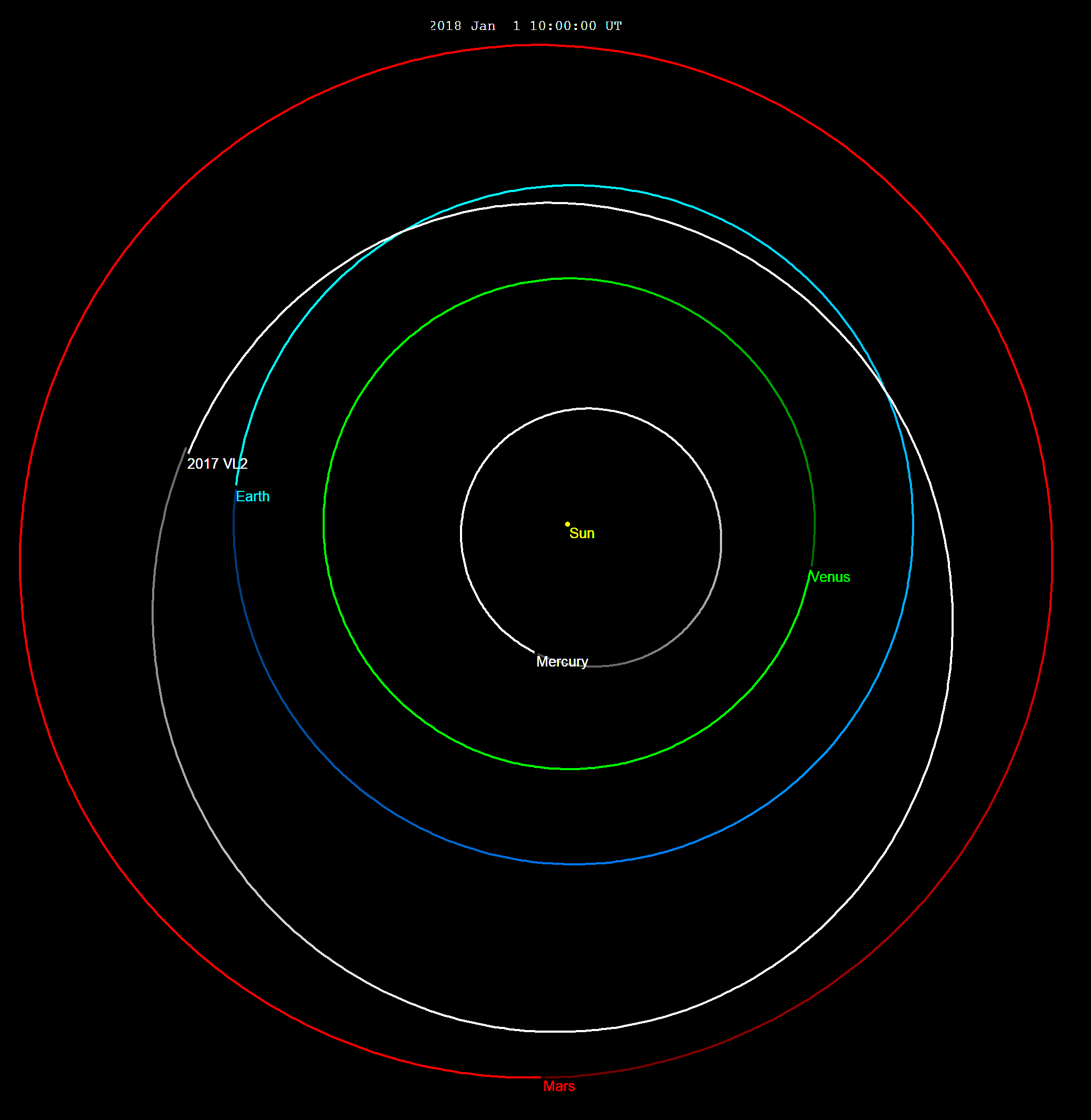
- The orbit of 2017 VL_{2} and positions on 1 January 2018

Discovery
- Discovered by: ATLAS
- Discovery site: Mauna Loa Obs.
- Discovery date: 10 November 2017

Designations
- Minor planet category: NEO · Apollo

Orbital characteristics
- Epoch 4 September 2017 (JD 2458000.5)
- Uncertainty parameter 7
- Observation arc: (16 days)
- Aphelion: 1.5139 AU
- Perihelion: 0.9466 AU
- Semi-major axis: 1.2303 AU
- Eccentricity: 0.2306
- Orbital period (sidereal): 1.36 yr (498 days)
- Mean anomaly: 337.43°
- Mean motion: 0° 43^{m} 20.28^{s} / day
- Inclination: 12.091°
- Longitude of ascending node: 227.05°
- Argument of perihelion: 139.41°
- Earth MOID: 0.0012 AU (0.5 LD)

Physical characteristics
- Mean diameter: 18 m (est. at 0.20); 6–32 m (estimate)
- Absolute magnitude (H): 26.079

2017 VL_{2} is a micro-asteroid, classified as a near-Earth object of the Apollo group. It was first observed by ATLAS at Mauna Loa Observatory on 10 November 2017, a day after it passed inside the orbit of Earth.

== Orbit and classification ==
2017 VL_{2} is an Apollo asteroid, the largest subgroup of near-Earth objects. It orbits the Sun at a distance of 0.9–1.5 AU once every 16 months (498 days; semi-major axis of 1.23 AU). Its orbit has an eccentricity of 0.23 and an inclination of 12° with respect to the ecliptic. It is, however, not a Mars-crossing asteroid, as its aphelion of 1.51 AU is less than the orbit of the Red Planet at 1.666 AU.

=== Close approaches ===
The object has a minimum orbital intersection distance with Earth of 180,000 km (0.0012 AU), which corresponds to 0.5 lunar distances. On 9 November 2017, it came within 0.31 lunar distances of the Earth (see diagrams).

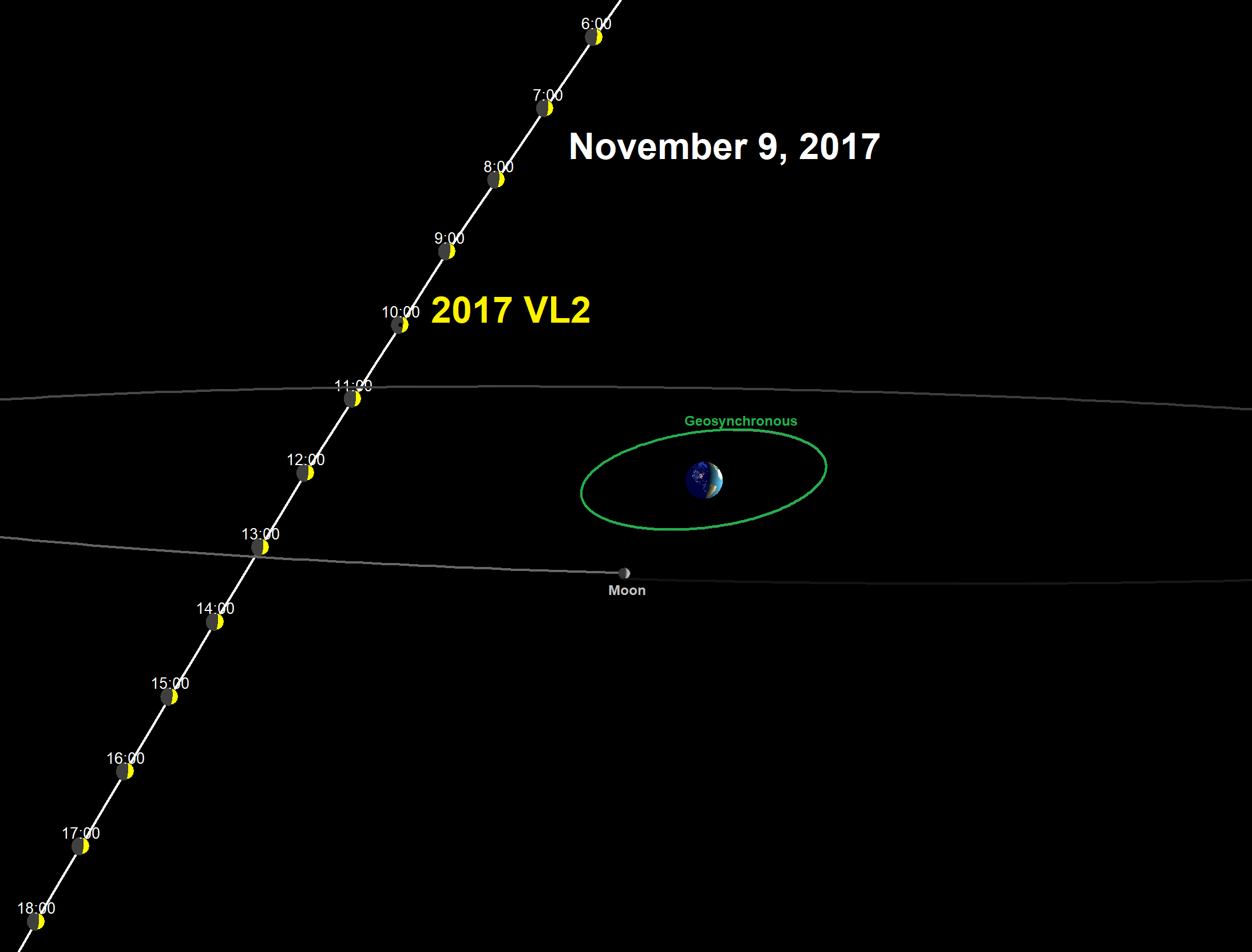
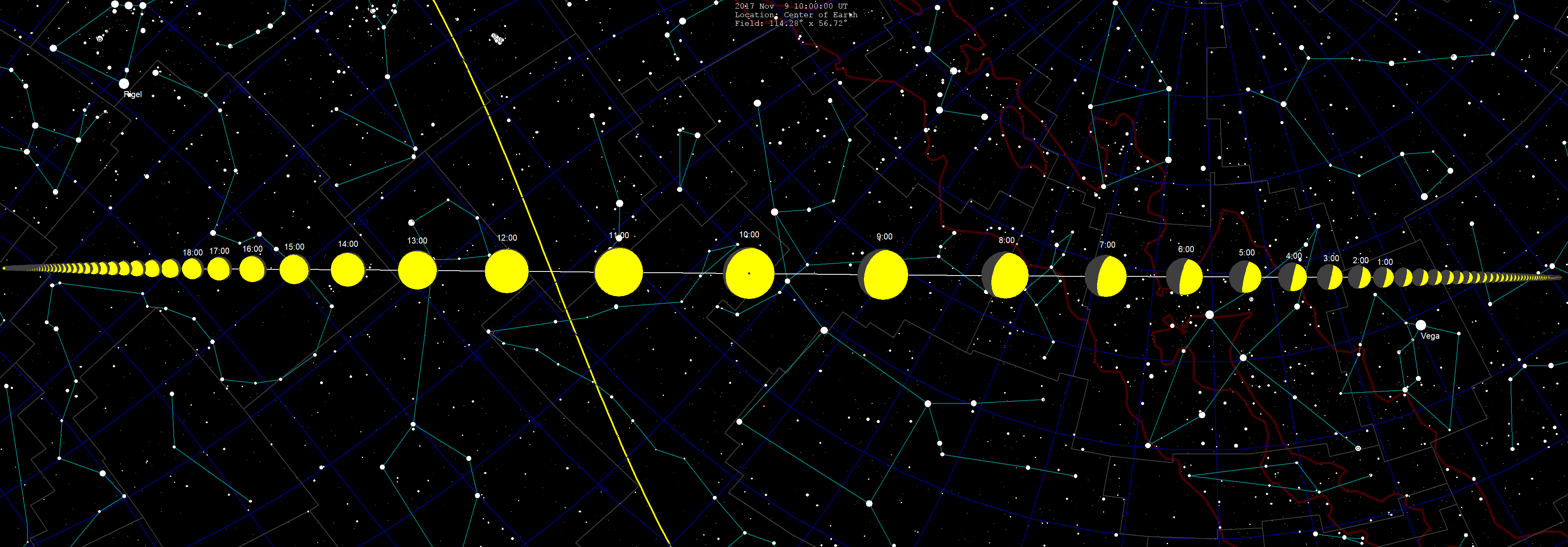
Path of 2017 VL_{2} as it passed inside Earth's orbit on 9 November 2017 (left). The object's path in the sky with 1 hour of motion on 9 November 2017 (right).

== Physical characteristics ==
2017 VL_{2} has been estimated to measure between 6 and 32 meters in diameter, comparable to the Chelyabinsk meteor, which was also not observed before it hit the atmosphere over Russia in 2013. For an assumed albedo of 0.20, which is typical for the common S-type asteroids, 2017 VL_{2}'s diameter would be likely 18 meters only. The size of asteroid 2017 VL2 has been described as that of a whale.

As of 2018, no rotational lightcurve of this asteroid has been obtained from photometric observations. The object's rotation period, pole and shape remain unknown.

== Numbering and naming ==
This minor planet has not yet been numbered by the Minor Planet Center and remains unnamed.
