= 2017 BQ6 =

Asteroid

2017 BQ_{6}
- Radar image of 2017 BQ_{6}

Discovery
- Discovered by: Space Surveillance Telescope
- Discovery site: Lincoln Lab's ETS
- Discovery date: 26 January 2017

Designations
- Alternative designations: E2017-C83
- Minor planet category: NEO · Apollo · PHA

Orbital characteristics
- Epoch 4 September 2017 (JD 2458000.5)
- Uncertainty parameter 3
- Observation arc: 130 days
- Aphelion: 2.9802 AU
- Perihelion: 0.9133 AU
- Semi-major axis: 1.9468 AU
- Eccentricity: 0.5309
- Orbital period (sidereal): 2.72 yr (992 days)
- Mean anomaly: 65.132°
- Mean motion: 0° 21^{m} 46.08^{s} / day
- Inclination: 9.0020°
- Longitude of ascending node: 133.03°
- Argument of perihelion: 43.562°
- Earth MOID: 0.0132 AU (5.1 LD)

Physical characteristics
- Dimensions: 0.120±0.027 km
- Synodic rotation period: 2.150 h 3 h
- Geometric albedo: 0.13+0.103 −0.057
- Spectral type: S (assumed)
- Absolute magnitude (H): 21.4

2017 BQ_{6} is a sub-kilometer asteroid on an eccentric orbit, classified as a near-Earth object and potentially hazardous asteroid of the Apollo group, approximately 150 meters in diameter. It was discovered on 26 January 2017, by the Space Surveillance Telescope at Lincoln Laboratory's ETS (Atom Site) and passed within 6.6 lunar distances of Earth on 7 February 2017 at 6:36 UT.

== Radar imaging ==
Its closest approach was observed by NASA's Goldstone Solar System Radar in California's Mojave Desert, determining it to have a number of angular flat surfaces similar to a polyhedral die.

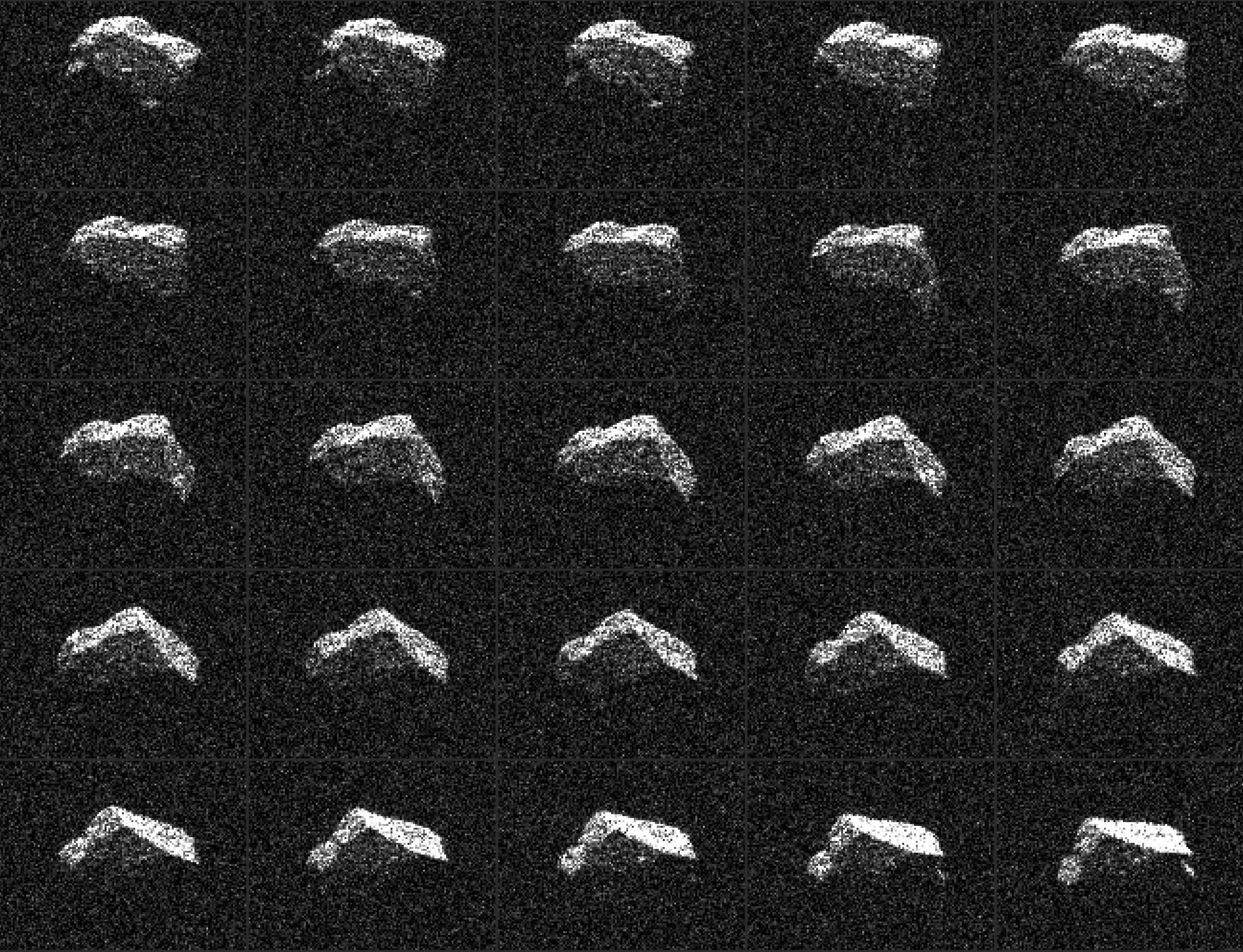
Goldstone radar images of 2017 BQ_{6}

== Orbit ==
2017 BQ_{6} orbits the Sun with a semi-major axis of 1.95 AU at a distance of 0.9–3.0 AU once every 2 years and 9 months (992 days). Its orbit has an eccentricity of 0.53 and an inclination of 9° with respect to the ecliptic. It has an Earth minimum orbital intersection distance of 0.0132 AU (1,970,000 km), which corresponds to 5.1 lunar distances.

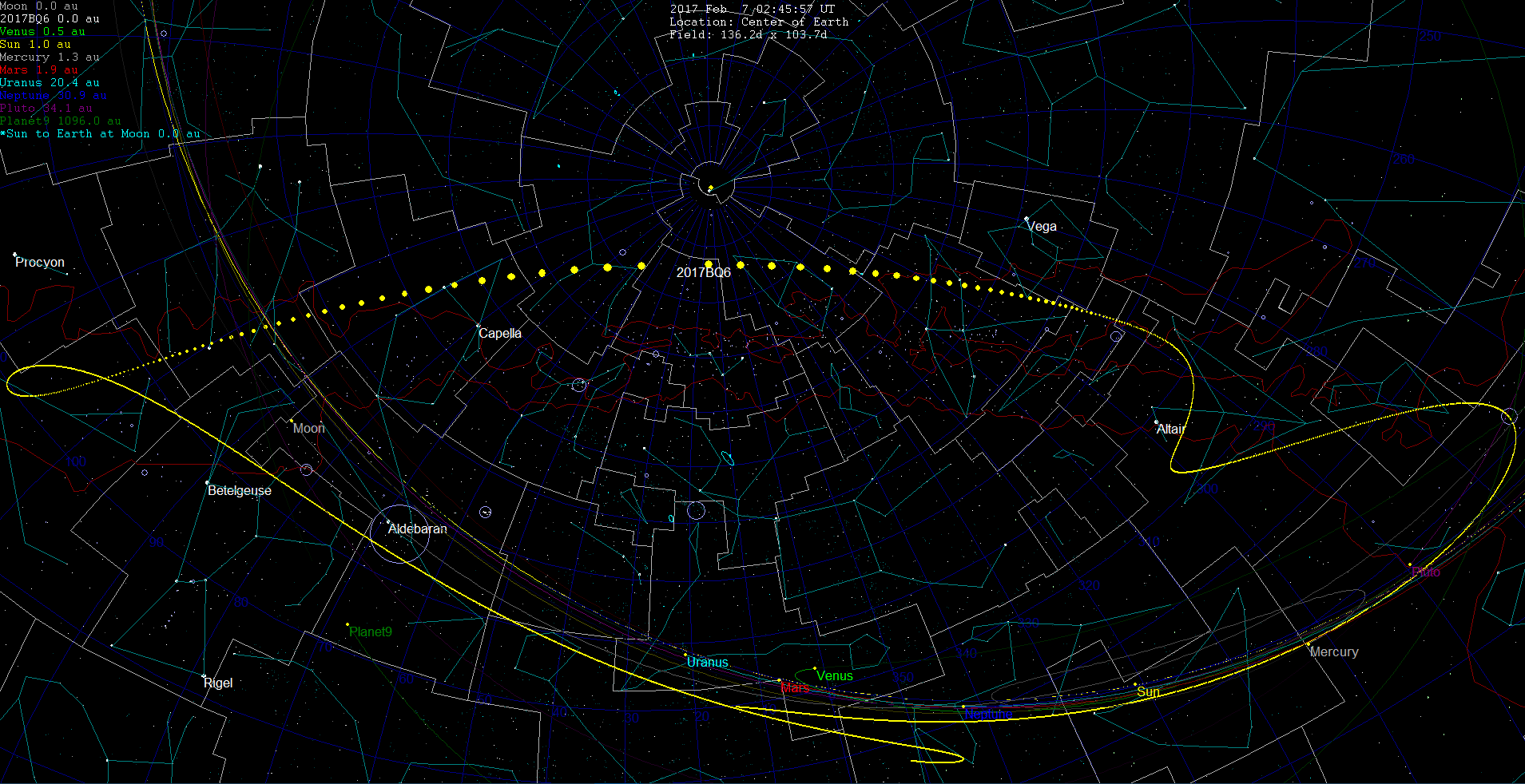
2017 passage across the sky

== Physical characteristics ==
Based on an absolute magnitude of 21.4 and an assumed albedo for stony S-type asteroids of 0.20, 2017 BQ_{6} measures 156 meters in diameter. The body has a rotation period of 2.15 hours and a brightness amplitude of 0.38 magnitude (U=2).
