= 2017 AG13 =

Near-Earth asteroid

2017 AG_{13}
Discovery
- Discovered by: CSS
- Discovery site: Catalina Stn.
- Discovery date: January 7, 2017 (first observed only)

Designations
- Minor planet category: NEO · Aten

Orbital characteristics
- Epoch 27 April 2019 (JD 2458600.5)
- Uncertainty parameter 6 · 5
- Observation arc: 2 days
- Aphelion: 1.3762 AU
- Perihelion: 0.5500 AU
- Semi-major axis: 0.9631 AU
- Eccentricity: 0.4289
- Orbital period (sidereal): 345 days
- Mean anomaly: 84.963°
- Mean motion: 1° 2^{m} 34.08^{s} / day
- Inclination: 16.453°
- Longitude of ascending node: 289.25°
- Argument of perihelion: 297.92°
- Earth MOID: 0.000132757 AU (0.0517 LD)
- Venus MOID: 0.06864 AU

Physical characteristics
- Mean diameter: 15–36 m (est. at 0.30–0.05)
- Absolute magnitude (H): 26.1

2017 AG_{13} is a small Aten asteroid that made a close approach of 0.54 lunar distances from Earth on January 9, 2017. It was the largest asteroid to pass less than 1 lunar distance from Earth since 2016 QA_{2} on August 28, 2016. The Catalina Sky Survey observed it first on January 7, 2017, only two days before its closest approach. At its brightest, 2017 AG_{13} reached apparent magnitude 12.2. Shortly after, it moved too close to the Sun to be seen by telescopes.

The asteroid frequently makes close approaches to Earth, possibly passing as close as 127,000 kilometres (79,000 mi) to Earth on January 9, 2069, however it will most likely pass much farther away.

Based on an absolute magnitude of 26.1, 2017 AG_{13} is likely 15–36 metres (49–118 feet) across, assuming a typical asteroid albedo of between 0.05 and 0.3.
