= List of centaurs (small Solar System bodies) =

Comparison of sizes, albedos, and colors of various large centaurs with measured diameters.

The following is a list of centaurs, a group of non-resonant small Solar System bodies whose orbit around the Sun lie typically between the orbits of Jupiter and Neptune (5 to 30 AU). Centaurs are minor planets with characteristics of comets, and often classified as such. The dynamical group is formed due to Neptune's eroding effect on the Kuiper belt by means of gravitational scattering, sending objects inward to become centaurs, or outward to become scattered-disc objects, or removing them from the Solar System entirely. Centaurs themselves have unstable orbits with short lifetimes, transitioning from the inactive population of Kuiper belt objects to the active group of Jupiter-family comets within a few million years.

== List ==
The list of centaurs is compiled from MPC's MPCORB data file based on criteria defined by the JPL-SBDB, (Note: The JPL Small-Body Database (SBDB), defines centaurs as "Objects with orbits between Jupiter and Neptune (5.5 au < a < 30.1 au)". Uranus and Neptune trojans are excluded if classified as such in the Johnston's Archive. A few unnumbered objects with a poorly determined obribt may be classified differently in the SBDB, as the orbital elements for this list are taken form the MPCORB data file directly. Chiron-type comets are only listed if included in the MPCORB data file.) and completed with objects from the List of Known Trans-Neptunian Objects and The Deep Ecliptic Survey Object Classifications, by William Johnston and Marc Buie, respectively. As of April 2022, this table contains 928 objects. A dedicated column for each of these sources indicates whether an object is considered to be a centaur (✓) or not (✗). (Note: Alternative classifications to centaur (CEN) include trans-Neptunian object (TNO), damocloid (DAM), unusual object (UMP), and resonant trans-Neptunian object, for example "3:2", for plutino). In addition, the classification of the Deep Ecliptic Survey divides centaurs into a R and S group (CENTAURR and CENTAURS).) The table highlights red and grey centaurs with a distinct background color (see legend). (Note: An object's color ranges from BB to RR, split at a B–R magnitude of 1.45 into grey and red centaurs. Only for objects with a B–R color given in Johnston's Archive. Otherwise the table row is not highlighted.)

Legend

Grey centaur (52 objs.) Red centaur (32 objs.) Centaur w/o color indices (439 objs.) Unlikely centaurs are greyed-out (405 objs.) (Note: A greyed-out table row contains an object with a perihelion (q, highlighted in red) that does not lie between the orbit of Jupiter and Neptune (5.1–30.1 AU), and is neither listed as centaur in Johnston's Archive nor in the Deep Ecliptic Survey classification (DES).)

Designation (Note: A bold designation links to an object's stand-alone article. In most other cases, a designation links to the corresponding entry in the list of minor planets or the list of unnumbered minor planets.)	Discovered or first observed (Note: The discovery information is taken from MPC's List Of Centaurs and Scattered-Disk Objects or from a direct MPC Database Search.)		D (Note: An objects mean-diameter is given in kilometers and taken from Johnston's Archive. Otherwise, a calculated diameter is based on an estimated albedo of 0.09 and an absolute magnitude taken form the MPCORB data file.) (km)	Classified as centaur (by source)			Orbital description						Remarks (Note: The uncertainty parameter (U) indicates the quality of the current orbit determination (only displayed for unnumbered objects). In the Solar System Beyond Neptune classification (SSBN07) from 2007, an object is not a centaur, if it has a Jupiter tisserand (T_{J}) below 3.05 and a perihelion less than 7.35 AU. Additional physical properties such as the astronomical albedo, binary status, spectral type and B–R magnitude were taken from Johnston's archive.)	Refs
Designation	Date	Discoverer Observatory	D (km)	SBDB (MPCORB)	Johnston's archive	DES (Buie)	a (AU)	e	i (°)	q (AU)	Q (AU)	T_{J}	Remarks	Refs
944 Hidalgo	31 Oct 1920	W. Baade	52	✓ CEN	✗ UMP	✗	5.7	0.7	42.6	1.9	9.5	2.07	SSBN07: not a centaur albedo: 0.042; suspected binary	catalog · MPC · JPL
2060 Chiron	18 Oct 1977	C. T. Kowal	210	✓ CEN	✓ CEN	✓ R	13.7	0.4	6.9	8.5	18.9	3.36	Grey centaur Chiron-type comet albedo: 0.172; BR-mag: 1.02; taxonomy: BB; rings?	catalog · MPC · JPL
5145 Pholus	9 Jan 1992	Spacewatch	107	✓ CEN	✓ CEN	✓ R	20.3	0.6	24.6	8.7	31.9	3.21	Red centaur albedo: 0.126; BR-mag: 2.00; taxonomy: RR-U	catalog · MPC · JPL
5335 Damocles	18 Feb 1991	R. H. McNaught	13	✓ CEN	✗ DAM	✗	11.9	0.9	61.6	1.6	22.1	1.16	SSBN07: not a centaur	catalog · MPC · JPL
7066 Nessus	26 Apr 1993	Spacewatch	60	✓ CEN	✓ CEN	✓ R	24.7	0.5	15.6	11.9	37.4	3.8	Red centaur albedo: 0.065; BR-mag: 1.88; taxonomy: RR	catalog · MPC · JPL
8405 Asbolus	5 Apr 1995	Spacewatch	84	✓ CEN	✓ CEN	✓ R	18	0.6	17.6	6.8	29.2	3.07	Grey centaur albedo: 0.055; BR-mag: 1.22; taxonomy: BR	catalog · MPC · JPL
10199 Chariklo	15 Feb 1997	Spacewatch	242	✓ CEN	✓ CEN	✓ R	15.8	0.2	23.4	13.2	18.5	3.49	Grey centaur albedo: 0.037; BR-mag: 1.28; taxonomy: BR; rings	catalog · MPC · JPL
10370 Hylonome	27 Feb 1995	D. C. Jewitt; J. X. Luu	77	✓ CEN	✓ CEN	✓ R	25.1	0.2	4.1	18.9	31.2	4.46	Grey centaur albedo: 0.048; BR-mag: 1.12; taxonomy: BR	catalog · MPC · JPL
(15504) 1999 RG_{33}	4 Sep 1999	CSS	23	✓ CEN	✗ DAM	✗	9.4	0.8	35	2.1	16.6	1.95	SSBN07: not a centaur BR-mag: 1.21; MPC: Other UMP	MPC · JPL
20461 Dioretsa	8 Jun 1999	LINEAR	14	✓ CEN	✗ DAM	✗	23.9	0.9	160.4	2.4	45.4	-1.53	SSBN07: not a centaur albedo: 0.030; MPC: Other UMP	catalog · MPC · JPL
(29981) 1999 TD10	3 Oct 1999	Spacewatch	104	✗ TNO	✓ CEN	✓ R	97.3	0.8	6	12.2	175.2	5.22	Grey centaur albedo: 0.044; BR-mag: 1.25; taxonomy: BR	MPC · JPL
31824 Elatus	29 Oct 1999	CSS	57	✓ CEN	✓ CEN	✓ R	11.8	0.4	5.2	7.2	16.3	3.21	Red centaur albedo: 0.050; BR-mag: 1.62; taxonomy: RR	catalog · MPC · JPL
32532 Thereus	9 Aug 2001	NEAT	86	✓ CEN	✓ CEN	✓ R	10.6	0.2	20.4	8.5	12.7	3.11	Grey centaur albedo: 0.059; BR-mag: 1.24; taxonomy: BR	catalog · MPC · JPL
(33128) 1998 BU48	22 Jan 1998	N. Danzl	213	✗ TNO	✓ CEN	✓ R	33.1	0.3	14.3	20.3	43	4.82	Red centaur albedo: 0.052; BR-mag: 1.59; taxonomy: RR; suspected binary	MPC · JPL
37117 Narcissus	1 Nov 2000	W. K. Y. Yeung	11	✓ CEN	✗ UMP	✗	6.9	0.6	13.8	3.1	10.7	2.62	SSBN07: not a centaur albedo: 0.088; MPC: Other UMP	MPC · JPL
42355 Typhon	5 Feb 2002	NEAT	162	✗ TNO	✓ CEN	✓ R	37.6	0.5	2.4	17.5	56.4	4.79	Grey centaur albedo: 0.044; BR-mag: 1.26; taxonomy: BR; binary: 89 km	catalog · MPC · JPL
(44594) 1999 OX3	21 Jul 1999	J. J. Kavelaars; B. Gladman	151	✗ TNO	✓ CEN	✓ R	32.6	0.4	2.6	17.6	45.6	4.74	Red centaur albedo: 0.111; BR-mag: 1.82; taxonomy: RR	catalog · MPC · JPL
49036 Pelion	21 Aug 1998	R. J. Whiteley; D. J. Tholen	46	✓ CEN	✓ CEN	✓ R	20	0.1	9.4	17.3	22.7	4.1	Grey centaur BR-mag: 1.25; taxonomy: BR	MPC · JPL
52872 Okyrhoe	19 Sep 1998	Spacewatch	35	✓ CEN	✓ CEN	✓ R	8.4	0.3	15.6	5.8	10.9	2.95	Grey centaur SSBN07: Jupiter-coupled object albedo: 0.056; BR-mag: 1.32; taxonomy: BR	catalog · MPC · JPL
52975 Cyllarus	12 Oct 1998	N. Danzl	62	✓ CEN	✓ CEN	✓ R	26.1	0.4	12.6	16.2	36.1	4.24	Red centaur albedo: 0.115; BR-mag: 1.81; taxonomy: RR	catalog · MPC · JPL
(54520) 2000 PJ30	5 Aug 2000	M. J. Holman	140	✗ TNO	✓ CEN	✓ R	125.4	0.7	5.7	28.8	213.1	7.02	—	MPC · JPL
54598 Bienor	27 Aug 2000	DES	198	✓ CEN	✓ CEN	✓ R	16.5	0.2	20.7	13.2	19.8	3.58	Grey centaur albedo: 0.043; BR-mag: 1.12; taxonomy: BR	catalog · MPC · JPL
55576 Amycus	8 Apr 2002	NEAT	104	✓ CEN	✓ CEN	✓ R	25.1	0.4	13.3	15.3	35	4.14	Red centaur albedo: 0.083; BR-mag: 1.84; taxonomy: RR	catalog · MPC · JPL
(59358) 1999 CL_{158}	11 Feb 1999	J. X. Luu; C. Trujillo; D. C. Jewitt	143	✗ TNO	✗ CLS?	✓ S	41.2	0.2	10	32.7	49.4	5.55	BR-mag: 1.19; taxonomy: BB-BR	MPC · JPL
60558 Echeclus	3 Mar 2000	Spacewatch	64	✓ CEN	✓ CEN	✓ R	10.7	0.5	4.3	5.8	15.6	3.03	Grey centaur SSBN07: Jupiter-coupled object albedo: 0.054; BR-mag: 1.32; taxonomy: BR	catalog · MPC · JPL
(60608) 2000 EE173	3 Mar 2000	J. X. Luu; C. Trujillo	117	✗ TNO	✓ CEN	✓ R	48.9	0.5	6	22.6	73.4	5.39	Grey centaur albedo: 0.054; BR-mag: 1.15; taxonomy: BR	MPC · JPL
(63252) 2001 BL41	19 Jan 2001	Spacewatch	35	✓ CEN	✓ CEN	✓ R	9.9	0.3	12.5	7	12.8	3.1	Grey centaur albedo: 0.043; BR-mag: 1.20; taxonomy: BR	MPC · JPL
65489 Ceto	22 Mar 2003	C. Trujillo; M. E. Brown	223	✗ TNO	✓ CEN	✓ R	99.4	0.8	22.3	17.8	178.9	4.9	Grey centaur albedo: 0.056; BR-mag: 1.42; taxonomy: BR-IR; binary: 171 km	catalog · MPC · JPL
(73480) 2002 PN34	6 Aug 2002	NEAT	112	✗ TNO	✓ CEN	✓ R	31.2	0.5	16.6	13.3	46.7	4.23	Grey centaur albedo: 0.049; BR-mag: 1.28; taxonomy: BR	MPC · JPL
78799 Xewioso	10 Dec 2002	Palomar Obs.	565	✗ TNO	✓ CEN	✓ R	37.5	0.2	14.3	28	44.9	5.23	albedo: 0.038	catalog · MPC · JPL
83982 Crantor	12 Apr 2002	NEAT	59	✓ CEN	✓ CEN	✓ R	19.5	0.3	12.8	14.2	24.9	3.9	Red centaur albedo: 0.121; BR-mag: 1.89; taxonomy: RR	catalog · MPC · JPL
(87269) 2000 OO67	29 Jul 2000	Cerro Tololo Obs.	80	✗ TNO	✓ CEN	✓ S	636.4	0.9	20.1	20.7	1209.1	9.06	Red centaur BR-mag: 1.69; taxonomy: RR	catalog · MPC · JPL
(87555) 2000 QB243	25 Aug 2000	Cerro Tololo Obs.	92	✗ TNO	✓ CEN	✓ R	35.2	0.5	6.8	15.3	52.8	4.62	Grey centaur albedo: 0.104; BR-mag: 1.07; taxonomy: U	MPC · JPL
(88269) 2001 KF77	22 May 2001	M. W. Buie	70	✓ CEN	✓ CEN	✓ R	26.2	0.2	4.4	19.8	32.5	4.54	Red centaur BR-mag: 1.81	MPC · JPL
(91554) 1999 RZ_{215}	8 Sep 1999	J. X. Luu; C. Trujillo; D. C. Jewitt	104	✗ TNO	✗ SDO	✓ S	104.4	0.7	25.5	31	177.5	5.83	BR-mag: 1.35; taxonomy: IR-BR	MPC · JPL
(95626) 2002 GZ32	13 Apr 2002	Mauna Kea Obs.	237	✓ CEN	✓ CEN	✓ R	23.2	0.2	15	18	28.3	4.2	Grey centaur albedo: 0.043; BR-mag: 1.21; taxonomy: BR	MPC · JPL
(119315) 2001 SQ73	19 Sep 2001	Spacewatch	90	✓ CEN	✓ CEN	✓ R	17.4	0.2	17.4	14.3	20.5	3.73	Grey centaur albedo: 0.048; BR-mag: 1.13; taxonomy: BR	MPC · JPL
(119976) 2002 VR130	7 Nov 2002	M. W. Buie	24	✓ CEN	✓ CEN	✓ R	23.8	0.4	3.5	14.7	33	4.16	albedo: 0.093	MPC · JPL
(120061) 2003 CO1	1 Feb 2003	NEAT	94	✓ CEN	✓ CEN	✓ R	20.8	0.5	19.7	11	30.6	3.57	Grey centaur albedo: 0.049; BR-mag: 1.24; taxonomy: BR	MPC · JPL
(120181) 2003 UR292	24 Oct 2003	M. W. Buie	136	✗ TNO	✓ CEN	✓ R	32.4	0.1	2.7	26.7	35.7	5.12	Red centaur albedo: 0.105; BR-mag: 1.69	MPC · JPL
121725 Aphidas	13 Dec 1999	C. Hergenrother	92	✓ CEN	✓ CEN	✓ R	17.9	0.5	6.8	9.6	26.2	3.55	Red centaur BR-mag: 1.86; taxonomy: RR	MPC · JPL
(127546) 2002 XU93	4 Dec 2002	M. W. Buie	164	✗ TNO	✓ CEN	✓ R	65.9	0.6	78	20.9	105.4	1.27	Grey centaur albedo: 0.038; BR-mag: 1.20; taxonomy: BB-BR	catalog · MPC · JPL
(136204) 2003 WL7	16 Nov 2003	Spacewatch	105	✓ CEN	✓ CEN	✓ R	20.1	0.3	11.2	14.9	25.2	3.98	Grey centaur albedo: 0.053; BR-mag: 1.23	MPC · JPL
(144908) 2004 YH_{32}	18 Dec 2004	SSS	16	✓ CEN	✗ DAM	✗	8.2	0.6	79.1	3.5	12.8	1.03	SSBN07: not a centaur MPC: Other UMP	catalog · MPC · JPL
(145486) 2005 UJ438	28 Oct 2005	Spacewatch	16	✓ CEN	✓ CEN	✓ R	17.6	0.5	3.8	8.3	26.9	3.41	Red centaur albedo: 0.256; BR-mag: 1.50	MPC · JPL
(145627) 2006 RY_{102}	14 Sep 2006	NEAT	37	✓ CEN	✗ UMP	✗	6.3	0.3	18.7	4.6	8.1	2.83	SSBN07: not a centaur albedo: 0.051; MPC: Other UMP	MPC · JPL
(148975) 2001 XA255	9 Dec 2001	D. C. Jewitt; S. S. Sheppard	38	✓ CEN	✓ CEN	✓ R	28.9	0.7	12.6	9.4	48.3	3.57	Red centaur albedo: 0.041; BR-mag: 1.49	catalog · MPC · JPL
(149560) 2003 QZ91	24 Aug 2003	M. W. Buie	134	✗ TNO	✓ CEN	✓ R	41.9	0.4	34.8	21.8	58.6	4.4	Grey centaur BR-mag: 1.30	MPC · JPL
(152824) 1999 UU_{43}	29 Oct 1999	CSS	4.6	✗ MBA-O	✗	✓ S	3.1	0.1	11.4	2.9	3.3	3.19	—	MPC · JPL
(154783) 2004 PA_{44}	7 Aug 2004	NEAT	11	✓ CEN	✗ UMP	✗	14.2	0.8	3.3	3.4	25	2.52	SSBN07: not a centaur MPC: Other UMP	MPC · JPL
(160427) 2005 RL43	3 Sep 2005	A. C. Becker; A. W. Puckett	143	✓ CEN	✓ CEN	✓ R	24.6	0	12.3	23.5	25.6	4.45	Red centaur BR-mag: 1.85	MPC · JPL
(187661) 2007 JG43	10 May 2007	M. Schwamb; M. E. Brown	80	✓ CEN	✓ CEN	✓ R	24.1	0.4	33.1	14.3	33.9	3.51	—	MPC · JPL
(205823) 2002 CP_{264}	8 Feb 2002	M. W. Buie	1.8	✗ MBA-I	✗	✓ S	2.4	0.1	6.2	2.1	2.7	3.53	—	MPC · JPL
(241097) 2007 DU112	23 Feb 2007	Spacewatch	34	✗ TNO	✓ CEN	✓ R	40.5	0.7	15.7	9	68.9	3.97	—	MPC · JPL
(248835) 2006 SX368	16 Sep 2006	A. C. Becker; A. W. Puckett	76	✓ CEN	✓ CEN	✓ R	22.2	0.5	36.3	12	32.4	3.19	Grey centaur albedo: 0.052; BR-mag: 1.27; taxonomy: BR	catalog · MPC · JPL
(250112) 2002 KY14	19 May 2002	C. Trujillo; M. E. Brown	47	✓ CEN	✓ CEN	✓ R	12.5	0.3	19.5	8.6	16.5	3.19	Red centaur albedo: 0.057; BR-mag: 1.75; taxonomy: RR; suspected binary	MPC · JPL
(281371) 2008 FC76	31 Mar 2008	MLS	68	✓ CEN	✓ CEN	✓ R	14.7	0.3	27.1	10.2	19.2	3.2	Red centaur albedo: 0.067; BR-mag: 1.65; taxonomy: RR	MPC · JPL
(306173) 2010 NK_{83}	1 Jul 2010	WISE	12	✓ CEN	✗ UMP	✗	5.9	0.6	11.3	2.5	9.3	2.58	SSBN07: not a centaur albedo: 0.048	MPC · JPL
(308607) 2005 WY_{3}	21 Nov 2005	Spacewatch	12	✓ CEN	✗ UMP	✗	6.7	0.7	29.4	1.8	11.7	2.12	SSBN07: not a centaur MPC: Other UMP	MPC · JPL
(308933) 2006 SQ372	27 Sep 2006	A. C. Becker; A. W. Puckett	153	✗ TNO	✓ CEN	✓ S	1113.8	0.9	19.4	24.1	2116.2	12.03	Red centaur BR-mag: 1.62; taxonomy: IR-RR	catalog · MPC · JPL
(309139) 2006 XQ51	14 Dec 2006	MLS	39	✓ CEN	✓ CEN	✓ R	15.8	0.4	31.6	9.8	21.8	3.08	Grey centaur albedo: 0.139; BR-mag: 1.15	MPC · JPL
(309239) 2007 RW10	9 Sep 2007	Palomar Obs.	247	✗ TNO	✓ CEN	✓ R	30.4	0.3	36	21.2	39.5	3.9	albedo: 0.083	catalog · MPC · JPL
(309737) 2008 SJ236	29 Sep 2008	Spacewatch	18	✓ CEN	✓ CEN	✓ R	10.9	0.4	6.1	6.1	15.7	3.07	Red centaur albedo: 0.074; BR-mag: 1.60; taxonomy: RR	MPC · JPL
(309741) 2008 UZ6	22 Oct 2008	Spacewatch	40	✓ CEN	✓ CEN	✓ R	27	0.6	35.8	10.5	43.5	3.12	Red centaur BR-mag: 1.52	MPC · JPL
(310071) 2010 KR59	18 May 2010	WISE	110	✓ CEN	✓ CEN	✓ R	29.8	0.6	19.7	13	46.7	3.9	albedo: 0.121	catalog · MPC · JPL
(315898) 2008 QD4	25 Aug 2008	Mallorca Obs.	31	✓ CEN	✓ CEN	✓ R	8.4	0.4	42.1	5.4	11.3	2.38	Grey centaur SSBN07: not a centaur BR-mag: 1.20	catalog · MPC · JPL
(316179) 2010 EN65	7 Mar 2010	D. Rabinowitz; S. Tourtellotte	205	✗ TNO	✓ CEN	✓ R	30.5	0.3	19.3	21	39.6	4.53	—	catalog · MPC · JPL
(318875) 2005 TS_{100}	7 Oct 2005	Spacewatch	7.7	✓ CEN	✗	✗	5.6	0.2	8.5	4.6	6.5	2.95	SSBN07: not a centaur	MPC · JPL
(328884) 2010 LJ109	17 Feb 2010	MLS	44	✓ CEN	✓ CEN	✓ R	13.2	0.3	24.8	9.2	17.2	3.15	albedo: 0.083	MPC · JPL
(330759) 2008 SO_{218}	30 Sep 2008	MLS	14	✓ CEN	✗ DAM	✗	8.1	0.6	170.3	3.6	12.7	-1.4	SSBN07: not a centaur albedo: 0.076; BR-mag: 1.44; MPC: Other UMP	MPC · JPL
330836 Orius	25 Apr 2009	K. Černis; I. Eglītis	58	✓ CEN	✓ CEN	✓ R	21.5	0.4	17.9	12.5	30.5	3.76	—	MPC · JPL
(332685) 2009 HH36	19 Apr 2009	Spacewatch	33	✓ CEN	✓ CEN	✓ R	12.7	0.4	23.3	7.1	18.4	2.98	SSBN07: not a centaur albedo: 0.078	MPC · JPL
(336756) 2010 NV1	1 Jul 2010	WISE	52	✗ TNO	✓ CEN	✓ R	279.6	0.9	140.7	9.4	531.2	-4.93	Grey centaur albedo: 0.042; BR-mag: 1.32	catalog · MPC · JPL
(341275) 2007 RG283	15 Sep 2007	Palomar Obs.	105	✓ CEN	✓ CEN	✓ R	19.9	0.2	28.8	15.3	24.5	3.6	Grey centaur BR-mag: 1.26	MPC · JPL
(342842) 2008 YB3	18 Dec 2008	SSS	67	✓ CEN	✓ CEN	✓ R	11.6	0.4	105.1	6.5	16.7	-0.25	Grey centaur SSBN07: not a centaur albedo: 0.062; BR-mag: 1.25; taxonomy: BR	catalog · MPC · JPL
346889 Rhiphonos	28 Aug 2009	T. V. Kryachko	23	✓ CEN	✓ CEN	✓ R	10.8	0.4	20	6	15.5	2.9	Grey centaur SSBN07: not a centaur albedo: 0.062; BR-mag: 1.37	MPC · JPL
(347449) 2012 TW_{236}	23 Apr 1998	LINEAR	18	✓ CEN	✗ UMP	✗	7	0.6	12	3	10.9	2.61	SSBN07: not a centaur MPC: Other UMP	MPC · JPL
(349933) 2009 YF7	19 Dec 2009	D. Rabinowitz	37	✓ CEN	✓ CEN	✓ R	12.1	0.5	31	6.5	17.6	2.75	Grey centaur SSBN07: not a centaur BR-mag: 1.18	MPC · JPL
(353222) 2009 YD7	16 Dec 2009	D. Rabinowitz	56	✗ TNO	✓ CEN	✓ R	119.8	0.8	30.8	13.3	215.6	4.99	suspected binary	MPC · JPL
365756 ISON	4 Nov 2010	L. Elenin	8	✓ CEN	✗ UMP	✗	5.7	0.5	20	2.7	8.7	2.59	SSBN07: not a centaur	MPC · JPL
(380282) 2002 AO_{148}	11 Jan 2002	LINEAR	11	✓ CEN	✗	✗	5.7	0.3	19.2	4.2	7.2	2.82	SSBN07: not a centaur	MPC · JPL
(382004) 2010 RM64	9 Sep 2010	D. Rabinowitz; M. Schwamb	21	✓ CEN	✓ CEN	✓ R	19.7	0.7	27	6.1	33.3	2.78	Red centaur SSBN07: not a centaur albedo: 0.159; BR-mag: 1.56	MPC · JPL
(386968) 2012 BR61	30 Dec 2008	Spacewatch	75	✓ CEN	✓ CEN	✓ R	21.5	0.5	2	11.7	31.3	3.86	—	MPC · JPL
(389820) 2011 WU92	12 Oct 2010	MLS	15	✓ CEN	✓ CEN	✓ R	8.8	0.4	6.5	5.6	12.1	2.99	SSBN07: not a centaur	MPC · JPL
(395699) 2012 GN12	1 Jan 2008	Spacewatch	40	✓ CEN	✓ CEN	✓ R	15.1	0.4	12.6	9.5	20.7	3.43	—	MPC · JPL
(413666) 2005 VJ119	7 Nov 2005	F. Bernardi	28	✗ TNO	✓ CEN	✓ R	35.2	0.6	7	11.3	56.3	4.28	albedo: 0.120	MPC · JPL
(418993) 2009 MS9	25 Jun 2009	J.-M. Petit; B. Gladman	62	✗ TNO	✓ CEN	✓ R	388.8	0.9	68	10.9	738.6	2.84	Grey centaur BR-mag: 1.36	catalog · MPC · JPL
(427507) 2002 DH5	20 Feb 2002	Spacewatch	53	✓ CEN	✓ CEN	✓ R	22	0.4	22.5	14	30	3.78	Grey centaur BR-mag: 1.05; taxonomy: BB-BR	MPC · JPL
(433873) 2015 BQ311	3 Jun 2006	MLS	20	✓ CEN	✓ CEN	✓ R	7.1	0.3	24.5	5	9.2	2.77	Grey centaur SSBN07: not a centaur BR-mag: 1.25; MPC: Other UMP	MPC · JPL
(434620) 2005 VD	1 Nov 2005	MLS	9	✓ CEN	✗ DAM	✗	6.7	0.3	172.9	5	8.3	-1.39	SSBN07: not a centaur BR-mag: 1.05; MPC: Other UMP	catalog · MPC · JPL
(437313) 2013 EK73	24 Feb 2012	MLS	13	✓ CEN	✓ CEN	✓ R	13	0.6	9	5.4	20.5	2.93	SSBN07: not a centaur	MPC · JPL
(447178) 2005 RO43	3 Sep 2005	A. C. Becker; A. W. Puckett	194	✓ CEN	✓ CEN	✓ R	28.7	0.5	35.5	13.9	43.6	3.46	Grey centaur albedo: 0.056; BR-mag: 1.24	MPC · JPL
(449097) 2012 UT68	22 Oct 2011	MLS	69	✓ CEN	✓ CEN	✓ R	20.2	0.4	15.4	12.6	27.8	3.78	Red centaur BR-mag: 1.68	MPC · JPL
(459865) 2013 XZ8	31 Oct 2008	Spacewatch	65	✓ CEN	✓ CEN	✓ R	13.4	0.4	22.5	8.4	18.3	3.14	Grey centaur BR-mag: 1.17	MPC · JPL
(459870) 2014 AT28	26 Nov 2013	Pan-STARRS	21	✓ CEN	✓ CEN	✓ R	10.9	0.4	165.5	6.5	15.3	-2.09	SSBN07: not a centaur	MPC · JPL
(459971) 2014 ON6	18 Mar 2010	Spacewatch	27	✓ CEN	✓ CEN	✓ R	13.4	0.6	3.9	5.8	20.9	3.03	Red centaur SSBN07: not a centaur BR-mag: 1.55	MPC · JPL
(461363) 2000 GQ_{148}	5 Apr 2000	LINEAR	9.8	✓ CEN	✗	✗	5.8	0.1	16.6	5	6.6	2.9	SSBN07: not a centaur	MPC · JPL
463368 Eurytus	14 Nov 2012	K. Černis; R. P. Boyle	193	✓ CEN	✓ CEN	✓ R	29.2	0.3	15.1	20.2	38.1	4.53	Red centaur BR-mag: 1.70; suspected binary	MPC · JPL
(463663) 2014 HY123	13 Dec 2013	MLS	31	✓ CEN	✓ CEN	✓ R	18.7	0.6	13.9	7	30.4	3.15	Grey centaur BR-mag: 1.16	MPC · JPL
(468861) 2013 LU28	8 Jun 2013	MLS	114	✗ TNO	✓ CEN	✓ R	192.3	0.9	125.3	8.7	365.4	-3.04	—	catalog · MPC · JPL
(469442) 2002 GG166	9 Apr 2002	M. W. Buie	126	✗ TNO	✓ CEN	✓ R	34.7	0.5	7.7	14.1	52.1	4.58	—	MPC · JPL
(469750) 2005 PU21	9 Aug 2005	Cerro Tololo Obs.	280	✗ TNO	✓ CEN	✓ R	181.6	0.8	6.2	29.3	326.9	7.08	Red centaur BR-mag: 1.79; taxonomy: RR	MPC · JPL
(470309) 2007 JK43	10 May 2007	Palomar Obs.	194	✗ TNO	✓ CEN	✓ R	46.5	0.4	44.9	23.5	65.1	3.99	Grey centaur BR-mag: 1.40	MPC · JPL
(470593) 2008 LP17	6 Jun 2008	Palomar Obs.	320	✗ TNO	✓ CEN	✓ R	89.8	0.6	14.1	29.8	143.7	6.5	—	MPC · JPL
(471136) 2010 EO65	9 Mar 2010	D. Rabinowitz; S. Tourtellotte	70	✓ CEN	✓ CEN	✓ R	25.2	0.4	11.4	14	36.4	4.07	—	MPC · JPL
(471149) 2010 FB49	17 Mar 2010	D. Rabinowitz; S. Tourtellotte	178	✓ CEN	✓ CEN	✓ R	22.5	0.2	24.4	18	26.9	3.94	—	MPC · JPL
(471155) 2010 GF65	14 Apr 2010	D. Rabinowitz; S. Tourtellotte	212	✗ TNO	✓ CEN	✓ R	33.5	0.3	12.4	22	43.5	4.88	—	MPC · JPL
(471237) 2011 AC72	3 Jan 2011	MLS	37	✓ CEN	✓ CEN	✓ R	25.6	0.6	13.8	11.2	40.1	3.77	—	MPC · JPL
(471272) 2011 FY9	27 Mar 2011	La Silla Obs.	90	✗ TNO	✓ CEN	✓ R	58.1	0.7	37.8	15.2	98.8	3.86	—	MPC · JPL
471325 Taowu	31 May 2011	MLS	178	✗ TNO	✓ CEN	✓ R	35.7	0.3	110.2	23.9	46.4	-1.58	—	catalog · MPC · JPL
(471335) 2011 OD16	25 Jul 2011	Pan-STARRS	92	✓ CEN	✓ CEN	✓ R	24	0.2	6.3	19.5	28.5	4.41	—	MPC · JPL
(471339) 2011 ON45	27 Jul 2011	Pan-STARRS	31	✓ CEN	✓ CEN	✓ R	11.7	0.2	8.2	9.8	13.5	3.37	Red centaur BR-mag: 1.81	MPC · JPL
(471512) 2012 CG	1 Feb 2012	MLS	94	✓ CEN	✓ CEN	✓ R	28.7	0.5	14.6	14.4	43	4.12	—	MPC · JPL
(471513) 2012 CE17	3 Feb 2012	Pan-STARRS	88	✓ CEN	✓ CEN	✓ R	21.4	0.1	5.9	19	23.8	4.25	—	MPC · JPL
(471931) 2013 PH44	12 Aug 2013	Pan-STARRS	74	✓ CEN	✓ CEN	✓ R	19.8	0.2	33.5	15.5	24	3.44	suspected binary	MPC · JPL
(472265) 2014 SR303	19 Sep 2014	Pan-STARRS	32	✓ CEN	✓ CEN	✓ R	15.1	0.3	3	10.3	19.8	3.57	—	MPC · JPL
(472651) 2015 DB216	27 Feb 2015	MLS	109	✓ CEN	✓ CEN	✓ R	19.1	0.3	37.8	12.9	25.2	3.14	—	catalog · MPC · JPL
(472760) 2015 FZ117	23 Mar 2015	Pan-STARRS	36	✓ CEN	✓ CEN	✓ R	22.8	0.4	6.8	13.1	32.5	3.99	—	MPC · JPL
(492338) 2014 FW	12 Mar 2014	MLS	55	✓ CEN	✓ CEN	✓ R	29.2	0.6	12.7	10.8	47.5	3.76	—	MPC · JPL
(494158) 2016 EX	16 Jan 2013	Pan-STARRS	15	✓ CEN	✓ CEN	✓ R	8.6	0.3	6.3	6	11.2	3.04	SSBN07: not a centaur	MPC · JPL
(494219) 2016 LN_{8}	23 Sep 2012	MLS	13	✓ CEN	✗	✗	5.7	0.1	43.3	5.4	6	2.43	SSBN07: not a centaur	MPC · JPL
(499522) 2010 PL66	14 Aug 2010	D. Rabinowitz; M. Schwamb	144	✓ CEN	✓ CEN	✓ R	21.3	0.4	24.3	13.2	29.4	3.65	—	MPC · JPL
(501214) 2013 TC146	5 Oct 2013	M. W. Buie	258	✓ CEN	✓ CEN	✓ R	25.4	0.2	14.2	21.3	29.5	4.43	—	MPC · JPL
(501546) 2014 JJ_{80}	9 Jul 2013	Pan-STARRS	293	✗ TNO	✗ TNO	✓ R	43.5	0.2	18.7	31.2	52.2	5.48	—	catalog · MPC · JPL
(501585) 2014 QA_{43}	10 Apr 2014	Pan-STARRS	28	✓ CEN	✗ UMP	✗	9.7	0.5	37.2	4.8	14.6	2.41	SSBN07: not a centaur	MPC · JPL
(503273) 2015 PN291	25 Jul 2014	Pan-STARRS	24	✓ CEN	✓ CEN	✓ R	14.5	0.5	9.5	6.6	22.4	3.12	—	MPC · JPL
(506028) 2015 HO171	30 May 2014	MLS	22	✓ CEN	✓ CEN	✓ R	8.7	0.2	33.2	6.6	10.7	2.7	SSBN07: not a centaur	MPC · JPL
(508338) 2015 SO_{20}	8 Oct 2010	M. E. Schwamb	175	✗ TNO	✗ SDO	✓ S	170.6	0.8	23.4	33.1	307.1	6.34	—	catalog · MPC · JPL
(511130) 2013 WV107	25 Nov 2013	Pan-STARRS	56	✓ CEN	✓ CEN	✓ R	14.6	0.3	24	10.7	18.5	3.31	—	MPC · JPL
(514312) 2016 AE193	26 Oct 2006	LUSS	118	✗ TNO	✓ CEN	✓ R	30.8	0.4	10.3	16.4	43.1	4.56	suspected binary	MPC · JPL
(517717) 2015 KZ120	20 May 2015	Pan-STARRS	53	✗ TNO	✓ CEN	✓ R	47	0.8	85.5	8.3	84.5	0.39	—	MPC · JPL
(518151) 2016 FH13	29 Mar 2016	Pan-STARRS	49	✓ CEN	✓ CEN	✓ R	24.5	0.6	93.6	9.4	39.6	-0.01	—	MPC · JPL
(523597) 2002 QX47	26 Aug 2002	C. Trujillo; M. E. Brown	97	✓ CEN	✓ CEN	✓ R	25.6	0.4	7.3	16	35.1	4.28	Grey centaur BR-mag: 1.08	MPC · JPL
(523620) 2007 RH283	15 Sep 2007	Palomar Obs.	106	✓ CEN	✓ CEN	✓ R	15.9	0.3	21.4	10.5	21.3	3.39	Grey centaur BR-mag: 1.24	MPC · JPL
(523643) 2010 TY53	4 Aug 2010	Pan-STARRS	420	✗ TNO	✓ CEN	✓ R	39.2	0.4	22.5	21.1	54.9	4.78	—	catalog · MPC · JPL
(523649) 2010 XZ78	24 Sep 2010	Pan-STARRS	13	✓ CEN	✓ CEN	✓ R	7.7	0.3	39.2	5.4	9.9	2.48	SSBN07: not a centaur	MPC · JPL
(523652) 2011 LZ28	15 Jun 2010	Pan-STARRS	206	✗ TNO	✓ CEN	✓ R	64.1	0.5	13.5	27.9	96.1	5.99	—	MPC · JPL
(523672) 2013 FJ28	16 Mar 2013	S. S. Sheppard	134	✗ TNO	✓ CEN	✓ R	35	0.4	21.9	19.4	48.9	4.56	—	MPC · JPL
(523673) 2013 MZ11	4 Aug 2010	Pan-STARRS	135	✓ CEN	✓ CEN	✓ R	24.5	0.3	6.4	16.9	32.1	4.31	—	MPC · JPL
(523676) 2013 UL10	18 Aug 2010	Pan-STARRS	15	✓ CEN	✓ CEN	✓ R	9.9	0.4	19.2	6.2	13.7	2.94	Red centaur SSBN07: not a centaur BR-mag: 1.64	catalog · MPC · JPL
(523682) 2014 CN23	15 Mar 2012	Pan-STARRS	97	✓ CEN	✓ CEN	✓ R	16.4	0.3	14.1	11.3	21.4	3.59	—	MPC · JPL
(523686) 2014 DB143	12 Apr 2010	Pan-STARRS	84	✓ CEN	✓ CEN	✓ R	20.2	0.1	21.3	18.4	22	3.91	—	MPC · JPL
(523695) 2014 GS53	12 Apr 2010	Pan-STARRS	279	✗ TNO	✓ CEN	✓ R	33.4	0	15.2	30.1	33.4	5.05	—	MPC · JPL
(523708) 2014 JB80	28 Apr 2011	Pan-STARRS	35	✓ CEN	✓ CEN	✓ R	19.3	0.3	13.4	12.7	26	3.79	—	MPC · JPL
(523709) 2014 JD80	18 Jun 2013	Pan-STARRS	80	✓ CEN	✓ CEN	✓ S	25.5	0.3	39	19	32	3.53	—	MPC · JPL
(523710) 2014 JF80	3 Aug 2011	Pan-STARRS	91	✗ TNO	✓ CEN	✓ R	34.3	0.4	13.8	18.7	48	4.72	—	MPC · JPL
(523714) 2014 KR101	27 Apr 2011	Pan-STARRS	28	✓ CEN	✓ CEN	✓ R	14.7	0.3	9.1	10.6	18.9	3.54	—	MPC · JPL
(523719) 2014 LM28	16 May 2013	Pan-STARRS	58	✗ TNO	✓ CEN	✓ R	289.5	0.9	84.8	16.7	550.1	0.61	—	catalog · MPC · JPL
(523720) 2014 LN28	11 May 2011	Pan-STARRS	118	✗ TNO	✓ CEN	✓ R	36.8	0.5	8.7	16.2	55.2	4.69	—	MPC · JPL
(523727) 2014 NW65	14 Jul 2010	Pan-STARRS	275	✓ CEN	✓ CEN	✓ R	23.3	0.5	20.4	11.2	35.3	3.61	—	catalog · MPC · JPL
(523729) 2014 OX393	3 Jul 2013	Pan-STARRS	34	✓ CEN	✓ CEN	✓ R	25.7	0.5	14.7	12	39.5	3.84	—	MPC · JPL
(523733) 2014 PR70	18 Aug 2010	Pan-STARRS	46	✗ TNO	✓ CEN	✓ R	71.7	0.7	7.6	14.4	121.8	5.33	—	MPC · JPL
(523734) 2014 QV441	31 Aug 2010	Pan-STARRS	99	✗ TNO	✓ CEN	✓ R	31.9	0.4	26.5	18.7	44.6	4.22	—	MPC · JPL
(523739) 2014 TZ33	8 Aug 2013	Pan-STARRS	31	✗ TNO	✓ CEN	✓ R	38.4	0.7	85.9	9.4	65.3	0.41	—	MPC · JPL
(523740) 2014 TV85	24 Jan 2012	Pan-STARRS	69	✓ CEN	✓ CEN	✓ R	21.6	0.3	12.2	14.6	28.5	4.01	—	MPC · JPL
(523741) 2014 TY_{85}	8 Oct 2010	Pan-STARRS	190	✗ TNO	✗ TNO	✓ S	41.1	0.2	19.1	32.5	49.4	5.33	—	MPC · JPL
(523746) 2014 UT114	17 Sep 2010	Pan-STARRS	88	✗ TNO	✓ CEN	✓ R	30.2	0.4	15.2	15.8	42.3	4.44	—	MPC · JPL
(523753) 2014 WV508	7 Dec 2013	Pan-STARRS	72	✗ TNO	✓ CEN	✓ R	53.5	0.7	21.2	15.5	90.9	4.37	—	MPC · JPL
(523754) 2014 WX508	30 Dec 2013	Pan-STARRS	34	✓ CEN	✓ CEN	✓ R	18.5	0.3	11.6	13.2	23.7	3.82	—	MPC · JPL
(523755) 2014 WZ508	3 Mar 2010	Pan-STARRS	146	✗ TNO	✓ CEN	✓ R	76.5	0.6	24.3	23.4	122.4	5.66	—	MPC · JPL
(523770) 2014 XO40	20 Mar 2013	Pan-STARRS	139	✗ TNO	✓ CEN	✓ R	58.1	0.7	26.9	16.1	98.7	4.34	—	MPC · JPL
(523771) 2014 XP40	25 Jan 2012	Pan-STARRS	211	✗ TNO	✓ CEN	✓ R	100.9	0.7	11.5	27.8	171.6	6.22	—	MPC · JPL
(523782) 2015 BD518	16 Dec 2011	Pan-STARRS	70	✓ CEN	✓ CEN	✓ R	23.2	0.3	17.2	16.3	30	4.07	—	MPC · JPL
(523783) 2015 BG518	30 Jan 2011	Pan-STARRS	22	✓ CEN	✓ CEN	✓ R	14.6	0.3	1.8	10.2	19.1	3.55	—	MPC · JPL
(523784) 2015 BJ518	15 Feb 2013	Pan-STARRS	118	✓ CEN	✓ CEN	✓ R	21.4	0.3	6.4	14.7	28.2	4.07	—	MPC · JPL
(523785) 2015 CM3	23 Oct 2011	Pan-STARRS	15	✓ CEN	✓ CEN	✓ R	14	0.5	16.8	6.9	21.1	3.08	Red centaur BR-mag: 1.78	MPC · JPL
(523787) 2015 DV224	26 Jan 2014	Pan-STARRS	153	✗ TNO	✓ CEN	✓ R	55.8	0.6	29.5	22	89.2	4.65	—	MPC · JPL
(523790) 2015 HP9	1 Jun 2010	Pan-STARRS	46	✓ CEN	✓ CEN	✓ R	18.2	0.3	3.1	13.3	23	3.88	—	MPC · JPL
(523791) 2015 HT171	16 Dec 2011	Pan-STARRS	18	✓ CEN	✓ CEN	✓ R	11.6	0.3	33.2	8.2	14.9	2.84	—	MPC · JPL
(523797) 2016 NM56	1 Nov 2012	Pan-STARRS	29	✗ TNO	✓ CEN	✓ R	71.4	0.8	144	10.5	128.6	-3.52	—	MPC · JPL
(523798) 2017 CX33	11 Dec 2014	Pan-STARRS	33	✗ TNO	✓ CEN	✓ R	72.8	0.8	72.1	10.4	131.1	1.45	suspected binary	MPC · JPL
(523800) 2017 KZ31	23 Jun 2015	Pan-STARRS	48	✗ TNO	✓ CEN	✓ R	54.4	0.7	161.7	10.9	92.5	-4.29	—	MPC · JPL
(524613) 2003 QW113	31 Aug 2003	Mauna Kea Obs.	193	✗ TNO	✓ CEN	✓ R	51.7	0.4	6.9	26.3	72.4	5.84	—	MPC · JPL
(527328) 2007 TK422	6 Oct 2007	A. C. Becker; A. W. Puckett	77	✓ CEN	✓ CEN	✓ R	21.2	0.2	3.1	17.1	25.2	4.2	Grey centaur BR-mag: 1.22	MPC · JPL
(527443) 2007 UM126	30 Oct 2007	SDSS	44	✓ CEN	✓ CEN	✓ R	12.9	0.3	41.7	8.5	17.2	2.61	Grey centaur BR-mag: 1.08; taxonomy: BB-BR	MPC · JPL
(527604) 2007 VL_{305}	4 Nov 2007	A. C. Becker; A. W. Puckett; J. Kubica	88	✓ CEN	✗	✗ 1:1	30.1	0.1	28.1	28.1	32	4.41	—	catalog · MPC · JPL
(528219) 2008 KV42	31 May 2008	Mauna Kea Obs.	97	✗ TNO	✓ CEN	✓ R	42.1	0.4	103.4	21.1	58.9	-1.09	Grey centaur BR-mag: 1.29; taxonomy: BR	catalog · MPC · JPL
(529939) 2010 TU191	7 Oct 2010	Pan-STARRS	39	✓ CEN	✓ CEN	✓ R	20.7	0.3	1.8	14.7	26.6	4.07	—	MPC · JPL
(530930) 2011 WG_{157}	13 Oct 2010	Pan-STARRS	156	✓ CEN	✗	✗ 1:1	30.1	0	22.3	29.3	30.8	4.62	—	MPC · JPL
(531942) 2013 CV82	10 Jan 2013	Pan-STARRS	25	✓ CEN	✓ CEN	✓ R	17	0.4	18.5	10.7	23.4	3.49	—	MPC · JPL
(532027) 2013 EH154	15 Mar 2011	Pan-STARRS	142	✗ TNO	✓ CEN	✓ R	31.7	0.1	8.2	25.4	34.9	5.03	—	MPC · JPL
(532094) 2013 HX156	15 Apr 2012	Pan-STARRS	130	✓ CEN	✓ CEN	✓ R	24.4	0.2	14.9	19.6	29.2	4.32	—	MPC · JPL
(532184) 2013 OR11	17 Oct 2012	Pan-STARRS	193	✗ TNO	✓ CEN	✓ R	80.6	0.6	21.2	29.8	129	5.94	—	MPC · JPL
(532660) 2013 VE2	18 Aug 2010	Pan-STARRS	13	✓ CEN	✓ CEN	✓ R	8.9	0.2	7.1	6.8	11	3.11	—	MPC · JPL
(533085) 2014 BW64	9 May 2010	Pan-STARRS	189	✗ TNO	✗ SDO	✓ S	45.6	0.3	15.8	30	59.3	5.55	—	MPC · JPL
(533396) 2014 GQ53	2 Feb 2011	Pan-STARRS	74	✓ CEN	✓ CEN	✓ R	25.3	0.3	22.7	17.4	33.1	4.07	—	MPC · JPL
(533559) 2014 JG80	28 Apr 2011	Pan-STARRS	146	✓ CEN	✓ CEN	✓ R	21.3	0.3	32.7	15.1	27.4	3.5	—	MPC · JPL
(534251) 2014 SW223	9 Aug 2013	Pan-STARRS	13	✓ CEN	✓ CEN	✓ R	9	0.2	10.7	7.6	10.4	3.13	—	MPC · JPL
(534631) 2014 UX229	13 Sep 2010	Pan-STARRS	91	✗ TNO	✗ TNO	✓ R	39.9	0.3	15.9	26.3	51.9	5.21	—	MPC · JPL
(535017) 2014 WY508	9 Feb 2013	Pan-STARRS	176	✗ TNO	✓ CEN	✓ R	97.8	0.7	21.3	28.7	166.3	5.82	—	MPC · JPL
(535169) 2014 XX_{40}	20 Jan 2012	Pan-STARRS	128	✗ TNO	✗ SDO	✓ S	79.2	0.5	19.7	32.1	118.7	6.43	—	MPC · JPL
(535985) 2015 BF515	31 Dec 2012	Pan-STARRS	58	✓ CEN	✓ CEN	✓ R	20.3	0.2	28.4	16.9	23.7	3.68	—	MPC · JPL
(535992) 2015 BF519	25 Jan 2012	Pan-STARRS	117	✗ TNO	✗ TNO	✓ R	39	0.3	19.2	26.5	50.6	5.06	—	MPC · JPL
(538495) 2016 EB195	24 Nov 2011	Pan-STARRS	22	✓ CEN	✓ CEN	✓ R	14.8	0.5	20.8	8	21.6	3.15	—	MPC · JPL
(540205) 2017 RS_{17}	9 Aug 2016	Pan-STARRS	7	✓ CEN	✗ UMP	✗	6.2	0.4	42.7	3.4	8.9	2.27	SSBN07: not a centaur MPC: Other UMP	MPC · JPL
(542889) 2013 MY11	29 Jul 2014	Pan-STARRS	111	✗ TNO	✓ CEN	✓ R	53	0.5	14.5	21.5	79.5	5.45	—	MPC · JPL
(543377) 2014 BF70	5 Jan 2014	Pan-STARRS	68	✗ TNO	✓ CEN	✓ R	88.7	0.8	11.4	11.5	159.7	4.92	—	MPC · JPL
(545293) 2011 FX62	28 Mar 2011	La Silla Obs.	203	✗ TNO	✓ CEN	✓ R	47.7	0.5	18.3	20.3	71.5	5.09	—	MPC · JPL
(547375) 2010 PC88	3 Nov 2013	S. S. Sheppard; C. Trujillo	146	✓ CEN	✓ CEN	✓ R	25.9	0.1	18	24.6	27.2	4.44	—	MPC · JPL
(548141) 2010 CD270	4 Feb 2010	Pan-STARRS	134	✓ CEN	✓ CEN	✓ R	27.3	0.1	19.6	24.9	29.7	4.49	—	MPC · JPL
(550310) 2012 DD86	19 Jan 2012	Pan-STARRS	69	✓ CEN	✓ CEN	✓ R	23.1	0.3	12.5	15.4	30.9	4.1	—	MPC · JPL
(550564) 2012 PU_{45}	17 Aug 2011	Pan-STARRS	161	✗ TNO	✗ TNO	✓ S	44.1	0.2	23.6	31.1	52.9	5.35	—	MPC · JPL
(552474) 2010 AW153	8 Jan 2010	Pan-STARRS	84	✗ TNO	✓ CEN	✓ R	43	0.5	28.7	20.1	64.6	4.49	—	MPC · JPL
(552678) 2010 JG210	10 May 2010	Pan-STARRS	106	✗ TNO	✓ CEN	✓ R	31.9	0.4	27	17.1	44.7	4.21	—	MPC · JPL
(554099) 2012 KU_{50}	18 May 2012	La Silla Obs.	221	✗ TNO	✗ TNO	✓ R	40.9	0.2	18.9	30.9	49.1	5.33	binary: ? km	MPC · JPL
(558093) 2014 WW535	23 Nov 2014	Pan-STARRS	88	✗ TNO	✓ CEN	✓ R	34.3	0.2	18.8	24	41.2	4.91	—	MPC · JPL
(558094) 2014 WX535	23 Dec 2013	Pan-STARRS	40	✓ CEN	✓ CEN	✓ R	24.4	0.5	22.9	12.3	36.5	3.68	—	MPC · JPL
(558168) 2014 XQ40	1 Apr 2016	R. L. Allen; D. James	91	✗ TNO	✓ CEN	✓ R	66.3	0.7	14.7	17.9	112.6	5.01	—	MPC · JPL
(559176) 2015 BE518	27 Jan 2015	Pan-STARRS	109	✓ CEN	✓ CEN	✓ R	29.5	0.4	16.6	16.8	42.2	4.29	—	MPC · JPL
(559177) 2015 BF518	19 Jan 2015	Pan-STARRS	58	✓ CEN	✓ CEN	✓ R	25.2	0.3	15	17.3	33	4.24	—	MPC · JPL
(559239) 2015 BF568	19 Jan 2015	Pan-STARRS	62	✓ CEN	✓ CEN	✓ R	18.3	0.3	22.4	12.3	24.3	3.56	—	MPC · JPL
(562274) 2015 XW379	8 Dec 2015	S. Hellmich; S. Mottola	226	✓ CEN	✓ CEN	✓ R	27.7	0.4	11.9	17.3	38.1	4.38	—	MPC · JPL
(566442) 2018 EZ1	7 Mar 2018	Pan-STARRS	27	✓ CEN	✓ CEN	✓ R	16.2	0.4	29.7	9.9	22.5	3.14	—	MPC · JPL
(567065) 2019 CY4	8 Feb 2019	Pan-STARRS	34	✗ TNO	✓ CEN	✓ R	46.7	0.7	19.6	10	79.4	4.14	—	MPC · JPL
(567070) 2019 GB19	7 Apr 2019	Pan-STARRS	43	✓ CEN	✓ CEN	✓ R	19.3	0.4	31.5	12.4	26.2	3.34	—	MPC · JPL
(567122) 2020 PM3	13 Aug 2020	Pan-STARRS	74	✓ CEN	✓ CEN	✓ R	20.9	0.4	35.9	12.2	29.6	3.2	—	MPC · JPL
(567129) 2021 CD4	7 Feb 2021	MLS	12	✓ CEN	✓ CEN	✓ R	11.4	0.5	19.9	5.3	17.6	2.8	SSBN07: not a centaur	MPC · JPL
(574398) 2010 LO33	20 May 2010	MLS	108	✓ CEN	✓ CEN	✓ R	23.1	0.3	17.9	15.7	30.5	4.02	—	MPC · JPL
(576162) 2012 GT41	2 Feb 2011	Pan-STARRS	68	✓ CEN	✓ CEN	✓ R	26.4	0.4	29.8	16.3	36.4	3.81	—	MPC · JPL
(576357) 2012 PV45	6 Aug 2012	Pan-STARRS	68	✓ CEN	✓ CEN	✓ R	27.9	0.4	12.3	17	38.7	4.35	—	MPC · JPL
(578559) 2014 DC143	22 Jan 2012	Pan-STARRS	48	✓ CEN	✓ CEN	✓ R	20.2	0.3	21	13.8	26.5	3.75	—	MPC · JPL
(578832) 2014 GP53	5 Apr 2014	Pan-STARRS	91	✓ CEN	✓ CEN	✓ R	26.6	0.2	14.3	21.3	32	4.49	—	MPC · JPL
(578991) 2014 JC80	1 Feb 2005	Spacewatch	34	✓ CEN	✓ CEN	✓ R	11.4	0.1	23.9	10.5	12.2	3.15	—	MPC · JPL
(578997) 2014 JR92	28 Feb 2010	Pan-STARRS	146	✗ TNO	✓ CEN	✓ R	43	0.4	28.4	25.6	60.2	4.75	—	MPC · JPL
(582301) 2015 RM306	9 Sep 2015	Pan-STARRS	34	✗ TNO	✓ CEN	✓ R	244.8	0.9	176	11.4	465.1	-5.94	—	MPC · JPL
(584778) 2017 RG16	6 Aug 2017	Pan-STARRS	30	✗ TNO	✓ CEN	✓ R	77.8	0.9	74.8	7.1	147.9	0.95	SSBN07: not a centaur	MPC · JPL
(585899) 2020 HM98	19 Apr 2020	Pan-STARRS	46	✗ TNO	✓ CEN	✓ R	84	0.8	137.9	13.2	151.2	-3.51	—	MPC · JPL
(585912) 2020 QK3	18 Aug 2020	PMO NEO	85	✗ TNO	✓ CEN	✓ R	32.5	0.5	24.4	13.4	48.7	4.1	—	MPC · JPL
(585913) 2020 QQ7	16 Aug 2020	PMO NEO	75	✗ TNO	✓ CEN	✓ R	38.6	0.6	23.7	14	61.8	4.13	—	MPC · JPL
(590218) 2011 UD63	4 Sep 2011	Pan-STARRS	97	✓ CEN	✓ CEN	✓ R	16.3	0.3	10.7	11.2	21.5	3.62	—	catalog · MPC · JPL
(591370) 2013 ME14	18 Jun 2013	Pan-STARRS	74	✗ TNO	✓ CEN	✓ R	37.6	0.4	37.4	18.9	52.6	4.05	—	catalog · MPC · JPL
(591376) 2013 NL24	14 Jul 2013	Pan-STARRS	132	✗ TNO	✓ CEN	✓ R	40.1	0.3	4.7	24.6	52.2	5.41	albedo: 0.045	catalog · MPC · JPL
(594872) 2019 CR	4 Feb 2019	Pan-STARRS	12	✓ CEN	✓ CEN	✓ R	14.5	0.6	160.3	5.9	23	-2.17	SSBN07: not a centaur	catalog · MPC · JPL
(600217) 2011 QY100	9 Oct 2010	Pan-STARRS	127	✗ TNO	✓ CEN	✓ R	167.4	0.8	26.2	19.5	301.4	6.14	—	catalog · MPC · JPL
(601690) 2013 KZ18	16 May 2013	Pan-STARRS	93	✗ TNO	✓ CEN	✓ R	34.5	0.4	35.5	18.8	48.3	3.99	—	catalog · MPC · JPL
(606357) 2017 UV_{43}	13 Mar 2005	MLS	9	✓ CEN	✗ UMP	✗	6.7	0.3	5.2	5	8.5	2.96	SSBN07: not a centaur	catalog · MPC · JPL
(606653) 2018 RR2	18 Aug 2018	Pan-STARRS	23	✓ CEN	✓ CEN	✓ R	21.6	0.6	40.2	7.7	35.5	2.62	—	MPC · JPL
(606985) 2020 OD8	21 Nov 1998	Spacewatch	13	✓ CEN	✓ CEN	✓ R	8.5	0.3	1.8	6.2	10.7	3.07	—	MPC · JPL
(606988) 2020 RR5	14 Sep 2020	Pan-STARRS	41	✓ CEN	✓ CEN	✓ R	22.7	0.5	13.2	12.2	33.2	3.84	—	MPC · JPL
(612093) 1999 LE_{31}	12 Jun 1999	LINEAR	17	✓ CEN	✗ DAM	✗	8.2	0.5	151.5	4.3	12	-1.31	SSBN07: not a centaur albedo: 0.056; BR-mag: 1.20	catalog · MPC · JPL
(612223) 2001 QF_{6}	16 Aug 2001	LINEAR	5	✓ CEN	✗ UMP	✗	7.2	0.7	24.4	2.3	12.2	2.28	SSBN07: not a centaur albedo: 0.040	catalog · MPC · JPL
(612802) 2004 QQ26	17 Aug 2004	D. J. Tholen	79	✓ CEN	✓ CEN	✓ R	23	0.1	21.5	19.6	26.4	4.1	albedo: 0.044	catalog · MPC · JPL
(612951) 2005 EB299	11 Mar 2005	M. W. Buie	101	✗ TNO	✓ CEN	✓ R	51.7	0.5	0.7	25.4	77.5	5.56	albedo: 0.083	catalog · MPC · JPL
(613214) 2005 UN524	25 Oct 2005	P. A. Wiegert	98	✓ CEN	✓ CEN	✓ R	21.5	0.1	17.8	18.7	24.2	4.08	—	catalog · MPC · JPL
(613349) 2006 BF_{208}	31 Jan 2006	CSS	7	✓ CEN	✗ UMP	✗	5.9	0.5	35.6	3	8.7	2.4	SSBN07: not a centaur	catalog · MPC · JPL
(613619) 2006 UX184	22 Oct 2006	La Palma Obs	92	✗ TNO	✓ CEN	✓ R	37.9	0.4	37.4	20.4	53	4.07	—	catalog · MPC · JPL
(613717) 2007 DP_{50}	17 Feb 2007	Spacewatch	7	✓ CEN	✗ UMP	✗	6.2	0.4	3.1	3.8	8.6	2.85	SSBN07: not a centaur	catalog · MPC · JPL
(613766) 2007 NC7	11 Jul 2007	Palomar Obs.	116	✗ TNO	✓ CEN	✓ R	34.4	0.5	6.3	17	51.6	4.58	Grey centaur BR-mag: 1.28	catalog · MPC · JPL
(614592) 2009 YS_{6}	17 Dec 2009	MLS	8	✓ CEN	✗ DAM	✗	20.2	0.9	147.8	1.6	38.7	-1.05	SSBN07: not a centaur albedo: 0.071	catalog · MPC · JPL
(636872) 2014 YX49	26 Dec 2014	Pan-STARRS	97	✓ CEN	✓ CEN	✓ R	19.1	0.3	25.6	13.7	24.4	3.59	(U:1)	catalog · MPC · JPL
(641770) 2004 RW_{141}	8 Sep 2004	LINEAR	7	✓ CEN	✗ UMP	✗	7	0.5	7.7	3.5	10.4	2.74	SSBN07: not a centaur; (U:0)	catalog · MPC · JPL
(661238) 2004 DA_{62}	25 Feb 2004	LINEAR	15	✓ CEN	✗ DAM	✗	7.7	0.5	52.3	4.1	11.2	1.99	SSBN07: not a centaur BR-mag: 1.37; (U:0); MPC: Other UMP	catalog · MPC · JPL
(661762) 2005 NP_{82}	6 Jul 2005	SSS	11	✓ CEN	✗ DAM	✗	5.9	0.5	130.5	3.1	8.7	-0.33	SSBN07: not a centaur; (U:0)	catalog · MPC · JPL
(666491) 2010 NG_{146}	12 Jul 2010	Pan-STARRS	88	✓ CEN	✓ CEN	✓ R	20.1	0.1	8.4	17.7	22.5	4.12	(U:1)	catalog · MPC · JPL
(666802) 2010 UU_{110}	31 Oct 2010	Pan-STARRS	106	✓ CEN	✓ CEN	✓ R	22.4	0.2	26.8	17.1	27.7	3.83	(U:2)	catalog · MPC · JPL
(670321) 2013 NT_{33}	7 Jul 2013	Pan-STARRS	91	✓ CEN	✓ CEN	✓ R	29.9	0.5	20.4	16.4	43.3	4.18	(U:3)	catalog · MPC · JPL
(671088) 2014 FB_{72}	16 Mar 2014	Pan-STARRS	106	✓ CEN	✓ CEN	✓ R	23.8	0.3	17	15.6	32	4.06	(U:1)	catalog · MPC · JPL
(672844) 2014 WV_{535}	22 Nov 2014	Pan-STARRS	56	✓ CEN	✓ CEN	✓ R	21.1	0.4	30.3	12.4	29.8	3.41	(U:1)	catalog · MPC · JPL
(677445) 2016 UE_{179}	26 Oct 2016	Pan-STARRS	17	✓ CEN	✓ CEN	✗	11.5	0.4	6.3	6.8	16.2	3.15	(U:9)	catalog · MPC · JPL
(679338) 2019 AB_{7}	8 Jan 2019	Pan-STARRS	70	✓ CEN	✓ CEN	✓ R	26.8	0.2	12.1	20.3	33.3	4.5	(U:1)	catalog · MPC · JPL
(679399) 2019 CJ_{3}	8 Feb 2019	ZTF	97	✓ CEN	✓ CEN	✓ R	21.6	0.2	39.7	16.8	26.4	3.3	(U:2)	catalog · MPC · JPL
(679828) 2021 DB_{17}	16 Feb 2021	Pan-STARRS	27	✓ CEN	n.a.	✓ R	19.1	0.4	7.5	12.3	25.9	3.82	(U:2)	catalog · MPC · JPL
(679837) 2021 GD_{9}	7 Apr 2021	Pan-STARRS	48	✓ CEN	✓ CEN	✓ R	15.6	0.3	16.1	11.1	20	3.52	(U:3)	catalog · MPC · JPL
(687170) 2011 QF99	29 Aug 2011	M. Alexandersen	61	✓ CEN	✓ CEN	✓ R	19.1	0.2	10.8	15.7	22.4	3.98	(U:1)	catalog · MPC · JPL
696315 Petraios	4 Apr 2016	MLS	80	✓ CEN	✓ CEN	✓ R	20.1	0.1	14.2	18.6	21.7	4.06	(U:2)	catalog · MPC · JPL
(698876) 2019 AJ_{16}	14 Jan 2019	Pan-STARRS	25	✓ CEN	✓ CEN	✓ R	11.5	0.2	10.7	9.1	13.9	3.31	(U:2)	catalog · MPC · JPL
(699673) 2020 RE_{7}	12 Sep 2020	Pan-STARRS	30	✓ CEN	✓ CEN	✓ R	19.1	0.3	8.2	13.2	25.1	3.88	(U:3)	catalog · MPC · JPL
(773721) 2020 YR3	17 Dec 2020	MLS	77	✗ TNO	✓ CEN	✓ R	479.6	0.9	169.3	16.4	911.2	-8.21	—	MPC · JPL
(847109) 2021 PU23	7 Aug 2021	Pan-STARRS	54	✓ CEN	✓ CEN	✓ S	15.6	0.1	37.1	13.5	17.7	3.07	(U:3)	MPC · JPL
1994 TA	2 Oct 1994	J. Chen; D. C. Jewitt	28	✓ CEN	✓ CEN	✓ R	16.7	0.3	5.4	11.6	21.8	3.71	Red centaur BR-mag: 1.98; taxonomy: RR; (U:2)	MPC · JPL
1996 AR_{20}	12 Jan 1996	A. Gleason	9	✓ CEN	✓ CEN	✗	15.3	0.6	6.2	5.7	24.9	2.99	SSBN07: not a centaur; (U:7)	MPC · JPL
1996 AS_{20}	14 Jan 1996	Spacewatch	77	✗ TNO	✓ CEN	✗	35.8	0.6	10.6	13.5	57.2	4.27	—	MPC · JPL
1996 RX_{33}	8 Sep 1996	Spacewatch	77	✓ CEN	✓ CEN	✓ R	23.9	0.2	9.4	19	28.7	4.36	(U:E)	MPC · JPL
1997 MD_{10}	29 Jun 1997	LINEAR	4	✓ CEN	✗ DAM	✗	26.5	0.9	59.3	1.5	51.5	0.96	SSBN07: not a centaur; (U:1)	MPC · JPL
1998 QJ_{1}	17 Aug 1998	LINEAR	2.9	✓ CEN	✗ UMP	✗	11.2	0.8	23.7	2.1	20.4	2.02	SSBN07: not a centaur; (U:3); MPC: Other UMP	MPC · JPL
1998 WU_{24}	25 Nov 1998	LINEAR	6	✓ CEN	✗ DAM	✗	15.1	0.9	42.5	1.4	28.9	1.4	SSBN07: not a centaur BR-mag: 1.31; (U:3)	MPC · JPL
1999 CW_{118}	10 Feb 1999	Mauna Kea Obs.	95	✗ TNO	✗ CLS?	✓ R	43.5	0	0.8	43.4	43.5	5.9	—	MPC · JPL
1999 HD_{12}	17 Apr 1999	M. W. Buie; R. L. Millis	15	✓ CEN	✓ CEN	✗	21.5	0.6	10.1	8.9	34	3.49	(U:8)	MPC · JPL
1999 JV_{127}	10 May 1999	Cerro Tololo Obs.	46	✓ CEN	✓ CEN	✗	16.7	0.4	25.5	10.7	22.7	3.33	(U:E)	MPC · JPL
2000 CO_{104}	6 Feb 2000	M. W. Buie	56	✓ CEN	✓ CEN	✓ R	24.1	0.1	3.1	20.6	27.5	4.47	(U:2)	MPC · JPL
2000 DG_{8}	25 Feb 2000	LINEAR	16	✓ CEN	✗ DAM	✗	10.8	0.8	129.3	2.2	19.3	-0.63	SSBN07: not a centaur albedo: 0.053; (U:2); MPC: Other UMP	catalog MPC · JPL
2000 FZ_{53}	31 Mar 2000	S. S. Sheppard; D. C. Jewitt; C. Trujillo	29	✓ CEN	✓ CEN	✓ R	23.8	0.5	34.9	12.5	35.1	3.3	Grey centaur BR-mag: 1.17; (U:2)	MPC · JPL
2000 GM_{137}	2 Apr 2000	S. S. Sheppard; D. C. Jewitt; C. Trujillo	9	✓ CEN	✓ CEN	✓ R	7.8	0.1	15.9	6.9	8.8	3.01	SSBN07: not a centaur albedo: 0.043; (U:1)	MPC · JPL
2000 HE_{46}	29 Apr 2000	LONEOS	6	✓ CEN	✗ DAM	✗	23.7	0.9	158.6	2.4	45	-1.51	SSBN07: not a centaur albedo: 0.045; BR-mag: 1.42; (U:2); MPC: Other UMP	MPC · JPL
2000 PL_{30}	5 Aug 2000	M. J. Holman	138	✗ TNO	✗ TNO	✓ R	42.3	0.2	5.8	32.3	50.7	5.68	—	MPC · JPL
2000 SQ_{331}	23 Sep 2000	Mauna Kea Obs.	40	✗ TNO	✓ CEN	✗	69.8	0.7	5.4	20.4	118.7	5.28	—	MPC · JPL
2000 SU_{314}	28 Sep 2000	LINEAR	4	✓ CEN	✗ UMP	✗	9.1	0.7	20.5	2.3	15.9	2.22	SSBN07: not a centaur; (U:9)	MPC · JPL
2000 YY_{1}	17 Dec 2000	M. J. Holman; B. Gladman; T. Grav	212	✗ TNO	✓ CEN	✗	63	0.5	7.9	29.8	94.6	6.05	—	MPC · JPL
2001 FK_{194}	22 Mar 2001	Kitt Peak Obs.	92	✗ TNO	✓ CEN	✗	76.3	0.6	8.8	28	122.1	6.12	—	MPC · JPL
2001 XZ_{255}	11 Dec 2001	J. Kleyna; S. S. Sheppard; D. C. Jewitt	34	✓ CEN	✓ CEN	✓ R	15.9	0	2.6	15.3	16.5	3.82	Red centaur BR-mag: 2.04; (U:3)	MPC · JPL
2001 YK_{61}	18 Dec 2001	LINEAR	11	✓ CEN	✗ UMP	✗	10.6	0.7	12.4	3.3	17.9	2.51	SSBN07: not a centaur; (U:3); MPC: Other UMP	MPC · JPL
2002 CA_{249}	6 Feb 2002	Kitt Peak Obs.	22	✓ CEN	✓ CEN	✗	20.7	0.4	6.4	12.7	28.7	3.91	(U:E)	MPC · JPL
2002 CB_{249}	7 Feb 2002	M. W. Buie	58	✓ CEN	✓ CEN	✓ R	26.6	0.5	16.2	12.2	40.9	3.85	(U:5)	MPC · JPL
2002 FY_{36}	18 Mar 2002	M. W. Buie	109	✗ TNO	✓ CEN	✓ R	32	0.2	5.4	22.5	38.4	5	—	MPC · JPL
2002 PQ_{152}	12 Aug 2002	M. W. Buie	80	✓ CEN	✓ CEN	✓ R	25.9	0.2	9.3	20.9	30.8	4.52	Red centaur BR-mag: 1.85; (U:1)	MPC · JPL
2002 PR_{170}	5 Aug 2002	Mauna Kea Obs.	153	✗ TNO	✓ CEN	✓ R	75.4	0.8	1	11.3	135.7	4.64	—	MPC · JPL
2002 TK_{301}	6 Oct 2002	Mauna Kea Obs.	12	✓ CEN	✓ CEN	✗	16.1	0.1	24.4	14	18.2	3.5	(U:E)	MPC · JPL
2002 TT_{351}	10 Oct 2002	SDSS	12	✓ CEN	✓ CEN	✓ R	7.1	0.1	8.8	6.4	7.9	3.03	SSBN07: not a centaur; (U:0)	MPC · JPL
2002 VG_{131}	9 Nov 2002	Kitt Peak Obs.	31	✓ CEN	✓ CEN	✗	19.1	0.3	21.2	12.5	25.7	3.63	(U:)	MPC · JPL
2003 CC_{22}	8 Feb 2003	Mauna Kea Obs.	17	✓ CEN	✗ UMP	✗	7.3	0.4	6.4	4.2	10.4	2.84	SSBN07: not a centaur; (U:1); MPC: Other UMP	MPC · JPL
2003 FH_{129}	30 Mar 2003	M. W. Buie	122	✗ TNO	✓ CEN	✓ R	70.1	0.6	18.8	27.5	112.1	5.63	—	MPC · JPL
2003 HM_{57}	26 Apr 2003	Mauna Kea Obs.	116	✗ TNO	✓ CEN	✓ R	42.7	0.6	10.8	13.4	68.2	4.62	—	MPC · JPL
2003 KQ_{20}	30 May 2003	Cerro Tololo Obs.	13	✓ CEN	✓ CEN	✗	10.6	0.2	5.7	8.5	12.6	3.27	(U:E)	MPC · JPL
2003 LH_{7}	1 Jun 2003	Cerro Tololo Obs.	18	✓ CEN	✓ CEN	✗	17	0.3	21.2	12	21.9	3.53	(U:E)	MPC · JPL
2003 QC_{112}	24 Aug 2003	M. W. Buie	101	✓ CEN	✓ CEN	✓ R	20.6	0.3	18.2	15	26.2	3.89	(U:2)	MPC · JPL
2003 QD_{112}	26 Aug 2003	M. W. Buie	40	✓ CEN	✓ CEN	✓ R	19.1	0.6	14.5	8	30.2	3.29	(U:1)	MPC · JPL
2003 QM_{112}	29 Aug 2003	Mauna Kea Obs.	8	✗ TNO	✓ CEN	✓ R	83.4	0.8	16.4	13.1	150.1	4.67	—	MPC · JPL
2003 QN_{112}	29 Aug 2003	Mauna Kea Obs.	15	✓ CEN	✓ CEN	✓ R	25.1	0.3	7.9	16.7	33.5	4.31	(U:)	MPC · JPL
2003 QO_{112}	29 Aug 2003	Mauna Kea Obs.	23	✗ TNO	✓ CEN	✓ R	33.3	0.5	7	16.5	50	4.51	—	MPC · JPL
2003 QP_{112}	29 Aug 2003	Mauna Kea Obs.	16	✓ CEN	✓ CEN	✓ R	21.1	0.3	31.2	14.2	28.1	3.5	(U:)	MPC · JPL
2003 UC_{414}	30 Oct 2003	Cerro Tololo Obs.	122	✗ TNO	✓ CEN	✓ R	44.9	0.6	25.9	16.3	71.9	4.35	—	MPC · JPL
2003 UY_{283}	18 Oct 2003	LPL/Spacewatch II	5	✗ TNO	✓ CEN	✗	33.5	0.8	18.9	3.5	60.2	3.03	SSBN07: not a centaur	MPC · JPL
2003 UY_{292}	23 Oct 2003	Kitt Peak Obs.	51	✓ CEN	✓ CEN	✓ R	21.9	0.3	8.6	15.9	27.8	4.14	(U:E)	MPC · JPL
2003 WN_{188}	29 Nov 2003	CSS	10	✓ CEN	✗ DAM	✗	14.4	0.8	26.9	2.2	26.6	1.95	SSBN07: not a centaur albedo: 0.050; BR-mag: 1.26; (U:1); MPC: Other UMP	MPC · JPL
2004 CJ_{39}	14 Feb 2004	Spacewatch	11	✓ CEN	✓ CEN	✓ R	12.9	0.5	3.6	6.7	19	3.16	(U:1)	MPC · JPL
2004 CM_{111}	13 Feb 2004	Spacewatch	8	✗ TNO	✓ CEN	✗	33.2	0.8	4.7	4.9	59.7	3.18	—	MPC · JPL
2004 KV18	24 May 2004	P. A. Wiegert	92	✗ TNO	✓ CEN	✓ R	30.3	0.1	13.6	24.7	33.3	4.84	—	catalog MPC · JPL
2004 LB_{33}	9 Jun 2004	Mauna Kea Obs.	111	✗ TNO	✓ CEN	✗	33.1	0.2	4.5	25.7	39.7	5.08	—	MPC · JPL
2004 LE_{33}	9 Jun 2004	Mauna Kea Obs.	98	✗ TNO	✓ CEN	✗	32.6	0.1	5.7	26.1	35.9	5.12	—	MPC · JPL
2004 LR_{31}	6 Jun 2004	NEAT	84	✓ CEN	✓ CEN	✓ R	20.4	0.3	16.7	14.7	26.2	3.9	(U:1)	MPC · JPL
2004 LX_{32}	9 Jun 2004	Mauna Kea Obs.	126	✗ TNO	✓ CEN	✗	65.7	0.7	4.8	14.6	111.8	5.14	—	MPC · JPL
2004 MK_{10}	22 Jun 2004	Mauna Kea Obs.	139	✗ TNO	✓ CEN	✗	86.4	0.6	8.8	27.2	138.2	6.5	—	MPC · JPL
2004 MM_{10}	23 Jun 2004	Mauna Kea Obs.	201	✗ TNO	✓ CEN	✗	42.5	0.3	1	26.3	55.3	5.58	—	MPC · JPL
2004 MO_{10}	22 Jun 2004	Mauna Kea Obs.	132	✗ TNO	✓ CEN	✗	30.5	0.3	8.2	20.5	39.6	4.74	—	MPC · JPL
2004 MW_{8}	24 Jun 2004	CFEPS	106	✗ TNO	✓ CEN	✓ R	33.9	0.3	8.2	22.3	44	4.97	—	MPC · JPL
2004 PY_{117}	15 Aug 2004	CFEPS	153	✗ TNO	✗ TNO	✓ R	40.5	0.2	23.3	28.8	48.5	5.15	—	MPC · JPL
2004 TE_{282}	15 Oct 2004	M. W. Buie	122	✗ TNO	✓ CEN	✓ R	34.4	0.1	20.7	29	37.8	4.94	—	MPC · JPL
2004 TU_{357}	15 Oct 2004	Kitt Peak Obs.	140	✗ TNO	✓ CEN	✗	43.3	0.3	7.1	27.3	56.3	5.58	—	MPC · JPL
2004 TZ_{387}	13 Oct 2004	Spacewatch	3.0	✓ CEN	✗	✓ R	7	0.2	5.1	5.4	8.7	2.99	SSBN07: not a centaur; (U:2)	MPC · JPL
2004 VH_{131}	9 Nov 2004	CFEPS	64	✗ TNO	✓ CEN	✓ R	60.5	0.6	12	22.2	96.8	5.42	—	MPC · JPL
2004 VM_{131}	9 Nov 2004	CFEPS	116	✗ TNO	✓ CEN	✓ R	68.9	0.7	14	20.5	117.1	5.12	—	MPC · JPL
2004 VP_{112}	9 Nov 2004	Mauna Kea Obs.	6	✓ CEN	✓ CEN	✗	8.7	0	6.9	8.3	9.1	3.16	(U:E)	MPC · JPL
2004 VT_{130}	9 Nov 2004	Mauna Kea Obs.	4	✓ CEN	✓ CEN	✗	9	0.1	18.3	8	10.1	3.06	(U:E)	MPC · JPL
2004 XQ_{190}	12 Dec 2004	Mauna Kea Obs.	22	✓ CEN	✓ CEN	✗	23.1	0	6.3	22.8	23.3	4.41	(U:E)	MPC · JPL
2005 GH_{228}	5 Apr 2005	CFEPS	111	✗ TNO	✓ CEN	✓ S	36.4	0.1	17.2	29.7	40.1	5.17	—	MPC · JPL
2005 HL_{3}	19 Apr 2005	SSS	8	✓ CEN	✗ DAM	✗	11.3	0.8	35.6	1.9	20.7	1.8	SSBN07: not a centaur; (U:1); MPC: Other UMP	MPC · JPL
2005 PF_{26}	5 Aug 2005	Mauna Kea Obs.	2.4	✓ CEN	✗ DAM	✗	13.5	0.9	23.2	1.5	25.6	1.72	SSBN07: not a centaur; (U:9)	MPC · JPL
2005 SB_{223}	30 Sep 2005	SSS	9	✓ CEN	✗ DAM	✗	29.4	0.9	91.6	2.8	56	0.12	SSBN07: not a centaur; (U:1); MPC: Other UMP	MPC · JPL
2005 TH_{173}	8 Oct 2005	LCO	25	✓ CEN	✓ CEN	✓ R	19.8	0.3	13.5	13.7	25.9	3.87	(U:4)	MPC · JPL
2005 TJ_{50}	5 Oct 2005	Spacewatch	5	✓ CEN	✗ DAM	✗	9.1	0.6	110.3	3.8	14.5	-0.18	SSBN07: not a centaur; (U:6); MPC: Other UMP	MPC · JPL
2005 UH_{525}	27 Oct 2005	Mauna Kea Obs.	1.2	✓ CEN	✗ DAM	✗	17.8	0.9	14.2	1.6	33.9	1.79	SSBN07: not a centaur; (U:9)	MPC · JPL
2005 VB_{123}	3 Nov 2005	Kitt Peak Obs.	51	✓ CEN	✓ CEN	✗	17.7	0	38.9	17.6	17.9	3.17	(U:E)	MPC · JPL
2006 AA_{99}	5 Jan 2006	Mauna Kea Obs.	23	✓ CEN	✓ CEN	✗	26.9	0	33.4	25.6	28.1	3.98	(U:E)	MPC · JPL
2006 AO_{101}	5 Jan 2006	Mauna Kea Obs.	158	✗ TNO	✗ TNO	✓ R	52.9	0.2	1.1	41.9	63.5	6.35	—	MPC · JPL
2006 BZ_{8}	23 Jan 2006	CSS	9	✓ CEN	✗ DAM	✗	9.6	0.8	165.3	1.9	17.3	-1.03	SSBN07: not a centaur; (U:0); MPC: Other UMP	MPC · JPL
2006 FV_{4}	23 Mar 2006	LINEAR	15	✓ CEN	✗ UMP	✗	10.8	0.7	32	3.3	18.3	2.23	SSBN07: not a centaur; (U:1); MPC: Other UMP	MPC · JPL
2006 HG_{123}	26 Apr 2006	Cerro Tololo Obs.	150	✗ TNO	✗ PLU?	✓ R	39.5	0	23.9	36.2	39.5	5.17	—	MPC · JPL
2006 HS_{122}	26 Apr 2006	Cerro Tololo Obs.	184	✗ TNO	✓ CEN	✗	45	0.3	4.3	28.2	58.5	5.71	—	MPC · JPL
2006 JG_{57}	14 May 2006	NEAT	20	✓ CEN	✗ DAM	✗	9.6	0.5	56.9	4.8	14.5	1.82	SSBN07: not a centaur; (U:2); MPC: Other UMP	MPC · JPL
2006 QG_{181}	21 Aug 2006	Cerro Tololo Obs.	88	✗ TNO	✓ CEN	✓ R	57.9	0.6	7.2	20.3	92.7	5.39	—	MPC · JPL
2006 QP_{180}	28 Aug 2006	A. C. Becker; A. W. Puckett; J. Kubica	67	✗ TNO	✓ CEN	✓ R	38.5	0.6	5	13.2	61.5	4.47	—	MPC · JPL
2006 RG_{1}	1 Sep 2006	SSS	5	✓ CEN	✗ DAM	✗	25.7	0.9	133.5	2	49.4	-0.99	SSBN07: not a centaur; (U:1); MPC: Other UMP	MPC · JPL
2006 RJ_{2}	14 Sep 2006	CSS	4	✓ CEN	✗ DAM	✗	9.8	0.8	164.7	2.3	17.3	-1.18	SSBN07: not a centaur; (U:5); MPC: Other UMP	MPC · JPL
2006 SO_{134}	19 Sep 2006	Spacewatch	3	✓ CEN	✗ UMP	✗	19.5	0.8	4.2	3.3	35.8	2.41	SSBN07: not a centaur; (U:3); MPC: Other UMP	MPC · JPL
2006 UT_{321}	19 Oct 2006	Kitt Peak Obs.	73	✗ TNO	✓ CEN	✗	38.7	0.2	5.4	28.5	46.4	5.45	—	MPC · JPL
2006 VD_{79}	12 Nov 2006	MLS	7	✓ CEN	✗ DAM	✗	6	0.6	70.6	2.7	9.4	1.46	SSBN07: not a centaur; (U:9)	MPC · JPL
2007 BP102	24 Jan 2007	Mauna Kea Obs.	42	✓ CEN	✓ CEN	✓ R	23.9	0.3	64.8	17.8	30	1.98	(U:1)	MPC · JPL
2007 HU_{45}	18 Apr 2007	MLS	4	✓ CEN	✗ UMP	✗	6.8	0.5	6	3.4	10.2	2.73	SSBN07: not a centaur; (U:5); MPC: Other UMP	MPC · JPL
2007 RH_{167}	10 Sep 2007	Spacewatch	3	✓ CEN	✗ UMP	✗	6.8	0.8	2.1	1.6	12	2.24	SSBN07: not a centaur; (U:9)	MPC · JPL
2007 SA_{24}	25 Sep 2007	MLS	6	✓ CEN	✗ UMP	✗	6.3	0.6	17.1	2.7	9.9	2.56	SSBN07: not a centaur; (U:3); MPC: Other UMP	MPC · JPL
2007 TB_{434}	14 Oct 2007	Mauna Kea Obs.	6	✓ CEN	✓ CEN	✗	8.7	0	9.8	8.5	8.9	3.15	(U:E)	MPC · JPL
2007 TG_{250}	11 Oct 2007	MLS	2.4	✓ CEN	✗ DAM	✗	21.3	0.9	10.6	1.6	41	1.74	SSBN07: not a centaur; (U:9)	MPC · JPL
2007 TJ_{422}	6 Oct 2007	A. C. Becker; A. W. Puckett; J. Kubica	31	✓ CEN	✓ CEN	✓ R	19.6	0.5	2.9	9.3	29.9	3.56	Red centaur BR-mag: 1.74; (U:1)	MPC · JPL
2007 TR_{436}	14 Oct 2007	Mauna Kea Obs.	70	✗ TNO	✓ CEN	✗	63	0.5	31.7	25.4	94.5	5.21	—	MPC · JPL
2007 TU_{431}	14 Oct 2007	Mauna Kea Obs.	46	✗ TNO	✓ CEN	✗	126.6	0.8	6.7	21.4	228	5.92	—	MPC · JPL
2007 VH_{305}	4 Nov 2007	A. C. Becker; A. W. Puckett; J. Kubica	24	✓ CEN	✓ CEN	✓ R	24.1	0.7	6.2	8.1	40	3.42	Grey centaur albedo: 0.070; BR-mag: 1.18; taxonomy: BR; (U:0)	MPC · JPL
2007 VJ_{200}	9 Nov 2007	MLS	1.0	✓ CEN	✗ DAM	✗	24.3	0.9	7.2	1.4	47.2	1.66	SSBN07: not a centaur; (U:9)	MPC · JPL
2007 VU_{259}	15 Nov 2007	MLS	1.3	✓ CEN	✗ UMP	✗	5.8	0.7	9.3	1.8	9.8	2.41	SSBN07: not a centaur; (U:9)	MPC · JPL
2008 AU_{138}	8 Jan 2008	Mauna Kea Obs.	254	✗ TNO	✓ CEN	✓ R	32.3	0.3	42.8	20	42	3.65	—	MPC · JPL
2008 CQ_{31}	2 Feb 2008	Spacewatch	2.6	✓ CEN	✗ UMP	✗	5.6	0.7	25.1	1.8	9.3	2.32	SSBN07: not a centaur; (U:9)	MPC · JPL
2008 EG_{144}	11 Mar 2008	La Silla Obs.	1.3	✓ CEN	✗ UMP	✗	5.8	0.7	1.3	1.5	10	2.31	SSBN07: not a centaur; (U:9)	MPC · JPL
2008 HY_{21}	26 Apr 2008	MLS	24	✓ CEN	✓ CEN	✓ R	11	0.5	12	5.4	16.5	2.93	SSBN07: not a centaur albedo: 0.044; (U:0)	MPC · JPL
2008 JS_{14}	6 May 2008	SSS	14	✓ CEN	✗ UMP	✗	11.6	0.7	26.2	3	20.2	2.24	SSBN07: not a centaur albedo: 0.044; (U:1); MPC: Other UMP	MPC · JPL
2008 LC_{18}	7 Jun 2008	Mauna Kea Obs.	100	✓ CEN	✗	✗ 1:1	30.1	0.1	27.5	27.7	32.5	4.43	(U:4)	MPC · JPL
2008 LD_{18}	7 Jun 2008	Mauna Kea Obs.	91	✗ TNO	✗ TNO	✓ R	40.2	0.3	14.6	27.9	52.3	5.26	—	MPC · JPL
2008 OM_{4}	28 Jul 2008	MLS	1.6	✓ CEN	✗ UMP	✗	7.7	0.8	12.1	1.7	13.6	2.16	SSBN07: not a centaur; (U:9)	MPC · JPL
2008 RG_{167}	6 Sep 2008	MLS	13	✓ CEN	✓ CEN	✓ R	16.8	0.6	8.3	6.2	27.3	3.07	(U:1)	MPC · JPL
2008 SE_{82}	24 Sep 2008	MLS	6	✓ CEN	✗ UMP	✗	19.4	0.8	17.4	3.2	35.6	2.29	SSBN07: not a centaur; (U:3); MPC: Other UMP	MPC · JPL
2008 UZ_{331}	26 Oct 2008	Cerro Tololo Obs.	73	✓ CEN	✓ CEN	✗	18.4	0	32.6	17.7	19	3.45	(U:E)	MPC · JPL
2008 WA_{95}	30 Nov 2008	LINEAR	2.6	✓ CEN	✗ DAM	✗	14	0.9	60.3	1.7	26.3	1.15	SSBN07: not a centaur; (U:4); MPC: Other UMP	MPC · JPL
2008 WT_{11}	18 Nov 2008	CSS	8	✓ CEN	✗ UMP	✗	9.8	0.6	7.1	3.8	15.9	2.67	SSBN07: not a centaur; (U:2); MPC: Other UMP	MPC · JPL
2008 YD_{112}	31 Dec 2008	Spacewatch	1.0	✓ CEN	✗ UMP	✗	5.7	0.7	10.2	1.7	9.7	2.39	SSBN07: not a centaur; (U:9)	MPC · JPL
2009 AU_{16}	6 Jan 2009	SSS	4	✓ CEN	✗ DAM	✗	23.5	0.9	70	1.9	45.1	0.8	SSBN07: not a centaur; (U:1); MPC: Other UMP	MPC · JPL
2009 BL_{80}	31 Jan 2009	LINEAR	3	✓ CEN	✗ UMP	✗	6.2	0.6	8.9	2.2	10.2	2.48	SSBN07: not a centaur; (U:3); MPC: Other UMP	MPC · JPL
2009 DP_{2}	17 Feb 2009	Chante-Perdrix Obs.	9	✓ CEN	✗ UMP	✗	6.7	0.4	27	3.9	9.5	2.61	SSBN07: not a centaur; (U:)	MPC · JPL
2009 FW_{23}	19 Mar 2009	SSS	5	✓ CEN	✗ DAM	✗	11.5	0.9	86.4	1.7	21.4	0.55	SSBN07: not a centaur; (U:3); MPC: Other UMP	MPC · JPL
2009 JX_{18}	14 May 2009	Mauna Kea Obs.	61	✗ TNO	✓ CEN	✗	37.6	0.4	20.2	20.1	52.6	4.76	—	MPC · JPL
2009 KK_{31}	25 May 2009	Mauna Kea Obs.	2.1	✓ CEN	✗ DAM	✗	20.1	0.9	22.8	1.5	38.6	1.65	SSBN07: not a centaur; (U:9)	MPC · JPL
2009 KQ_{20}	29 May 2009	MLS	2.7	✓ CEN	✗ UMP	✗	5.6	0.7	23.6	1.5	9.8	2.21	SSBN07: not a centaur; (U:9)	MPC · JPL
2009 KT_{36}	20 May 2009	Mauna Kea Obs.	97	✗ TNO	✓ CEN	✗	43.4	0.3	29.7	27.5	56.5	4.91	—	MPC · JPL
2009 KY_{36}	27 May 2009	Mauna Kea Obs.	84	✗ TNO	✓ CEN	✗	51.2	0.4	24.7	27.6	71.7	5.33	—	MPC · JPL
2009 KZ_{36}	27 May 2009	Mauna Kea Obs.	48	✗ TNO	✓ CEN	✗	48.4	0.5	17.4	20	72.6	5.15	—	MPC · JPL
2009 ME_{10}	27 Jun 2009	A. Udalski; S. S. Sheppard; M. Szymanski; C. Trujillo	124	✓ CEN	✓ CEN	✓ R	29.3	0.2	14.5	22.2	36.4	4.64	(U:2)	MPC · JPL
2009 MF_{10}	27 Jun 2009	S. S. Sheppard; A. Udalski; C. Trujillo; K. Ulaczyk	335	✗ TNO	✓ CEN	✓ R	57.9	0.5	26.1	27.5	86.8	5.28	—	MPC · JPL
2009 QY_{6}	17 Aug 2009	LINEAR	12	✓ CEN	✗ DAM	✗	12.5	0.8	137.9	2.1	22.9	-0.85	SSBN07: not a centaur albedo: 0.015; (U:1); MPC: Other UMP	MPC · JPL
2009 SC_{315}	19 Sep 2009	LPL/Spacewatch II	1.5	✓ CEN	✗ UMP	✗	7.9	0.8	2.1	1.8	14	2.21	SSBN07: not a centaur; (U:9)	MPC · JPL
2009 SD_{32}	16 Sep 2009	MLS	1.2	✓ CEN	✗ UMP	✗	5.7	0.7	5	1.6	9.8	2.35	SSBN07: not a centaur; (U:9)	MPC · JPL
2009 SE_{8}	16 Sep 2009	MLS	4	✓ CEN	✗ DAM	✗	13.3	0.9	18	1.3	25.2	1.71	SSBN07: not a centaur; (U:9)	MPC · JPL
2009 SP_{64}	17 Sep 2009	MLS	1.7	✓ CEN	✗ UMP	✗	6.8	0.7	4.4	1.8	11.8	2.3	SSBN07: not a centaur; (U:9)	MPC · JPL
2009 UW_{112}	26 Oct 2009	MLS	2.5	✓ CEN	✗ DAM	✗	7.5	0.8	25.3	1.4	13.5	1.96	SSBN07: not a centaur; (U:9)	MPC · JPL
2009 XM_{26}	8 Dec 2009	Pan-STARRS	146	✗ TNO	✓ CEN	✓ R	43.2	0.4	21.6	25.1	60.5	5.03	—	MPC · JPL
2010 AK_{111}	13 Jan 2010	WISE	1	✓ CEN	✗ UMP	✗	10.7	0.8	26.3	2.2	19.2	2.06	SSBN07: not a centaur; (U:9)	MPC · JPL
2010 BD_{15}	16 Jan 2010	WISE	6	✓ CEN	✗ UMP	✗	5.9	0.5	5.5	3.1	8.6	2.75	SSBN07: not a centaur albedo: 0.028; (U:2)	MPC · JPL
2010 BK118	30 Jan 2010	WISE	46	✗ TNO	✓ CEN	✓ R	385.1	0.9	144	6.1	731.7	-6.05	Grey centaur SSBN07: not a centaur albedo: 0.068; BR-mag: 1.32	MPC · JPL
2010 BL_{4}	18 Jan 2010	D. Rabinowitz	16	✓ CEN	✓ CEN	✓ R	18.6	0.5	20.8	8.6	28.5	3.26	Grey centaur albedo: 0.114; BR-mag: 1.25; (U:1)	MPC · JPL
2010 CQ_{140}	14 Feb 2010	WISE	3	✓ CEN	✗ UMP	✗	6	0.5	39.2	3.2	8.8	2.33	SSBN07: not a centaur; (U:)	MPC · JPL
2010 CR_{140}	14 Feb 2010	WISE	7	✓ CEN	✗ DAM	✗	5.6	0.4	74.6	3.3	8	1.43	SSBN07: not a centaur albedo: 0.023; (U:0)	MPC · JPL
2010 CV_{173}	9 Feb 2010	MLS	0.7	✓ CEN	✗ UMP	✗	6	0.8	0.4	1.5	10.5	2.29	SSBN07: not a centaur; (U:9)	MPC · JPL
2010 DF_{106}	21 Feb 2010	Pan-STARRS	134	✗ TNO	✓ CEN	✓ R	30.3	0.1	28.8	25.7	33.3	4.38	—	MPC · JPL
2010 EB_{46}	12 Mar 2010	CSS	0.8	✓ CEN	✗ DAM	✗	23.8	0.9	156.2	1.5	46.1	-1.14	SSBN07: not a centaur; (U:4)	MPC · JPL
2010 EE_{21}	1 Mar 2010	WISE	3	✓ CEN	✗ UMP	✗	8.5	0.6	36.1	3.2	13.7	2.23	SSBN07: not a centaur; (U:7); MPC: Other UMP	MPC · JPL
2010 EJ_{104}	10 Mar 2010	XuYi Stn.	3	✓ CEN	✗ DAM	✗	21.6	0.9	41.4	2.2	41	1.57	SSBN07: not a centaur albedo: 0.033; (U:1)	MPC · JPL
2010 ER_{144}	1 Mar 2010	WISE	1	✓ CEN	✗ UMP	✗	10.9	0.8	8.8	1.9	19.9	2.08	SSBN07: not a centaur; (U:9)	MPC · JPL
2010 ES_{65}	12 Mar 2010	D. Rabinowitz; S. Tourtellotte	27	✓ CEN	✓ CEN	✓ R	21.6	0.6	10.4	9.5	33.7	3.56	albedo: 0.049; (U:0)	MPC · JPL
2010 EU65	13 Mar 2010	D. Rabinowitz; S. Tourtellotte	84	✓ CEN	✓ CEN	✓ R	19.9	0.1	14.6	17	22.9	4.01	(U:2)	MPC · JPL
2010 EV_{159}	15 Mar 2010	WISE	1	✓ CEN	✗ DAM	✗	23	0.9	18.6	1.7	44.4	1.73	SSBN07: not a centaur; (U:9)	MPC · JPL
2010 FH_{92}	17 Mar 2010	WISE	28	✓ CEN	✓ CEN	✓ R	24.5	0.8	61.8	5.8	43.2	1.54	SSBN07: not a centaur albedo: 0.047; (U:1)	MPC · JPL
2010 FY_{125}	18 Mar 2010	WISE	1	✓ CEN	✗ UMP	✗	7.6	0.7	15.3	2.4	12.7	2.39	SSBN07: not a centaur; (U:9)	MPC · JPL
2010 GW_{147}	14 Apr 2010	WISE	16	✗ TNO	✓ CEN	✓ S	176.6	0.9	99.9	5.3	335.5	-0.84	SSBN07: not a centaur albedo: 0.037; MPC: Other UMP	MPC · JPL
2010 GX_{34}	9 Apr 2010	D. Rabinowitz; S. Tourtellotte	106	✓ CEN	✓ CEN	✓ R	29	0.4	11.5	16.6	41.4	4.36	(U:0)	MPC · JPL
2010 HK_{126}	23 Apr 2010	WISE	1	✓ CEN	✗ DAM	✗	16.5	0.8	121.9	2.8	30.3	-0.73	SSBN07: not a centaur; (U:2)	MPC · JPL
2010 HM_{23}	20 Apr 2010	S. S. Sheppard	36	✓ CEN	✓ CEN	✗	28	0.5	5.6	13.9	42.2	4.18	(U:9)	MPC · JPL
2010 JA_{191}	8 May 2010	WISE	1	✓ CEN	✗ UMP	✗	10	0.8	15.1	2.1	18	2.15	SSBN07: not a centaur; (U:9)	MPC · JPL
2010 JB_{80}	11 May 2010	D. Rabinowitz; S. Tourtellotte	22	✓ CEN	✓ CEN	✓ R	12.9	0.2	17.9	10.3	15.6	3.34	(U:2)	MPC · JPL
2010 JC_{147}	15 May 2010	WISE	6	✓ CEN	✗ DAM	✗	14.6	0.8	41.6	3.5	25.7	1.98	SSBN07: not a centaur albedo: 0.064; (U:1); MPC: Other UMP	MPC · JPL
2010 JE_{215}	10 May 2010	Pan-STARRS	120	✗ TNO	✓ CEN	✓ R	62.7	0.5	11.2	27.2	94	5.98	—	MPC · JPL
2010 JJ_{124}	11 May 2010	A. Udalski; S. S. Sheppard; C. Trujillo	254	✗ TNO	✓ CEN	✓ R	84.7	0.7	37.7	23.6	144	4.62	—	MPC · JPL
2010 KG_{12}	19 May 2010	WISE	5.3	✓ CEN	✗	✗	5.6	0.2	23.6	4.5	6.6	2.79	SSBN07: not a centaur; (U:8)	MPC · JPL
2010 KG_{43}	20 May 2010	WISE	4	✓ CEN	✗ UMP	✗	5.6	0.5	13.7	2.9	8.3	2.7	SSBN07: not a centaur albedo: 0.230; (U:3)	MPC · JPL
2010 KJ_{148}	25 May 2010	WISE	1	✓ CEN	✗ UMP	✗	9.1	0.7	15.6	2.6	15.5	2.37	SSBN07: not a centaur; (U:9)	MPC · JPL
2010 LG_{61}	2 Jun 2010	WISE	0.9	✓ CEN	✗ DAM	✗	6.3	0.8	123.8	1.4	11.2	0.07	SSBN07: not a centaur albedo: 0.089; (U:6)	MPC · JPL
2010 LN_{68}	13 Jun 2010	La Silla Obs.	80	✓ CEN	✓ CEN	✗	12.6	0	15.1	12.3	12.9	3.42	(U:E)	MPC · JPL
2010 MW_{136}	26 Jun 2010	WISE	1	✓ CEN	✗ UMP	✗	8.8	0.7	29.8	2.4	15.1	2.15	SSBN07: not a centaur; (U:9)	MPC · JPL
2010 NM_{1}	5 Jul 2010	WISE	1	✓ CEN	✗ UMP	✗	8.4	0.7	33.5	2.2	14.6	2.04	SSBN07: not a centaur; (U:9)	MPC · JPL
2010 OM_{101}	28 Jul 2010	WISE	3	✓ CEN	✗ DAM	✗	26.1	0.9	118.8	2.1	50.1	-0.66	SSBN07: not a centaur albedo: 0.036; BR-mag: 1.34; (U:1); MPC: Other UMP	MPC · JPL
2010 OR_{1}	25 Jan 2010	WISE	2	✓ CEN	✗ DAM	✗	27	0.9	143.9	2.1	52	-1.22	SSBN07: not a centaur albedo: 0.110; BR-mag: 1.32; (U:1); MPC: Other UMP	MPC · JPL
2010 PK_{16}	3 Aug 2010	WISE	1	✓ CEN	✗ DAM	✗	18.8	0.9	27.7	1.8	35.9	1.71	SSBN07: not a centaur; (U:9)	MPC · JPL
2010 PO_{81}	15 Aug 2010	Pan-STARRS	57	✗ TNO	✓ CEN	✓ R	31.8	0.6	38.8	12.1	50.8	3.24	—	MPC · JPL
2010 RG_{43}	6 Sep 2010	La Silla Obs.	64	✓ CEN	✓ CEN	✗	14.5	0.1	36.6	13.4	15.7	3.03	(U:E)	MPC · JPL
2010 TH	2 Oct 2010	D. Rabinowitz; M. Schwamb; S. Tourtellotte	70	✓ CEN	✓ CEN	✓ R	18.6	0.3	26.7	12.5	24.6	3.47	Grey centaur albedo: 0.078; BR-mag: 1.18; (U:0)	MPC · JPL
2010 TS_{191}	7 Oct 2010	Pan-STARRS	106	✓ CEN	✗	✗ 1:1	30.1	0	6.6	28.6	31.5	4.94	(U:0)	MPC · JPL
2010 TV_{191}	9 Oct 2010	Pan-STARRS	123	✓ CEN	✓ CEN	✓ R	24.8	0.1	11.5	21.5	28	4.45	(U:2)	MPC · JPL
2010 VE_{21}	3 Nov 2010	Pan-STARRS	17	✓ CEN	✓ CEN	✓ R	9.9	0.2	34.4	7.6	12.2	2.74	(U:5)	MPC · JPL
2010 VE_{253}	2 Nov 2010	MLS	56	✗ TNO	✓ CEN	✓ R	31.8	0.4	7.9	16.4	44.6	4.65	—	MPC · JPL
2010 VX_{224}	10 Nov 2010	Pan-STARRS	252	✗ TNO	✗ PLU?	✓ R	39.8	0.2	15.6	31.7	47.7	5.35	—	MPC · JPL
2010 WG9	30 Nov 2010	La Silla Obs.	113	✗ TNO	✓ CEN	✓ R	53.4	0.6	70.3	18.7	85.5	1.82	Grey centaur albedo: 0.074; BR-mag: 1.10; taxonomy: U; suspected binary	MPC · JPL
2011 FS_{53}	31 Mar 2011	Pan-STARRS	11	✓ CEN	✓ CEN	✗	7.6	0.2	6.3	6.2	9.1	3.04	SSBN07: not a centaur; (U:E)	MPC · JPL
2011 GN_{27}	3 Apr 2011	La Silla Obs.	161	✓ CEN	✓ CEN	✗	15.8	0.4	153.9	9.5	22.1	-2.54	(U:)	MPC · JPL
2011 MM4	24 Jun 2011	Pan-STARRS	64	✓ CEN	✓ CEN	✓ R	21.3	0.5	100.5	11.2	31.4	-0.4	albedo: 0.083; (U:0)	MPC · JPL
2011 OF_{45}	26 Jul 2011	Pan-STARRS	15	✓ CEN	✓ CEN	✓ R	9	0.1	19.6	7.7	10.3	3.03	(U:1)	MPC · JPL
2011 RC_{17}	2 Sep 2011	ISON-NM	4	✓ CEN	✗ UMP	✗	6.3	0.5	11.4	2.9	9.6	2.65	SSBN07: not a centaur; (U:1); MPC: Other UMP	MPC · JPL
2011 RS	4 Sep 2011	Pan-STARRS	128	✓ CEN	✓ CEN	✗	20.2	0.2	27.6	15.6	24.8	3.66	(U:E)	MPC · JPL
2011 SP_{25}	20 Sep 2011	Pan-STARRS	2.8	✓ CEN	✗ DAM	✗	19.6	0.9	109.3	2.3	36.9	-0.34	SSBN07: not a centaur; (U:3); MPC: Other UMP	MPC · JPL
2011 SQ_{55}	23 Sep 2011	Pan-STARRS	1.5	✓ CEN	✗ UMP	✗	6.1	0.7	22.4	2.1	10.1	2.37	SSBN07: not a centaur; (U:5)	MPC · JPL
2011 SQ_{249}	21 Oct 1995	Spacewatch	8	✓ CEN	✗ UMP	✗	6.6	0.5	16.7	3.6	9.6	2.71	SSBN07: not a centaur albedo: 0.054; (U:2); MPC: Other UMP	MPC · JPL
2011 SR_{250}	20 Sep 2011	Pan-STARRS	16	✓ CEN	✓ CEN	✓ R	11.1	0.4	8.9	6.8	15.4	3.13	(U:0)	MPC · JPL
2011 SZ_{3}	18 Sep 2011	MLS	0.9	✓ CEN	✗ UMP	✗	6.5	0.8	3.3	1.3	11.6	2.16	SSBN07: not a centaur; (U:9)	MPC · JPL
2011 UQ_{62}	19 Oct 2011	Pan-STARRS	65	✗ TNO	✓ CEN	✓ R	52.8	0.7	16.1	14.6	89.7	4.47	—	MPC · JPL
2011 UR_{402}	23 Oct 2011	Pan-STARRS	26	✓ CEN	✗ UMP	✗	18.5	0.8	24.6	4.1	33	2.44	SSBN07: not a centaur; (U:0); MPC: Other UMP	MPC · JPL
2011 UT_{368}	22 Oct 2011	MLS	2.4	✓ CEN	✗ UMP	✗	8.9	0.8	23.9	2	15.9	2.08	SSBN07: not a centaur; (U:9)	MPC · JPL
2011 WR_{74}	25 Nov 2011	Pan-STARRS	5	✓ CEN	✓ CEN	✓ R	8.9	0.4	10.9	5.2	12.7	2.92	SSBN07: not a centaur; (U:5)	MPC · JPL
2011 YU_{75}	26 Dec 2011	Spacewatch	2.3	✓ CEN	✗ UMP	✗	7.5	0.8	16.7	1.8	13.3	2.18	SSBN07: not a centaur; (U:2); MPC: Other UMP	MPC · JPL
2012 BU_{37}	19 Jan 2012	MLS	2.6	✓ CEN	✗ UMP	✗	10.2	0.7	2	3.1	17.3	2.53	SSBN07: not a centaur; (U:9)	MPC · JPL
2012 BZ_{130}	30 Jan 2012	MLS	5	✓ CEN	✗ UMP	✗	7.2	0.5	15.3	3.5	11	2.67	SSBN07: not a centaur; (U:3)	MPC · JPL
2012 CM_{36}	13 Feb 2012	Pan-STARRS	6	✓ CEN	✗ UMP	✗	5.7	0.4	11.7	3.4	7.9	2.8	SSBN07: not a centaur; (U:0)	MPC · JPL
2012 CN_{29}	3 Feb 2012	MLS	6	✓ CEN	✗ UMP	✗	6.4	0.3	20.1	4.4	8.4	2.79	SSBN07: not a centaur; (U:4); MPC: Other UMP	MPC · JPL
2012 DD_{61}	22 Feb 2012	CSS	13	✓ CEN	✗ UMP	✗	7.5	0.5	18.5	3.8	11.2	2.67	SSBN07: not a centaur; (U:2); MPC: Other UMP	MPC · JPL
2012 DR30	22 Feb 2012	SSS	188	✗ TNO	✓ CEN	✓ S	1130.1	0.9	78	14.5	2147.2	2.68	Grey centaur albedo: 0.076; BR-mag: 1.21; taxonomy: BR-IR	MPC · JPL
2012 DS_{85}	19 Feb 2012	K. Černis; R. P. Boyle	73	✓ CEN	✓ CEN	✓ R	18.8	0.1	16.8	16.3	21.3	3.89	(U:4)	MPC · JPL
2012 FZ_{78}	29 Mar 2012	MLS	32	✓ CEN	✓ CEN	✓ R	19	0.4	17	10.5	27.5	3.55	(U:0)	MPC · JPL
2012 GM_{12}	13 Apr 2012	Pan-STARRS	73	✓ CEN	✓ CEN	✓ R	20.4	0.2	12.3	17	23.8	4.07	(U:2)	MPC · JPL
2012 GU_{11}	12 Apr 2012	Pan-STARRS	92	✗ TNO	✓ CEN	✓ R	169.3	0.8	10.8	18.2	304.7	6.76	—	MPC · JPL
2012 GV_{1}	12 Apr 2012	Pan-STARRS	23	✓ CEN	✓ CEN	✓ R	18.5	0.6	18.9	8.3	28.8	3.25	(U:1)	MPC · JPL
2012 GX17	14 Apr 2012	Pan-STARRS	168	✗ TNO	✓ CEN	✓ R	37.3	0.5	32.6	16.8	55.9	4.04	—	MPC · JPL
2012 LB_{27}	9 Jun 2012	Pan-STARRS	64	✓ CEN	✓ CEN	✓ R	20.4	0.2	25.8	15.6	25.2	3.72	(U:2)	MPC · JPL
2012 PD_{26}	13 Aug 2012	Pan-STARRS	32	✓ CEN	✓ CEN	✓ R	20.5	0.5	7.7	10.1	31	3.65	(U:2)	MPC · JPL
2012 TF_{72}	9 Oct 2012	MLS	1.4	✓ CEN	✗ DAM	✗	11.1	0.9	5.3	1.5	20.8	1.94	SSBN07: not a centaur; (U:9)	MPC · JPL
2012 TJ_{261}	8 Oct 2012	MLS	4	✓ CEN	✗ UMP	✗	6.3	0.4	6.4	3.5	9.2	2.78	SSBN07: not a centaur; (U:9)	MPC · JPL
2012 TL_{139}	9 Oct 2012	Pan-STARRS	6	✓ CEN	✗ DAM	✗	29.9	0.9	160	3.5	56.3	-1.95	SSBN07: not a centaur; (U:0)	MPC · JPL
2012 TN_{149}	8 Oct 2012	MLS	1.4	✓ CEN	✗ UMP	✗	7.1	0.7	3.2	2	12.2	2.35	SSBN07: not a centaur; (U:9)	MPC · JPL
2012 TO_{46}	8 Oct 2012	MLS	2.0	✓ CEN	✗ UMP	✗	5.6	0.8	16	1.4	9.9	2.23	SSBN07: not a centaur; (U:9)	MPC · JPL
2012 TQ_{111}	10 Oct 2012	MLS	1.2	✓ CEN	✗ DAM	✗	13.5	0.9	8	1.6	25.3	1.88	SSBN07: not a centaur; (U:9)	MPC · JPL
2012 TT_{72}	9 Oct 2012	MLS	0.8	✓ CEN	✗ DAM	✗	9.6	0.9	5.1	1.3	17.8	1.92	SSBN07: not a centaur; (U:9)	MPC · JPL
2012 UN_{138}	19 Oct 2012	Pan-STARRS	5	✓ CEN	✗ UMP	✗	10	0.7	16	3.4	16.6	2.53	SSBN07: not a centaur; (U:4); MPC: Other UMP	MPC · JPL
2012 UW_{177}	20 Oct 2012	M. Alexandersen	31	✓ CEN	✓ CEN	✓ R	30.1	0.3	53.8	22.3	37.9	2.91	(U:4)	MPC · JPL
2012 UY_{174}	23 Oct 2012	Pan-STARRS	12	✓ CEN	✓ CEN	✗	11.9	0.4	9.6	7.4	16.4	3.2	(U:E)	MPC · JPL
2012 VG_{94}	13 Nov 2012	VATT	1.5	✓ CEN	✗ UMP	✗	10.6	0.8	8.5	1.8	19.3	2.07	SSBN07: not a centaur; (U:9)	MPC · JPL
2012 YE_{8}	21 Dec 2012	MLS	6	✓ CEN	✗ DAM	✗	9.3	0.6	136.1	3.8	14.7	-1	SSBN07: not a centaur; (U:4); MPC: Other UMP	MPC · JPL
2012 YO_{6}	22 Dec 2012	Pan-STARRS	7	✓ CEN	✗ DAM	✗	6.3	0.5	106.9	3.3	9.3	0.26	SSBN07: not a centaur BR-mag: 1.32; (U:3); MPC: Other UMP	MPC · JPL
2013 AE_{174}	4 Jan 2013	CTIO-DECam	3	✓ CEN	✗ UMP	✗	5.9	0.5	12.6	3.2	8.6	2.73	SSBN07: not a centaur; (U:)	MPC · JPL
2013 AN_{180}	5 Jan 2013	CTIO-DECam	2.8	✓ CEN	✗ UMP	✗	6.5	0.4	12.1	4	9	2.82	SSBN07: not a centaur; (U:)	MPC · JPL
2013 AO_{160}	4 Jan 2013	CTIO-DECam	2.9	✓ CEN	✗ UMP	✗	6.3	0.3	10.8	4.3	8.4	2.87	SSBN07: not a centaur; (U:)	MPC · JPL
2013 AS_{105}	15 Jan 2013	ESA OGS	21	✓ CEN	✓ CEN	✓ R	15.9	0.6	14.6	5.7	26.1	2.93	SSBN07: not a centaur; (U:0)	MPC · JPL
2013 AX_{158}	4 Jan 2013	CTIO-DECam	8	✓ CEN	✓ CEN	✗	25.7	0.7	12.6	6.9	44.5	3.16	(U:)	MPC · JPL
2013 AZ60	10 Jan 2013	MLS	62	✗ TNO	✓ CEN	✓ S	396.6	0.9	16.6	7.9	753.6	7.31	Grey centaur albedo: 0.029; BR-mag: 1.36	MPC · JPL
2013 BK_{78}	17 Jan 2013	Pan-STARRS	18	✗ TNO	✓ CEN	✓ R	37.8	0.7	2.2	8.2	64.3	3.99	—	MPC · JPL
2013 BL76	20 Jan 2013	MLS	39	✗ TNO	✓ CEN	✓ S	990.6	0.9	98.6	8.3	1882.1	-1.79	Grey centaur BR-mag: 1.37	MPC · JPL
2013 BU_{1}	16 Jan 2013	Pan-STARRS	1.5	✓ CEN	✗ UMP	✗	5.5	0.6	6	2.1	8.9	2.56	SSBN07: not a centaur; (U:4)	MPC · JPL
2013 CA_{134}	15 Feb 2013	Pan-STARRS	31	✗ TNO	✓ CEN	✓ R	30.9	0.6	8.5	10.9	49.5	4.03	—	MPC · JPL
2013 CE_{223}	10 Feb 2013	Pan-STARRS	97	✓ CEN	✓ CEN	✓ R	21.7	0.2	5.2	18.3	25.2	4.26	(U:0)	MPC · JPL
2013 CJ_{118}	9 Feb 2013	Pan-STARRS	6	✓ CEN	✓ CEN	✓ R	10.3	0.5	10.3	5.2	15.4	2.92	SSBN07: not a centaur; (U:3)	MPC · JPL
2013 CM_{77}	7 Feb 2013	CSS	4	✓ CEN	✗ UMP	✗	7.4	0.6	8.9	3	11.7	2.6	SSBN07: not a centaur; (U:2); MPC: Other UMP	MPC · JPL
2013 CY_{133}	14 Feb 2013	Pan-STARRS	9	✓ CEN	✓ CEN	✓ R	7.9	0.3	17.7	5.8	9.9	2.92	SSBN07: not a centaur; (U:0)	MPC · JPL
2013 CY_{167}	14 Feb 2013	Pan-STARRS	0.9	✓ CEN	✗ DAM	✗	10.3	0.8	5.9	1.6	19	1.99	SSBN07: not a centaur; (U:9)	MPC · JPL
2013 CZ_{10}	1 Feb 2013	CASADO	4	✓ CEN	✗ UMP	✗	9.7	0.7	5.8	3	16.5	2.49	SSBN07: not a centaur; (U:9)	MPC · JPL
2013 EZ_{27}	5 Mar 2013	Pan-STARRS	17	✓ CEN	✓ CEN	✓ R	19.5	0.5	14.6	8.9	30.2	3.41	(U:0)	MPC · JPL
2013 FL_{28}	16 Mar 2013	S. S. Sheppard	91	✗ TNO	✗ SDO	✓ S	421.7	0.9	16	31.4	801.2	7.56	—	MPC · JPL
2013 FN_{28}	16 Mar 2013	S. S. Sheppard	122	✗ TNO	✓ CEN	✓ R	35.2	0.4	8.7	20.3	49.3	4.86	—	MPC · JPL
2013 GH_{132}	1 Apr 2013	MLS	6	✓ CEN	✗ DAM	✗	6.4	0.8	65.8	1.4	11.4	1.38	SSBN07: not a centaur; (U:9)	MPC · JPL
2013 GJ_{138}	11 Apr 2013	Pan-STARRS	134	✗ TNO	✓ CEN	✓ R	121.2	0.7	28	26.1	206	6.13	—	MPC · JPL
2013 GW_{141}	6 Apr 2013	Pan-STARRS	128	✗ TNO	✓ CEN	✓ S	565.6	0.9	32.1	23.5	1074.7	7.71	—	MPC · JPL
2013 GY_{54}	4 Apr 2013	Pan-STARRS	8	✓ CEN	✗ UMP	✗	13.6	0.7	8.3	4.6	22.6	2.79	SSBN07: not a centaur; (U:1); MPC: Other UMP	MPC · JPL
2013 HG_{162}	16 Apr 2013	Pan-STARRS	18	✗ TNO	✓ CEN	✓ R	34.2	0.8	68.5	5.5	61.6	1.28	SSBN07: not a centaur	MPC · JPL
2013 JC_{64}	8 May 2013	OSSOS	21	✓ CEN	✓ CEN	✓ R	22.2	0.4	32	13.8	30.7	3.48	(U:3)	MPC · JPL
2013 JD_{4}	3 May 2013	MLS	3	✓ CEN	✗ DAM	✗	12.2	0.9	73	1.6	22.8	0.87	SSBN07: not a centaur; (U:5)	MPC · JPL
2013 JQ_{64}	8 May 2013	OSSOS	320	✗ TNO	✓ CEN	✓ R	48.9	0.5	34.9	22.3	73.4	4.46	—	MPC · JPL
2013 JX_{14}	5 May 2013	Pan-STARRS	23	✓ CEN	✓ CEN	✓ R	11.3	0.4	10.4	7.3	15.3	3.17	(U:0)	MPC · JPL
2013 LA_{2}	1 Jun 2013	Pan-STARRS	2.5	✓ CEN	✗ DAM	✗	5.7	0.5	175.1	3	8.3	-0.92	SSBN07: not a centaur; (U:7)	MPC · JPL
2013 LG_{29}	12 Jun 2013	Pan-STARRS	6	✓ CEN	✗ UMP	✗	17.1	0.8	15.4	3.6	30.5	2.44	SSBN07: not a centaur; (U:1); MPC: Other UMP	MPC · JPL
2013 LU_{35}	5 Jun 2013	New Horizons KBO Search (Magellan/Clay)	58	✗ TNO	✓ CEN	✗	58.3	0.5	3.1	27	87.4	5.88	—	MPC · JPL
2013 MB_{12}	20 Jun 2013	Pan-STARRS	51	✓ CEN	✓ CEN	✓ R	22.8	0.3	14	15.2	30.4	4.06	(U:1)	MPC · JPL
2013 NS_{11}	5 Jul 2013	Pan-STARRS	15	✓ CEN	✗ DAM	✗	12.6	0.8	130.4	2.7	22.5	-0.83	SSBN07: not a centaur albedo: 0.030; BR-mag: 1.30; (U:0); MPC: Other UMP	MPC · JPL
2013 OL_{15}	20 Jul 2013	Pan-STARRS	6	✓ CEN	✗ UMP	✗	5.6	0.4	16.8	3.2	7.9	2.73	SSBN07: not a centaur; (U:4)	MPC · JPL
2013 PJ_{44}	12 Aug 2013	Pan-STARRS	7	✓ CEN	✗ UMP	✗	12.2	0.7	21.5	3.9	20.4	2.52	SSBN07: not a centaur; (U:4); MPC: Other UMP	MPC · JPL
2013 PQ_{37}	12 Aug 2013	ZTF	4	✓ CEN	✗ UMP	✗	6	0.6	30	2.7	9.3	2.42	SSBN07: not a centaur; (U:3)	MPC · JPL
2013 PS_{21}	7 Aug 2013	ARO	1.3	✓ CEN	✗ UMP	✗	11	0.8	11.2	1.8	20.2	2.04	SSBN07: not a centaur; (U:9)	MPC · JPL
2013 PU_{74}	4 Aug 2013	Pan-STARRS	48	✗ TNO	✓ CEN	✓ R	34.3	0.5	12.7	15.8	51.5	4.49	—	MPC · JPL
2013 RA_{96}	10 Sep 2013	CASADO	0.8	✓ CEN	✗ DAM	✗	19.9	0.9	5.2	1.6	38.2	1.78	SSBN07: not a centaur; (U:9)	MPC · JPL
2013 RA_{156}	2 Sep 2013	CTIO-DECam	142	✗ TNO	✓ CEN	✓ R	31.1	0	13.1	28.6	31.1	4.93	—	MPC · JPL
2013 RA_{157}	10 Sep 2013	CTIO-DECam	76	✗ TNO	✗ SDO	✓ S	55.1	0.3	37.6	33.1	71.6	5.02	—	MPC · JPL
2013 RD_{109}	2 Sep 2013	CTIO-DECam	124	✗ TNO	✓ CEN	✓ R	32.6	0	11.1	29.7	32.6	5.07	—	MPC · JPL
2013 RE_{158}	13 Sep 2013	CTIO-DECam	107	✗ TNO	✗ TNO	✓ R	48.5	0.4	28.2	29.1	67.9	5.04	—	MPC · JPL
2013 RG_{98}	3 Sep 2013	CTIO-DES	84	✓ CEN	✓ CEN	✓ R	23.2	0.2	46	19.3	27.1	3.11	(U:3)	MPC · JPL
2013 RL_{109}	10 Sep 2013	CTIO-DECam	117	✗ TNO	✗ TNO	✓ R	40.5	0.2	14.2	32.2	48.6	5.43	—	MPC · JPL
2013 RN_{30}	3 Sep 2013	Pan-STARRS	15	✓ CEN	✓ CEN	✓ R	14.1	0.4	16.6	8.1	20.1	3.23	(U:2)	MPC · JPL
2013 RN_{158}	8 Sep 2013	CTIO-DECam	85	✗ TNO	✗ SDO	✓ R	46.9	0.3	14.4	30.4	61	5.66	—	MPC · JPL
2013 RY_{108}	10 Sep 2013	CTIO-DECam	137	✗ TNO	✓ CEN	✓ R	45.9	0.4	10.8	24.6	64.2	5.46	—	MPC · JPL
2013 SO_{107}	16 Sep 2013	MLS	8	✓ CEN	✓ CEN	✓ R	6.8	0.2	25	5.3	8.3	2.78	SSBN07: not a centaur; (U:2)	MPC · JPL
2013 SV_{99}	28 Sep 2013	CTIO-DECam	2.8	✓ CEN	✓ CEN	✓ R	6.9	0.3	17.1	5.1	8.7	2.88	SSBN07: not a centaur; (U:); MPC: Other UMP	MPC · JPL
2013 SY_{112}	30 Sep 2013	CTIO-DECam	140	✗ TNO	✓ CEN	✓ R	38.4	0.3	13.4	26.4	49.9	5.18	—	MPC · JPL
2013 TB_{187}	12 Oct 2013	CTIO-DECam	158	✗ TNO	✓ CEN	✓ R	77.9	0.7	50.8	16.4	132.3	3.56	—	MPC · JPL
2013 TM_{56}	4 Oct 2013	MLS	2.0	✓ CEN	✗ UMP	✗	6.1	0.7	17.9	2	10.1	2.39	SSBN07: not a centaur; (U:9)	MPC · JPL
2013 TP_{145}	8 Oct 2013	La Silla Obs.	77	✓ CEN	✓ CEN	✓ R	23	0.4	29.3	13.4	32.5	3.56	(U:1)	MPC · JPL
2013 TS_{227}	3 Oct 2013	CTIO-DECam	142	✗ TNO	✓ CEN	✓ R	33.7	0.3	24.3	22.8	43.8	4.58	—	MPC · JPL
2013 TY_{227}	4 Oct 2013	CTIO-DECam	137	✗ TNO	✓ CEN	✓ R	36.3	0.2	36.5	27.3	43.5	4.31	—	MPC · JPL
2013 UC_{17}	31 Oct 2013	OSSOS	28	✓ CEN	✓ CEN	✓ R	19.4	0.1	32.4	16.9	21.9	3.5	(U:3)	MPC · JPL
2013 UE_{15}	30 Oct 2013	Pan-STARRS	111	✗ TNO	✓ CEN	✓ R	60.2	0.6	6.7	20.8	96.3	5.49	—	MPC · JPL
2013 UR_{15}	31 Oct 2013	OSSOS	34	✗ TNO	✓ CEN	✓ R	56.6	0.7	22.2	15.6	96.2	4.45	—	MPC · JPL
2013 UU_{17}	31 Oct 2013	OSSOS	51	✓ CEN	✓ CEN	✓ R	26	0.2	8.5	19.5	32.5	4.48	(U:3)	MPC · JPL
2013 VK_{46}	8 Nov 2013	CTIO-DECam	108	✗ TNO	✓ CEN	✓ R	42	0.3	13.6	28.9	54.6	5.39	—	MPC · JPL
2013 VZ70	1 Nov 2013	Mauna Kea Obs.	10	✓ CEN	✓ CEN	✓ R	9.1	0.1	12.1	8.3	10	3.15	(U:3)	MPC · JPL
2013 WK_{64}	28 Nov 2013	Pan-STARRS	5	✓ CEN	✗ DAM	✗	7.9	0.6	62.5	2.9	12.9	1.54	SSBN07: not a centaur; (U:2); MPC: Other UMP	MPC · JPL
2013 YF_{48}	28 Dec 2013	MLS	10	✓ CEN	✗ DAM	✗	9.2	0.5	77.7	4.4	14.1	1.05	SSBN07: not a centaur; (U:3); MPC: Other UMP	MPC · JPL
2013 YG_{48}	28 Dec 2013	CSS	2.2	✓ CEN	✗ DAM	✗	8.2	0.8	61.3	2	14.3	1.43	SSBN07: not a centaur BR-mag: 1.32; (U:2); MPC: Other UMP	MPC · JPL
2013 YK_{122}	30 Dec 2013	Pan-STARRS	1.5	✓ CEN	✗ UMP	✗	7.3	0.8	1.7	1.7	13	2.23	SSBN07: not a centaur; (U:9)	MPC · JPL
2014 DT_{112}	26 Feb 2014	Pan-STARRS	46	✗ TNO	✓ CEN	✓ R	47.4	0.7	40.5	13.2	80.6	3.39	—	MPC · JPL
2014 DW_{9}	20 Feb 2014	Pan-STARRS	7	✓ CEN	✗ UMP	✗	7.4	0.5	16.1	3.7	11.2	2.69	SSBN07: not a centaur; (U:2)	MPC · JPL
2014 EY_{247}	5 Mar 2014	CTIO-DECam	6	✓ CEN	✗ UMP	✗	6.1	0.3	6.1	4.4	7.8	2.92	SSBN07: not a centaur; (U:5); MPC: Other UMP	MPC · JPL
2014 FE_{72}	26 Mar 2014	Cerro Tololo Obs.	227	✗ TNO	✗ ESDO	✓ S	1293.9	0.9	20.7	36	2458.4	12.86	—	MPC · JPL
2014 FP_{59}	30 Mar 2014	CTIO-DECam	3	✓ CEN	✗ UMP	✗	6	0.4	4.6	3.8	8.1	2.86	SSBN07: not a centaur; (U:9)	MPC · JPL
2014 FU_{61}	28 Mar 2014	MLS	9	✓ CEN	✓ CEN	✓ R	9.2	0.4	19.5	5.4	13	2.84	SSBN07: not a centaur; (U:4)	MPC · JPL
2014 GK_{65}	9 Apr 2014	Pan-STARRS	232	✗ TNO	✓ CEN	✓ S	43.5	0.3	19.5	29.8	56.6	5.32	—	MPC · JPL
2014 GR_{53}	4 Apr 2014	Pan-STARRS	134	✗ TNO	✓ CEN	✓ S	210.5	0.8	42.1	22.6	378.9	5.69	—	MPC · JPL
2014 GZ_{44}	5 Apr 2014	Pan-STARRS	2.4	✓ CEN	✗ UMP	✗	5.8	0.6	21.5	2.4	9.2	2.49	SSBN07: not a centaur; (U:5)	MPC · JPL
2014 HC_{114}	23 Apr 2014	CTIO-DECam	0.8	✓ CEN	✗ DAM	✗	13.2	0.9	9.8	1.5	24.9	1.83	SSBN07: not a centaur; (U:9)	MPC · JPL
2014 HG_{60}	23 Apr 2014	CTIO-DECam	0.7	✓ CEN	✗ UMP	✗	6.2	0.7	3.8	1.5	10.8	2.28	SSBN07: not a centaur; (U:9)	MPC · JPL
2014 HJ_{104}	23 Apr 2014	CTIO-DECam	0.6	✓ CEN	✗ DAM	✗	9.2	0.8	9.5	1.4	17	1.97	SSBN07: not a centaur; (U:9)	MPC · JPL
2014 HM_{59}	23 Apr 2014	CTIO-DECam	1.3	✓ CEN	✗ DAM	✗	12.7	0.9	9.6	1.5	24	1.84	SSBN07: not a centaur; (U:9)	MPC · JPL
2014 HR_{54}	23 Apr 2014	CTIO-DECam	1.3	✓ CEN	✗ UMP	✗	5.6	0.7	12.2	1.7	9.6	2.39	SSBN07: not a centaur; (U:9)	MPC · JPL
2014 HS_{67}	23 Apr 2014	CTIO-DECam	0.9	✓ CEN	✗ DAM	✗	9	0.9	6.5	1.3	16.7	1.94	SSBN07: not a centaur; (U:9)	MPC · JPL
2014 HS_{95}	23 Apr 2014	CTIO-DECam	0.5	✓ CEN	✗ UMP	✗	7.9	0.8	12.7	1.6	14.2	2.11	SSBN07: not a centaur; (U:9)	MPC · JPL
2014 HT_{94}	23 Apr 2014	CTIO-DECam	0.8	✓ CEN	✗ DAM	✗	13.2	0.9	5.6	1.4	25.1	1.81	SSBN07: not a centaur; (U:9)	MPC · JPL
2014 HU_{108}	23 Apr 2014	CTIO-DECam	0.3	✓ CEN	✗ UMP	✗	5.7	0.8	4.8	1.3	10	2.25	SSBN07: not a centaur; (U:9)	MPC · JPL
2014 HU_{110}	23 Apr 2014	CTIO-DECam	1.1	✓ CEN	✗ UMP	✗	10.4	0.8	6.8	1.6	19.1	2.01	SSBN07: not a centaur; (U:9)	MPC · JPL
2014 HV_{176}	29 Apr 2014	MLS	11	✓ CEN	✗ UMP	✗	7.3	0.3	31.3	5	9.7	2.63	SSBN07: not a centaur; (U:0)	MPC · JPL
2014 HW_{113}	23 Apr 2014	CTIO-DECam	0.8	✓ CEN	✗ DAM	✗	20	0.9	8.8	1.4	38.5	1.71	SSBN07: not a centaur; (U:9)	MPC · JPL
2014 HX_{63}	23 Apr 2014	CTIO-DECam	1.6	✓ CEN	✗ UMP	✗	6.3	0.7	7.2	1.6	10.9	2.3	SSBN07: not a centaur; (U:9)	MPC · JPL
2014 HX_{64}	23 Apr 2014	CTIO-DECam	1.0	✓ CEN	✗ DAM	✗	13.5	0.9	4.4	1.4	25.5	1.83	SSBN07: not a centaur; (U:9)	MPC · JPL
2014 HY_{31}	23 Apr 2014	CTIO-DECam	1.2	✓ CEN	✗ UMP	✗	6.2	0.7	22.2	2	10.5	2.33	SSBN07: not a centaur; (U:9)	MPC · JPL
2014 HY_{195}	29 Apr 2014	CTIO-DECam	10	✓ CEN	✓ CEN	✓ R	7.2	0.1	22.9	6.4	7.9	2.88	SSBN07: not a centaur; (U:1)	MPC · JPL
2014 JE_{80}	4 May 2014	Pan-STARRS	64	✗ TNO	✓ CEN	✓ R	92.1	0.8	28.1	17.9	165.8	4.51	—	MPC · JPL
2014 JJ_{57}	9 May 2014	Pan-STARRS	17	✓ CEN	✗ DAM	✗	7	0.3	95.9	5	9	0.51	SSBN07: not a centaur; (U:0); MPC: Other UMP	MPC · JPL
2014 JV_{80}	7 May 2014	Pan-STARRS	168	✗ TNO	✓ CEN	✓ R	48.7	0.4	8.2	28.8	68.1	5.65	—	MPC · JPL
2014 KG_{2}	18 May 2014	WISE	1.5	✓ CEN	✗ UMP	✗	6.6	0.8	24.1	1.4	11.8	2.06	SSBN07: not a centaur albedo: 0.070; (U:1)	MPC · JPL
2014 KL_{84}	20 May 2014	Pan-STARRS	9	✓ CEN	✓ CEN	✓ R	16.2	0.6	12.2	5.8	26.6	2.96	SSBN07: not a centaur; (U:1)	MPC · JPL
2014 KM_{122}	23 May 2014	Pan-STARRS	9	✓ CEN	✗ UMP	✗	6.3	0.4	27.6	3.6	8.9	2.59	SSBN07: not a centaur; (U:1); MPC: Other UMP	MPC · JPL
2014 KV_{3}	21 May 2014	Spacewatch	7	✓ CEN	✗ UMP	✗	5.9	0.4	32.2	3.6	8.2	2.54	SSBN07: not a centaur; (U:3)	MPC · JPL
2014 LR_{14}	2 Jun 2014	MLS	23	✓ CEN	✓ CEN	✓ R	18.9	0.5	6.3	8.9	28.9	3.49	(U:0)	MPC · JPL
2014 MA_{71}	27 Jun 2014	Pan-STARRS	2.2	✓ CEN	✗ UMP	✗	5.6	0.6	33.9	2.3	9	2.32	SSBN07: not a centaur; (U:3)	MPC · JPL
2014 MX_{69}	24 Jun 2014	Pan-STARRS	176	✗ TNO	✓ CEN	✓ R	32.4	0.2	10.9	23.5	38.9	4.96	—	MPC · JPL
2014 NV_{65}	8 Jul 2014	Pan-STARRS	84	✗ TNO	✓ CEN	✓ R	118	0.8	12.3	22.2	212.3	5.63	—	MPC · JPL
2014 NX_{65}	8 Jul 2014	Pan-STARRS	67	✓ CEN	✓ CEN	✓ R	23.1	0.2	11.4	18.4	27.8	4.27	(U:0)	MPC · JPL
2014 OF_{331}	29 Jul 2014	Pan-STARRS	0.6	✓ CEN	✗ UMP	✗	5.6	0.8	5.9	1.4	9.8	2.29	SSBN07: not a centaur; (U:9)	MPC · JPL
2014 ON_{57}	25 Jul 2014	Pan-STARRS	12	✓ CEN	✗ UMP	✗	15.3	0.7	9.7	4.8	25.9	2.79	SSBN07: not a centaur; (U:0); MPC: Other UMP	MPC · JPL
2014 OW_{393}	25 Jul 2014	Pan-STARRS	64	✗ TNO	✓ CEN	✓ R	42.9	0.6	22.2	14.4	68.6	4.38	—	MPC · JPL
2014 OY_{393}	25 Jul 2014	Pan-STARRS	73	✗ TNO	✓ CEN	✓ R	83.1	0.7	9	18.7	141.3	5.7	—	MPC · JPL
2014 PA_{7}	3 Aug 2014	Pan-STARRS	4	✓ CEN	✗ UMP	✗	5.6	0.4	32.7	3.3	8	2.52	SSBN07: not a centaur; (U:2)	MPC · JPL
2014 PQ_{70}	3 Aug 2014	Pan-STARRS	8	✓ CEN	✓ CEN	✓ R	16.1	0.6	15	6.2	26	3.01	SSBN07: not a centaur; (U:0)	MPC · JPL
2014 QH_{563}	18 Aug 2014	CTIO-DECam	89	✗ TNO	✗ TNO	✓ R	37.2	0.1	13.2	31.9	40.9	5.32	—	MPC · JPL
2014 QM_{288}	25 Aug 2014	Pan-STARRS	1.7	✓ CEN	✗ UMP	✗	7.9	0.8	28.7	1.9	13.9	2.06	SSBN07: not a centaur; (U:9)	MPC · JPL
2014 QT_{495}	22 Aug 2014	CTIO-DECam	72	✗ TNO	✗ SDO	✓ S	58	0.4	44.7	30	81.2	4.44	—	MPC · JPL
2014 QU_{250}	22 Aug 2014	Pan-STARRS	0.8	✓ CEN	✗ DAM	✗	12.3	0.9	9.1	1.6	23	1.94	SSBN07: not a centaur; (U:9)	MPC · JPL
2014 QW_{243}	22 Aug 2014	Pan-STARRS	1.0	✓ CEN	✗ UMP	✗	8.3	0.8	18.1	2	14.5	2.19	SSBN07: not a centaur; (U:9)	MPC · JPL
2014 QW_{510}	19 Aug 2014	CTIO-DECam	173	✗ TNO	✓ CEN	✓ R	210.6	0.8	26.1	26	379.1	6.88	—	MPC · JPL
2014 QZ_{111}	20 Aug 2014	Pan-STARRS	4	✓ CEN	✗ DAM	✗	12.2	0.9	15.8	1.6	22.7	1.9	SSBN07: not a centaur; (U:9)	MPC · JPL
2014 RE_{12}	2 Sep 2014	Pan-STARRS	18	✓ CEN	✓ CEN	✓ R	14.3	0.6	31.6	5.1	23.4	2.52	SSBN07: not a centaur; (U:0); MPC: Other UMP	MPC · JPL
2014 RK_{86}	11 Sep 2014	CTIO-DECam	126	✗ TNO	✓ CEN	✓ R	417	0.9	26.3	22.1	792.4	7.01	—	MPC · JPL
2014 SB_{349}	24 Sep 2014	CTIO-DES	77	✓ CEN	✓ CEN	✓ R	25.9	0.2	15.5	21.3	30.6	4.43	(U:2)	MPC · JPL
2014 SG_{304}	30 Sep 2014	CSS	3	✓ CEN	✗ UMP	✗	6.6	0.7	9.5	2.3	11	2.46	SSBN07: not a centaur; (U:2)	MPC · JPL
2014 SJ_{378}	21 Sep 2014	CTIO-DECam	140	✗ TNO	✓ CEN	✓ R	82.9	0.7	37.1	23.6	140.9	4.61	—	MPC · JPL
2014 SJ_{404}	30 Sep 2014	CTIO-DECam	105	✗ TNO	✓ CEN	✓ S	39.4	0.2	23.6	30	47.3	5.07	—	MPC · JPL
2014 SQ_{339}	29 Sep 2014	Pan-STARRS	2.1	✓ CEN	✗ DAM	✗	27.9	0.9	128.5	2.8	53	-1.07	SSBN07: not a centaur; (U:4); MPC: Other UMP	MPC · JPL
2014 SQ_{369}	20 Sep 2014	Pan-STARRS	2.0	✓ CEN	✗ UMP	✗	6	0.7	11.6	2	10.1	2.43	SSBN07: not a centaur; (U:2); MPC: Other UMP	MPC · JPL
2014 SS_{303}	20 Sep 2014	Pan-STARRS	9	✓ CEN	✓ CEN	✓ R	13.2	0.5	3.8	6.8	19.7	3.17	(U:0)	MPC · JPL
2014 SU_{349}	18 Sep 2014	Cerro Tololo Obs.	202	✗ TNO	✓ CEN	✗	94.8	0.6	23.7	28.8	151.7	6.31	—	MPC · JPL
2014 TK_{34}	1 Oct 2014	Pan-STARRS	8	✓ CEN	✗ UMP	✗	13.8	0.7	13.1	4.1	23.5	2.64	SSBN07: not a centaur; (U:1); MPC: Other UMP	MPC · JPL
2014 TZ_{115}	3 Oct 2014	CTIO-DECam	150	✗ TNO	✗ TNO	✓ S	41.8	0.2	25.5	31.5	50.1	5.13	—	MPC · JPL
2014 UA_{229}	22 Oct 2014	OSSOS	29	✗ TNO	✓ CEN	✓ R	35.2	0.3	31.2	21.8	45.7	4.39	—	MPC · JPL
2014 UC_{241}	24 Oct 2014	CTIO-DECam	1.1	✓ CEN	✗ UMP	✗	9.6	0.8	7.4	2.3	16.8	2.3	SSBN07: not a centaur; (U:9)	MPC · JPL
2014 UF_{77}	21 Oct 2014	MLS	1.4	✓ CEN	✗ UMP	✗	5.6	0.7	11.6	1.4	9.8	2.29	SSBN07: not a centaur; (U:9)	MPC · JPL
2014 UG_{6}	18 Oct 2014	MLS	0.9	✓ CEN	✗ DAM	✗	12.4	0.9	7.1	1.4	23.4	1.82	SSBN07: not a centaur; (U:9)	MPC · JPL
2014 UG_{229}	22 Oct 2014	OSSOS	25	✓ CEN	✓ CEN	✓ R	28.1	0.4	12.2	15.6	40.6	4.26	(U:2)	MPC · JPL
2014 UJ_{225}	22 Oct 2014	OSSOS	42	✓ CEN	✓ CEN	✓ R	23.2	0.4	21.3	14.4	32	3.87	(U:1)	MPC · JPL
2014 UK_{70}	21 Oct 2014	MLS	22	✓ CEN	✓ CEN	✗	22.5	0.7	169.3	6.3	38.7	-2.6	SSBN07: not a centaur; (U:9)	MPC · JPL
2014 UQ_{229}	22 Oct 2014	OSSOS	67	✗ TNO	✓ CEN	✓ R	50.6	0.7	5.7	11	86	4.53	—	MPC · JPL
2014 UU_{26}	20 Oct 2014	MLS	2.4	✓ CEN	✗ DAM	✗	11.6	0.9	1.5	1.5	21.7	1.9	SSBN07: not a centaur; (U:9)	MPC · JPL
2014 UV_{114}	26 Oct 2014	MLS	4	✓ CEN	✗ DAM	✗	13	0.7	170.9	4	22	-1.86	SSBN07: not a centaur; (U:5); MPC: Other UMP	MPC · JPL
2014 UW_{277}	29 Oct 2014	CTIO-DECam	93	✓ CEN	✓ CEN	✓ R	26.5	0.4	35.7	15.2	37.9	3.51	(U:6)	MPC · JPL
2014 UY_{224}	21 Oct 2014	CTIO-DECam	84	✗ TNO	✓ CEN	✓ R	128.3	0.8	26.5	20.3	230.9	5.37	—	MPC · JPL
2014 VC_{41}	4 Nov 2014	CTIO-DECam	128	✗ TNO	✓ CEN	✓ R	37.9	0.2	46.6	28.8	45.5	3.78	—	MPC · JPL
2014 VR_{39}	12 Nov 2014	CTIO-DECam	44	✓ CEN	✓ CEN	✓ R	27.4	0.3	32.7	20.3	34.5	3.92	(U:4)	MPC · JPL
2014 VT_{37}	12 Nov 2014	CTIO-DECam	66	✗ TNO	✗ TNO	✓ R	40	0.2	33.5	29.4	47.9	4.66	—	MPC · JPL
2014 WB_{536}	26 Nov 2014	Pan-STARRS	116	✗ TNO	✓ CEN	✓ R	60.1	0.5	6.9	26.5	90.1	5.93	—	MPC · JPL
2014 WK_{346}	22 Nov 2014	Pan-STARRS	2.4	✓ CEN	✗ DAM	✗	8.4	0.8	9.2	1.3	15.4	1.98	SSBN07: not a centaur; (U:9)	MPC · JPL
2014 WQ_{365}	24 Nov 2014	MLS	6	✓ CEN	✗ UMP	✗	9.3	0.6	22.6	3.7	14.8	2.54	SSBN07: not a centaur; (U:0)	MPC · JPL
2014 WW_{508}	26 Nov 2014	Pan-STARRS	42	✓ CEN	✓ CEN	✓ R	28.1	0.5	9.5	13.2	43	4.07	(U:0)	MPC · JPL
2014 WX_{574}	29 Nov 2014	Pan-STARRS	4	✓ CEN	✗ UMP	✗	8.6	0.6	4.1	3.5	13.6	2.68	SSBN07: not a centaur; (U:1)	MPC · JPL
2014 YC_{92}	16 Dec 2014	CTIO-DECam	364	✗ TNO	✗ SDO	✓ S	64.8	0.5	32	32.2	97.2	5.27	—	MPC · JPL
2014 YO_{46}	27 Dec 2014	SST	1.0	✓ CEN	✗ UMP	✗	7	0.8	9.4	1.5	12.4	2.17	SSBN07: not a centaur; (U:9)	MPC · JPL
2014 YY_{49}	16 Dec 2014	Pan-STARRS	32	✗ TNO	✓ CEN	✓ R	31.2	0.6	20.4	12.2	49.9	3.84	albedo: 0.260	MPC · JPL
2015 AD_{25}	12 Jan 2015	Pan-STARRS	0.9	✓ CEN	✗ UMP	✗	5.7	0.7	13.2	2	9.5	2.45	SSBN07: not a centaur; (U:9)	MPC · JPL
2015 AD_{298}	7 Jan 2015	CTIO-DECam	122	✗ TNO	✓ CEN	✓ S	398.4	0.9	47.2	18.7	756.9	5.2	—	MPC · JPL
2015 AH_{161}	14 Jan 2015	Pan-STARRS	1.2	✓ CEN	✗ UMP	✗	7	0.8	0.5	1.4	12.6	2.15	SSBN07: not a centaur; (U:9)	MPC · JPL
2015 AH_{281}	13 Jan 2015	Pan-STARRS	334	✗ TNO	✗ TNO	✓ R	37.6	0.4	9.6	22.1	52.6	5	—	MPC · JPL
2015 AM_{107}	14 Jan 2015	Pan-STARRS	2.0	✓ CEN	✗ DAM	✗	12.8	0.9	7.1	1.6	24	1.92	SSBN07: not a centaur; (U:9)	MPC · JPL
2015 AO_{44}	27 Nov 2014	Pan-STARRS	12	✓ CEN	✗ DAM	✗	21.9	0.8	139.9	3.6	40.2	-1.49	SSBN07: not a centaur; (U:0); MPC: Other UMP	MPC · JPL
2015 AR_{284}	15 Jan 2015	CSS	4	✓ CEN	✗ UMP	✗	6	0.6	10.7	2.4	9.6	2.55	SSBN07: not a centaur; (U:2)	MPC · JPL
2015 BB_{480}	20 Jan 2015	Pan-STARRS	1.5	✓ CEN	✗ UMP	✗	7.7	0.7	18.1	1.9	13.4	2.21	SSBN07: not a centaur; (U:9)	MPC · JPL
2015 BE_{384}	20 Jan 2015	Pan-STARRS	1.0	✓ CEN	✗ UMP	✗	9.4	0.8	0.3	1.8	16.9	2.13	SSBN07: not a centaur; (U:9)	MPC · JPL
2015 BE_{568}	18 Jan 2015	Pan-STARRS	80	✗ TNO	✓ CEN	✓ R	74.1	0.7	23.8	19.5	126	5	—	MPC · JPL
2015 BH_{311}	20 Jan 2015	MLS	5	✓ CEN	✗ DAM	✗	7.7	0.7	94.5	2.6	12.8	0.54	SSBN07: not a centaur; (U:9); MPC: Other UMP	MPC · JPL
2015 BH_{518}	24 Jan 2015	Pan-STARRS	134	✓ CEN	✓ CEN	✓ R	27.7	0.1	10.9	25.3	30	4.7	(U:0)	MPC · JPL
2015 BH_{526}	20 Jan 2015	Mauna Kea Obs.	0.6	✓ CEN	✗ UMP	✗	16.7	0.9	8.4	2	31.4	2.01	SSBN07: not a centaur; (U:9)	MPC · JPL
2015 BK_{518}	21 Jan 2015	Pan-STARRS	8	✓ CEN	✓ CEN	✓ R	14.1	0.5	7	6.4	21.9	3.1	(U:0)	MPC · JPL
2015 BW_{524}	16 Jan 2015	Mauna Kea Obs.	8	✓ CEN	✗ UMP	✗	6.9	0.3	9.2	4.8	9	2.92	SSBN07: not a centaur; (U:4); MPC: Other UMP	MPC · JPL
2015 BX_{306}	20 Jan 2015	MLS	2.3	✓ CEN	✗ UMP	✗	5.5	0.5	11.3	2.7	8.3	2.68	SSBN07: not a centaur; (U:2)	MPC · JPL
2015 BX_{514}	20 Jan 2015	Pan-STARRS	7	✓ CEN	✗ UMP	✗	12.1	0.6	4.7	4.6	19.7	2.81	SSBN07: not a centaur; (U:1); MPC: Other UMP	MPC · JPL
2015 BX_{603}	25 Jan 2015	Pan-STARRS	91	✓ CEN	✓ CEN	✓ R	23.5	0.2	5.6	19.5	27.5	4.39	(U:3)	MPC · JPL
2015 DB_{198}	20 Feb 2015	Pan-STARRS	13	✓ CEN	✗ UMP	✗	8.2	0.4	21.7	4.7	11.7	2.75	SSBN07: not a centaur; (U:0); MPC: Other UMP	MPC · JPL
2015 DK_{249}	17 Feb 2015	CTIO-DECam	178	✗ TNO	✓ CEN	✗	392.3	0.9	6.9	27.9	745.4	7.53	—	MPC · JPL
2015 DQ_{249}	17 Feb 2015	CTIO-DECam	35	✓ CEN	✓ CEN	✗	25	0.3	42	18.2	31.7	3.34	(U:)	MPC · JPL
2015 DS_{249}	17 Feb 2015	CTIO-DECam	88	✗ TNO	✓ CEN	✓ R	54.6	0.6	11.4	18.1	87.4	5.18	—	MPC · JPL
2015 DT_{248}	17 Feb 2015	CTIO-DECam	24	✓ CEN	✓ CEN	✗	21.2	0.4	22.2	13.7	28.7	3.74	(U:9)	MPC · JPL
2015 DU_{249}	17 Feb 2015	CTIO-DECam	508	✗ TNO	✓ CEN	✗ ScNr	47.1	0.5	18.9	19.9	70.7	5.04	—	MPC · JPL
2015 EV_{45}	14 Mar 2015	Pan-STARRS	2.0	✓ CEN	✗ DAM	✗	24	0.9	7.2	1.7	46.2	1.8	SSBN07: not a centaur; (U:9)	MPC · JPL
2015 FK_{345}	18 Mar 2015	Pan-STARRS	9	✓ CEN	✓ CEN	✓ R	9.4	0.3	5.2	6.5	12.4	3.1	(U:0)	MPC · JPL
2015 GA_{54}	13 Apr 2015	OSSOS	42	✓ CEN	✓ CEN	✓ R	22.2	0.3	11.4	16.5	27.9	4.15	(U:4)	MPC · JPL
2015 GB_{46}	12 Apr 2015	Wildberg Obs.	0.8	✓ CEN	✗ UMP	✗	6.8	0.8	5.3	1.5	12.1	2.2	SSBN07: not a centaur; (U:9)	MPC · JPL
2015 GB_{54}	13 Apr 2015	OSSOS	15	✓ CEN	✓ CEN	✓ R	21.1	0.4	1.6	12.2	30.1	3.9	(U:2)	MPC · JPL
2015 GK_{59}	12 Apr 2015	OSSOS	13	✓ CEN	✓ CEN	✗	11.6	0.4	7.4	7.2	16	3.19	(U:8)	MPC · JPL
2015 GV_{55}	12 Apr 2015	OSSOS	168	✗ TNO	✓ CEN	✓ R	31.3	0.3	28.4	21.8	40.7	4.28	—	MPC · JPL
2015 GX_{55}	13 Apr 2015	OSSOS	73	✗ TNO	✓ CEN	✓ R	180.1	0.9	53.4	14.7	342.1	3.08	—	MPC · JPL
2015 GY_{53}	12 Apr 2015	OSSOS	11	✓ CEN	✓ CEN	✓ R	12.1	0.1	24.1	11.1	13	3.2	(U:3)	MPC · JPL
2015 HN_{142}	23 Apr 2015	Pan-STARRS	1.0	✓ CEN	✗ UMP	✗	7.5	0.8	2.9	1.8	13.1	2.27	SSBN07: not a centaur; (U:9)	MPC · JPL
2015 HO_{176}	19 Apr 2015	Space Surveillance Telescope	2.6	✓ CEN	✗ UMP	✗	5.6	0.6	8.9	2.4	8.9	2.6	SSBN07: not a centaur; (U:2)	MPC · JPL
2015 HX_{10}	18 Apr 2015	CTIO-DECam	19	✓ CEN	✓ CEN	✓ R	16.2	0.3	31.6	10.7	21.7	3.15	(U:3)	MPC · JPL
2015 JH_{1}	11 May 2015	Pan-STARRS	12	✓ CEN	✗ UMP	✗	12.3	0.7	35.4	3.6	21	2.19	SSBN07: not a centaur; (U:0); MPC: Other UMP	MPC · JPL
2015 KC_{87}	21 May 2015	Pan-STARRS	1.4	✓ CEN	✗ UMP	✗	5.8	0.7	14	1.9	9.7	2.43	SSBN07: not a centaur; (U:9)	MPC · JPL
2015 KH_{172}	21 May 2015	OSSOS	6	✓ CEN	✓ CEN	✓ R	17.2	0.7	9.1	5.4	29	2.92	SSBN07: not a centaur; (U:2)	MPC · JPL
2015 KJ_{87}	21 May 2015	Pan-STARRS	1.3	✓ CEN	✗ DAM	✗	12	0.9	8.2	1.4	22.6	1.83	SSBN07: not a centaur; (U:9)	MPC · JPL
2015 KJ_{153}	25 May 2015	Pan-STARRS	4	✓ CEN	✗ UMP	✗	6.4	0.6	17.9	2.7	10	2.54	SSBN07: not a centaur; (U:1); MPC: Other UMP	MPC · JPL
2015 KJ_{172}	24 May 2015	OSSOS	6	✓ CEN	✓ CEN	✓ R	11	0.5	11.4	5.8	16.1	2.99	SSBN07: not a centaur; (U:3)	MPC · JPL
2015 KR_{174}	21 May 2015	OSSOS	15	✗ TNO	✓ CEN	✓ R	89.8	0.8	38.7	11.2	161.6	3.95	—	MPC · JPL
2015 KS_{174}	24 May 2015	OSSOS	42	✗ TNO	✓ CEN	✓ R	32.5	0.2	7	25.2	39	5.02	—	MPC · JPL
2015 KX_{102}	21 May 2015	Pan-STARRS	2.0	✓ CEN	✗ UMP	✗	6.3	0.7	11.3	2	10.6	2.4	SSBN07: not a centaur; (U:9)	MPC · JPL
2015 MY_{90}	21 Jun 2015	Pan-STARRS	4	✓ CEN	✗ UMP	✗	5.7	0.5	10.6	2.7	8.7	2.67	SSBN07: not a centaur; (U:1)	MPC · JPL
2015 PG_{119}	10 Aug 2015	Pan-STARRS	4	✓ CEN	✗ UMP	✗	5.7	0.4	16.2	3.5	7.9	2.77	SSBN07: not a centaur; (U:1)	MPC · JPL
2015 PJ_{311}	10 Aug 2015	Pan-STARRS	11	✓ CEN	✓ CEN	✓ R	20.8	0.7	18.5	6.9	34.7	3.07	(U:0)	MPC · JPL
2015 PZ_{315}	15 Aug 2015	S. S. Sheppard	193	✗ TNO	✓ CEN	✗	84.6	0.6	4.4	28.4	135.4	6.5	—	MPC · JPL
2015 QW_{23}	18 Aug 2015	Cerro Tololo Obs.	368	✗ TNO	✓ CEN	✗	33	0.5	28.8	14	49.5	3.98	—	MPC · JPL
2015 RA_{279}	8 Sep 2015	OSSOS	168	✗ TNO	✓ CEN	✓ R	60.1	0.6	30.2	18.8	96.2	4.79	—	MPC · JPL
2015 RA_{333}	12 Sep 2015	Pan-STARRS	3	✓ CEN	✗ UMP	✗	6.8	0.6	14	3	10.5	2.6	SSBN07: not a centaur; (U:2)	MPC · JPL
2015 RC_{279}	9 Sep 2015	OSSOS	57	✗ TNO	✗ SDO	✓ S	104.2	0.6	18	31.6	166.7	6.86	—	MPC · JPL
2015 RD_{277}	8 Sep 2015	OSSOS	42	✓ CEN	✓ CEN	✓ R	26.2	0.3	18.8	18.5	33.9	4.26	(U:2)	MPC · JPL
2015 RD_{279}	9 Sep 2015	OSSOS	52	✗ TNO	✗ SDO	✓ R	51.3	0.4	15.1	30.8	71.8	5.66	—	MPC · JPL
2015 RE_{277}	8 Sep 2015	Mauna Kea Obs.	2.9	✓ CEN	✗ UMP	✗	20.2	0.8	1.6	4.8	35.7	2.8	SSBN07: not a centaur; (U:1); MPC: Other UMP	MPC · JPL
2015 RF_{277}	8 Sep 2015	OSSOS	7	✓ CEN	✓ CEN	✓ R	21.8	0.5	0.9	10.4	33.3	3.73	(U:2)	MPC · JPL
2015 RH_{277}	9 Sep 2015	OSSOS	12	✓ CEN	✓ CEN	✓ R	21	0.5	10.1	10.3	31.7	3.65	(U:5)	MPC · JPL
2015 RK_{277}	9 Sep 2015	OSSOS	5	✓ CEN	✓ CEN	✓ R	26.6	0.8	9.6	5.3	48	2.86	SSBN07: not a centaur; (U:1)	MPC · JPL
2015 RL_{277}	9 Sep 2015	Mauna Kea Obs.	3	✗ TNO	✓ CEN	✓ R	35	0.8	3.1	5.2	63	3.26	MPC: Other UMP	MPC · JPL
2015 RU_{245}	8 Sep 2015	OSSOS	77	✗ TNO	✓ CEN	✓ R	31.3	0.2	13.7	22	37.5	4.83	—	MPC · JPL
2015 RV_{245}	9 Sep 2015	OSSOS	53	✓ CEN	✓ CEN	✓ R	22.1	0.5	15.3	11.5	32.7	3.73	(U:1)	MPC · JPL
2015 RW_{245}	9 Sep 2015	OSSOS	97	✗ TNO	✓ CEN	✓ R	57.3	0.5	13.3	26.4	85.9	5.68	—	MPC · JPL
2015 RY_{245}	9 Sep 2015	OSSOS	63	✗ TNO	✗ SDO	✓ R	241.2	0.8	6	31.3	434.1	8.15	—	MPC · JPL
2015 SP_{20}	17 Sep 2015	Calar Alto Obs.	351	✗ TNO	✓ CEN	✗	65.7	0.5	3.1	28.3	98.5	6.22	—	MPC · JPL
2015 SP_{21}	19 Sep 2015	Calar Alto Obs.	161	✗ TNO	✓ CEN	✗	32.4	0.1	38	28.9	35.7	4.07	—	MPC · JPL
2015 TH367	13 Oct 2015	S. S. Sheppard	266	✗ TNO	✓ CEN	✗	85.2	0.6	11	29.1	136.4	6.42	—	MPC · JPL
2015 TM_{240}	10 Oct 2015	SST	1.1	✓ CEN	✗ DAM	✗	8.1	0.8	10.5	1.3	14.8	1.99	SSBN07: not a centaur; (U:9)	MPC · JPL
2015 TP_{10}	2 Oct 2015	Pan-STARRS	1.7	✓ CEN	✗ DAM	✗	14.2	0.9	37.9	1.4	27	1.49	SSBN07: not a centaur; (U:9)	MPC · JPL
2015 TP_{454}	7 Oct 2015	CTIO-DECam	231	✗ TNO	✓ CEN	✓ R	67.3	0.5	24.1	27.8	100.9	5.76	—	MPC · JPL
2015 TS_{350}	15 Oct 2015	Pan-STARRS	13	✗ TNO	✓ CEN	✓ R	144.8	0.9	58	5	275.2	2.48	SSBN07: not a centaur MPC: Other UMP	MPC · JPL
2015 UH_{67}	19 Oct 2015	Pan-STARRS	12	✓ CEN	✓ CEN	✓ R	7.8	0.1	27.4	6.6	9	2.82	SSBN07: not a centaur; (U:2)	MPC · JPL
2015 VD_{168}	7 Nov 2015	OSSOS	134	✗ TNO	✓ CEN	✓ R	118.1	0.7	22.5	25.6	200.7	6.33	—	MPC · JPL
2015 VE_{164}	6 Nov 2015	OSSOS	23	✓ CEN	✓ CEN	✓ R	28.6	0.5	36.5	15.5	41.7	3.53	(U:3)	MPC · JPL
2015 VF_{164}	7 Nov 2015	OSSOS	15	✓ CEN	✓ CEN	✓ R	28.2	0.5	5.7	12.9	43.6	4.08	(U:0)	MPC · JPL
2015 VF_{168}	7 Nov 2015	OSSOS	48	✗ TNO	✓ CEN	✓ R	41.2	0.3	34.8	28.6	53.5	4.53	—	MPC · JPL
2015 VH_{105}	1 Nov 2015	Pan-STARRS	1.7	✓ CEN	✗ UMP	✗	5.9	0.8	29.5	1.5	10.4	2.1	SSBN07: not a centaur; (U:7)	MPC · JPL
2015 VQ_{207}	5 Nov 2015	CTIO-DECam	62	✗ TNO	✗ SDO	✓ S	154.6	0.7	28.5	31.3	262.8	6.87	—	MPC · JPL
2015 VT_{152}	6 Nov 2015	CTIO-DECam	73	✓ CEN	✓ CEN	✓ R	20.1	0.2	39.6	15.4	24.8	3.2	(U:3)	MPC · JPL
2015 VV_{1}	2 Nov 2015	Pan-STARRS	24	✓ CEN	✓ CEN	✓ R	23.5	0.7	17.1	8.2	38.8	3.3	(U:0)	MPC · JPL
2015 VY_{184}	7 Nov 2015	Mauna Kea Obs.	61	✗ TNO	✓ CEN	✗	83.4	0.7	26.9	18.3	141.7	5.16	—	MPC · JPL
2015 VZ_{167}	6 Nov 2015	OSSOS	31	✗ TNO	✓ CEN	✓ R	33.7	0.5	15.4	15.9	50.6	4.4	—	MPC · JPL
2015 XQ_{384}	7 Dec 2015	Pan-STARRS	4	✓ CEN	✗ UMP	✗	12.7	0.6	21.5	4.4	20.9	2.62	SSBN07: not a centaur; (U:5); MPC: Other UMP	MPC · JPL
2015 XX_{351}	9 Dec 2015	Pan-STARRS	4	✓ CEN	✗ DAM	✗	14.5	0.9	159.2	2.1	26.8	-1.27	SSBN07: not a centaur; (U:0); MPC: Other UMP	MPC · JPL
2015 YY_{18}	29 Dec 2015	Pan-STARRS	6	✓ CEN	✗ DAM	✗	19.3	0.8	118.3	3.3	35.4	-0.75	SSBN07: not a centaur; (U:0); MPC: Other UMP	MPC · JPL
2016 AC_{282}	2 Jan 2016	MLS	4	✓ CEN	✗ UMP	✗	6.1	0.4	26.1	3.5	8.7	2.61	SSBN07: not a centaur; (U:3); MPC: Other UMP	MPC · JPL
2016 AH_{350}	12 Jan 2016	Pan-STARRS	3.9	✓ CEN	✗	✗	5.6	0.3	15.4	3.8	7.4	2.83	SSBN07: not a centaur; (U:1)	MPC · JPL
2016 BJ_{81}	28 Jan 2016	MLS	11	✓ CEN	✓ CEN	✓ R	9.6	0.5	13.3	5	14.3	2.86	SSBN07: not a centaur; (U:0); MPC: Other UMP	MPC · JPL
2016 CD_{93}	5 Feb 2016	Pan-STARRS	2.0	✓ CEN	✗ DAM	✗	29.1	0.9	12.2	1.9	56.3	1.81	SSBN07: not a centaur; (U:9)	MPC · JPL
2016 DF_{2}	28 Feb 2016	Pan-STARRS	2.5	✓ CEN	✗ DAM	✗	6.2	0.5	166.9	3.3	9.2	-1.05	SSBN07: not a centaur; (U:9); MPC: Other UMP	MPC · JPL
2016 FD_{14}	28 Mar 2016	CTIO-DECam	21	✓ CEN	✓ CEN	✓ R	21.5	0.5	20	10.5	32.5	3.53	(U:0)	MPC · JPL
2016 FK_{59}	28 Mar 2016	CTIO-DECam	56	✗ TNO	✓ CEN	✗	41.9	0.3	27.6	26	54.4	4.92	—	MPC · JPL
2016 GC_{241}	1 Apr 2016	Pan-STARRS	34	✓ CEN	✓ CEN	✓ R	21.6	0.4	4.2	13.8	29.4	4.03	(U:0)	MPC · JPL
2016 GE_{53}	1 Apr 2016	Pan-STARRS	2.7	✓ CEN	✗ DAM	✗	10.8	0.9	0.6	1.3	20.2	1.87	SSBN07: not a centaur; (U:9)	MPC · JPL
2016 GF_{70}	1 Apr 2016	Pan-STARRS	1.3	✓ CEN	✗ DAM	✗	21	0.9	14.1	1.4	40.6	1.63	SSBN07: not a centaur; (U:9)	MPC · JPL
2016 GT_{7}	1 Apr 2016	MLS	1.0	✓ CEN	✗ UMP	✗	7.2	0.7	7.7	1.9	12.6	2.29	SSBN07: not a centaur; (U:9)	MPC · JPL
2016 GU_{4}	1 Apr 2016	MLS	1.5	✓ CEN	✗ UMP	✗	5.7	0.7	13.9	1.9	9.5	2.44	SSBN07: not a centaur; (U:9)	MPC · JPL
2016 GU_{34}	1 Apr 2016	Pan-STARRS	0.8	✓ CEN	✗ UMP	✗	6.3	0.8	2	1.4	11.2	2.22	SSBN07: not a centaur; (U:9)	MPC · JPL
2016 GV_{83}	1 Apr 2016	Pan-STARRS	1.3	✓ CEN	✗ DAM	✗	23.2	0.9	11.8	1.4	45	1.66	SSBN07: not a centaur; (U:9)	MPC · JPL
2016 GZ_{120}	1 Apr 2016	Pan-STARRS	1.8	✓ CEN	✗ UMP	✗	10.7	0.8	10.5	1.8	19.6	2.05	SSBN07: not a centaur; (U:9)	MPC · JPL
2016 GZ_{251}	1 Apr 2016	Pan-STARRS	34	✓ CEN	✓ CEN	✓ R	17.8	0.4	29.4	10.2	25.5	3.21	(U:0)	MPC · JPL
2016 JK_{24}	3 Mar 2016	Pan-STARRS	12	✓ CEN	✗ DAM	✗	13	0.7	152.3	4.4	21.6	-1.7	SSBN07: not a centaur; (U:1)	MPC · JPL
2016 KX_{4}	30 May 2016	Pan-STARRS	6	✓ CEN	✗ UMP	✗	7	0.7	37.5	2.3	11.8	2.1	SSBN07: not a centaur; (U:1); MPC: Other UMP	MPC · JPL
2016 LF_{89}	9 Jun 2016	Mauna Kea Obs.	40	✓ CEN	✓ CEN	✗	20.9	0	44.3	19.9	21.8	3.11	(U:E)	MPC · JPL
2016 LF_{90}	9 Jun 2016	Mauna Kea Obs.	5	✗ TNO	✓ CEN	✗	39.4	0.7	79.6	8.7	67	0.84	—	MPC · JPL
2016 LK_{90}	9 Jun 2016	Mauna Kea Obs.	14	✓ CEN	✓ CEN	✗	16.4	0.1	32.6	15.2	17.6	3.3	(U:E)	MPC · JPL
2016 LO_{89}	9 Jun 2016	Mauna Kea Obs.	11	✓ CEN	✓ CEN	✗	13.1	0.1	40.3	12	14.3	2.81	(U:E)	MPC · JPL
2016 LR_{88}	9 Jun 2016	Mauna Kea Obs.	34	✓ CEN	✓ CEN	✗	28.9	0.3	55.3	19.6	38.1	2.72	(U:E)	MPC · JPL
2016 LS	1 Jun 2016	Pan-STARRS	12	✓ CEN	✓ CEN	✓ R	13.3	0.6	114.3	5.3	21.4	-0.66	SSBN07: not a centaur; (U:0); MPC: Other UMP	MPC · JPL
2016 ND_{21}	6 Jul 2016	ATLAS-HKO	20	✓ CEN	✗ UMP	✗	8.5	0.6	21.8	3.8	13.2	2.58	SSBN07: not a centaur; (U:0); MPC: Other UMP	MPC · JPL
2016 NL_{100}	5 Jul 2016	Pan-STARRS	3	✓ CEN	✗ UMP	✗	13.9	0.8	21.9	3.3	24.5	2.34	SSBN07: not a centaur; (U:2); MPC: Other UMP	MPC · JPL
2016 PW_{84}	3 Aug 2016	Pan-STARRS	5.3	✓ CEN	✗	✗	5.8	0.3	14.5	4.2	7.4	2.86	SSBN07: not a centaur; (U:1)	MPC · JPL
2016 QB_{135}	26 Aug 2016	CTIO-DECam	134	✗ TNO	✓ CEN	✓ R	33.4	0.1	15	29.9	36.7	5.02	—	MPC · JPL
2016 QF_{86}	23 Aug 2016	CTIO-DECam	116	✓ CEN	✓ CEN	✓ R	21.2	0.3	13.6	14.7	27.7	3.98	(U:3)	MPC · JPL
2016 SR_{105}	22 Sep 2016	CTIO-DECam	117	✗ TNO	✓ CEN	✓ R	46.7	0.5	18.7	19.5	70.1	5.03	—	MPC · JPL
2016 SS_{46}	22 Sep 2016	CTIO-DECam	74	✗ TNO	✗ TNO	✓ R	40.8	0.2	15	30.5	49	5.43	—	MPC · JPL
2016 TK_{2}	13 Jul 2016	MLS	6	✓ CEN	✗ DAM	✗	9.2	0.6	92.4	4.1	14.3	0.47	SSBN07: not a centaur; (U:2); MPC: Other UMP	MPC · JPL
2016 TP_{34}	6 Oct 2016	Pan-STARRS	1.7	✓ CEN	✗ UMP	✗	5.9	0.7	14.2	1.6	10.3	2.29	SSBN07: not a centaur; (U:9)	MPC · JPL
2016 TP_{93}	9 Oct 2016	Pan-STARRS	4	✓ CEN	✗ DAM	✗	7.4	0.6	138.3	3.3	11.5	-0.78	SSBN07: not a centaur; (U:2); MPC: Other UMP	MPC · JPL
2016 TT_{100}	13 Oct 2016	Spacewatch	6	✓ CEN	✗ UMP	✗	8.9	0.6	9.7	3.7	14.1	2.67	SSBN07: not a centaur; (U:0); MPC: Other UMP	MPC · JPL
2016 UC_{176}	28 Oct 2016	Pan-STARRS	1.3	✓ CEN	✗ UMP	✗	6.7	0.7	2.5	2.1	11.3	2.41	SSBN07: not a centaur; (U:9)	MPC · JPL
2016 UC_{222}	27 Oct 2016	Pan-STARRS	0.9	✓ CEN	✗ UMP	✗	5.6	0.7	18.4	1.9	9.4	2.39	SSBN07: not a centaur; (U:9)	MPC · JPL
2016 UG_{245}	28 Oct 2016	Pan-STARRS	1.4	✓ CEN	✗ UMP	✗	8.5	0.8	2.3	1.4	15.5	2.04	SSBN07: not a centaur; (U:9)	MPC · JPL
2016 UK_{212}	28 Oct 2016	Pan-STARRS	1.0	✓ CEN	✗ DAM	✗	29.7	1	2.3	1.5	57.9	1.66	SSBN07: not a centaur; (U:9)	MPC · JPL
2016 UK_{219}	26 Oct 2016	Pan-STARRS	1.2	✓ CEN	✗ UMP	✗	5.6	0.7	10.7	1.5	9.8	2.31	SSBN07: not a centaur; (U:9)	MPC · JPL
2016 UN_{233}	28 Oct 2016	Pan-STARRS	1.1	✓ CEN	✗ DAM	✗	24.9	0.9	1.4	1.6	48.2	1.74	SSBN07: not a centaur; (U:9)	MPC · JPL
2016 UP_{173}	27 Oct 2016	Pan-STARRS	1.9	✓ CEN	✗ UMP	✗	6.7	0.7	29.4	1.7	11.8	2.08	SSBN07: not a centaur; (U:9)	MPC · JPL
2016 UP_{210}	27 Oct 2016	Pan-STARRS	0.8	✓ CEN	✗ UMP	✗	6.4	0.8	5.1	1.4	11.5	2.2	SSBN07: not a centaur; (U:9)	MPC · JPL
2016 UP_{273}	28 Oct 2016	CTIO-DECam	61	✗ TNO	✗ SDO	✓ R	84.3	0.6	14	31.6	134.9	6.31	—	MPC · JPL
2016 US_{244}	28 Oct 2016	Pan-STARRS	0.9	✓ CEN	✗ UMP	✗	6.6	0.8	7.9	1.5	11.7	2.2	SSBN07: not a centaur; (U:9)	MPC · JPL
2016 UV_{231}	27 Oct 2016	Pan-STARRS	0.7	✓ CEN	✗ UMP	✗	5.6	0.7	20	1.4	9.8	2.23	SSBN07: not a centaur; (U:9)	MPC · JPL
2016 UW_{222}	28 Oct 2016	Pan-STARRS	0.8	✓ CEN	✗ UMP	✗	6.1	0.7	1.4	1.7	10.5	2.35	SSBN07: not a centaur; (U:9)	MPC · JPL
2016 VF_{1}	5 Nov 2016	Pan-STARRS	10	✓ CEN	✓ CEN	✓ R	8	0.1	22.5	6.9	9.2	2.92	SSBN07: not a centaur; (U:0)	MPC · JPL
2016 VY_{17}	5 Nov 2016	MLS	4	✓ CEN	✗ DAM	✗	11.2	0.9	148.5	1.7	20.6	-0.85	SSBN07: not a centaur; (U:0); MPC: Other UMP	MPC · JPL
2016 WS_{1}	17 Nov 2016	WISE	2.1	✓ CEN	✗ DAM	✗	14.3	0.9	53.1	1.7	27	1.3	SSBN07: not a centaur; (U:3); MPC: Other UMP	MPC · JPL
2017 AO_{19}	7 Jan 2017	MLS	1.7	✓ CEN	✗ UMP	✗	6.6	0.7	23.7	2	11.2	2.28	SSBN07: not a centaur; (U:3); MPC: Other UMP	MPC · JPL
2017 AX_{13}	2 Jan 2017	Pan-STARRS	6	✓ CEN	✗ DAM	✗	28.7	0.9	137.2	3.3	54	-1.43	SSBN07: not a centaur; (U:0); MPC: Other UMP	MPC · JPL
2017 AZ_{8}	3 Jan 2017	Pan-STARRS	0.8	✓ CEN	✗ UMP	✗	6.5	0.8	13.9	1.4	11.6	2.16	SSBN07: not a centaur; (U:9)	MPC · JPL
2017 BA_{94}	31 Jan 2017	Pan-STARRS	1.9	✓ CEN	✗ UMP	✗	6.5	0.6	19.2	2.3	10.6	2.42	SSBN07: not a centaur; (U:4); MPC: Other UMP	MPC · JPL
2017 DO_{121}	24 Feb 2017	Mauna Kea Obs.	168	✗ TNO	✓ CEN	✗	177.1	0.8	16	26.5	318.9	6.76	—	MPC · JPL
2017 FM_{99}	25 Mar 2017	Pan-STARRS	4	✓ CEN	✗ UMP	✗	8.2	0.7	19.6	2.8	13.6	2.41	SSBN07: not a centaur; (U:2); MPC: Other UMP	MPC · JPL
2017 FP_{50}	19 Mar 2017	Pan-STARRS	5	✓ CEN	✗ UMP	✗	5.7	0.4	20.4	3.4	8	2.71	SSBN07: not a centaur; (U:3)	MPC · JPL
2017 GC_{8}	1 Apr 2017	Pan-STARRS	1.4	✓ CEN	✗ UMP	✗	10.2	0.7	6.5	2.6	17.8	2.38	SSBN07: not a centaur; (U:3); MPC: Other UMP	MPC · JPL
2017 GY_{8}	3 Apr 2017	Pan-STARRS	13	✓ CEN	✓ CEN	✓ R	26.3	0.7	13.6	8.4	44.2	3.4	(U:0)	MPC · JPL
2017 GZ_{8}	3 Apr 2017	MLS	8	✓ CEN	✗ UMP	✗	7.6	0.5	5.5	3.9	11.2	2.8	SSBN07: not a centaur; (U:2); MPC: Other UMP	MPC · JPL
2017 NM_{2}	6 Jul 2017	Pan-STARRS	12	✓ CEN	✓ CEN	✓ R	14.6	0.6	101.3	5.5	23.7	-0.16	SSBN07: not a centaur; (U:1)	MPC · JPL
2017 PY_{24}	7 Aug 2017	Pan-STARRS	1.6	✓ CEN	✗ DAM	✗	17.4	0.9	71.8	1.3	33.5	0.73	SSBN07: not a centaur; (U:1)	MPC · JPL
2017 QF_{33}	16 Aug 2017	Pan-STARRS	13	✓ CEN	✓ CEN	✓ R	25.4	0.7	3.3	6.6	44.1	3.17	(U:0)	MPC · JPL
2017 QK_{71}	31 Aug 2017	MLS	1.8	✓ CEN	✗ UMP	✗	6.2	0.6	23.2	2.5	9.9	2.45	SSBN07: not a centaur; (U:3)	MPC · JPL
2017 QO_{100}	20 Aug 2017	Pan-STARRS	4	✓ CEN	✗ UMP	✗	5.8	0.5	9.1	2.9	8.6	2.7	SSBN07: not a centaur; (U:3)	MPC · JPL
2017 QU_{10}	17 Aug 2017		1.5	✓ CEN	✗ UMP	✗	5.7	0.7	9.7	1.8	9.6	2.43	SSBN07: not a centaur; (U:9)	MPC · JPL
2017 QW_{46}	17 Aug 2017		1.4	✓ CEN	✗ UMP	✗	9	0.8	5.1	1.8	16.2	2.15	SSBN07: not a centaur; (U:9)	MPC · JPL
2017 RF_{16}	12 Sep 2017	Pan-STARRS	1.8	✓ CEN	✗ UMP	✗	6.9	0.6	20.5	2.5	11.3	2.42	SSBN07: not a centaur; (U:4)	MPC · JPL
2017 RR_{2}	14 Sep 2017	Pan-STARRS	2.0	✓ CEN	✗ DAM	✗	11.6	0.8	87.1	2.5	20.7	0.54	SSBN07: not a centaur; (U:2); MPC: Other UMP	MPC · JPL
2017 SV_{13}	17 Sep 2017	Pan-STARRS	1.4	✓ CEN	✗ DAM	✗	9.6	0.8	113.3	2	17.3	-0.12	SSBN07: not a centaur; (U:4); MPC: Other UMP	MPC · JPL
2017 SW_{11}	21 Sep 2017	Pan-STARRS	16	✓ CEN	✗ UMP	✗	9.8	0.5	16.2	4.7	14.8	2.78	SSBN07: not a centaur; (U:1); MPC: Other UMP	MPC · JPL
2017 UX_{51}	27 Oct 2017	Pan-STARRS	35	✗ TNO	✓ CEN	✓ R	30.1	0.7	90.5	7.6	51.2	0.15	—	MPC · JPL
2017 WW_{14}	21 Nov 2017	Pan-STARRS	9	✓ CEN	✓ CEN	✓ R	22.9	0.7	6	5.8	40	2.99	SSBN07: not a centaur; (U:0)	MPC · JPL
2017 YG_{5}	23 Dec 2017	Pan-STARRS	18	✗ TNO	✓ CEN	✓ R	66.2	0.8	23.7	7.4	119.2	4	—	MPC · JPL
2017 YL_{2}	19 Dec 2017	WISE	3	✓ CEN	✗ UMP	✗	8.9	0.8	27.9	2.1	15.7	2.07	SSBN07: not a centaur; (U:2); MPC: Other UMP	MPC · JPL
2018 AF_{8}	10 Jan 2018	Pan-STARRS	4	✓ CEN	✗ DAM	✗	8.4	0.6	52.8	3.5	13.2	1.87	SSBN07: not a centaur; (U:3)	MPC · JPL
2018 AG37	15 Jan 2018	Mauna Kea Obs.	797	✗ TNO	✓ CEN	✓ R	80.9	0.6	18.6	27.4	129.4	6.04	—	MPC · JPL
2018 AK_{39}	15 Jan 2018	Mauna Kea Obs.	279	✗ TNO	✓ CEN	✓ R	51.3	0.4	15.5	27.3	71.9	5.65	—	MPC · JPL
2018 AN_{25}	13 Jan 2018	MLS	3	✓ CEN	✗ UMP	✗	5.8	0.5	12.4	3	8.5	2.7	SSBN07: not a centaur; (U:2)	MPC · JPL
2018 AS_{18}	13 Jan 2018	CSS	4	✓ CEN	✗ DAM	✗	12.9	0.9	63	1.7	24.2	1.11	SSBN07: not a centaur; (U:1)	MPC · JPL
2018 EG_{4}	7 Mar 2018	Pan-STARRS	5	✓ CEN	✗ UMP	✗	13.2	0.7	17.5	4.4	21.9	2.66	SSBN07: not a centaur; (U:6); MPC: Other UMP	MPC · JPL
2018 HE_{3}	16 Apr 2018	Paranal Obs.	1.4	✓ CEN	✗ UMP	✗	7	0.8	13.6	1.7	12.2	2.21	SSBN07: not a centaur; (U:9)	MPC · JPL
2018 MO_{8}	16 Jun 2018	Pan-STARRS	12	✓ CEN	✗ DAM	✓ R	15.1	0.7	51.5	5	25.1	1.92	SSBN07: not a centaur; (U:0); MPC: Other UMP	MPC · JPL
2018 PL_{28}	7 Aug 2018	Pan-STARRS	6	✓ CEN	✗ DAM	✗	19.5	0.9	74.1	2.7	36.3	0.8	SSBN07: not a centaur; (U:2); MPC: Other UMP	MPC · JPL
2018 PQ_{18}	8 Aug 2018	Paranal Obs.	0.7	✓ CEN	✗ UMP	✗	9	0.8	1.2	1.7	16.2	2.13	SSBN07: not a centaur; (U:9)	MPC · JPL
2018 RG_{39}	9 Sep 2018	MLS	6	✓ CEN	✗ UMP	✗	5.8	0.5	15.9	2.8	8.9	2.62	SSBN07: not a centaur; (U:0)	MPC · JPL
2018 TL_{6}	5 Oct 2018	MLS	0.6	✓ CEN	✗ DAM	✗	8.3	0.8	170.9	1.7	14.8	-0.9	SSBN07: not a centaur; (U:5); MPC: Other UMP	MPC · JPL
2018 UB_{1}	17 Oct 2018	Pan-STARRS	8	✓ CEN	✗ UMP	✗	7.7	0.5	19.4	3.7	11.6	2.64	SSBN07: not a centaur; (U:3); MPC: Other UMP	MPC · JPL
2018 WB_{1}	19 Nov 2018	MLS	2.0	✓ CEN	✗ DAM	✗	7.2	0.7	152.3	2.2	12.3	-0.79	SSBN07: not a centaur; (U:1); MPC: Other UMP	MPC · JPL
2018 XV_{35}	14 Dec 2018	Pan-STARRS	3.4	✓ CEN	✗	✗	5.6	0.3	4.5	3.7	7.5	2.87	SSBN07: not a centaur; (U:2)	MPC · JPL
2019 AH_{54}	14 Jan 2019	Pan-STARRS	6	✓ CEN	✗ UMP	✗	10.1	0.7	11.3	3.3	16.9	2.55	SSBN07: not a centaur; (U:0); MPC: Other UMP	MPC · JPL
2019 AK_{54}	8 Jan 2019	Pan-STARRS	8	✓ CEN	✗ UMP	✗	11.1	0.6	31.6	4.5	17.6	2.47	SSBN07: not a centaur; (U:2)	MPC · JPL
2019 GG_{23}	5 Apr 2019	KMT-CTIO	1.8	✓ CEN	✗ UMP	✗	6.1	0.3	1.3	4.4	7.9	2.93	SSBN07: not a centaur; (U:9); MPC: Other UMP	MPC · JPL
2019 GN_{22}	5 Apr 2019	KMT-CTIO	32	✓ CEN	✓ CEN	✓ R	20	0.4	9.1	11.4	28.5	3.75	(U:1)	MPC · JPL
2019 GO_{22}	5 Apr 2019	KMT	2.8	✓ CEN	✗	✗	5.5	0.1	13.9	4.7	6.3	2.92	SSBN07: not a centaur; (U:9)	MPC · JPL
2019 HC_{4}	27 Apr 2019	MLS	6	✓ CEN	✗ DAM	✗	8.8	0.6	134.3	3.9	13.7	-0.92	SSBN07: not a centaur; (U:2); MPC: Other UMP	MPC · JPL
2019 KE_{7}	26 May 2019	MLS	6	✓ CEN	✗ DAM	✗	11.7	0.7	108.3	3.5	19.9	-0.22	SSBN07: not a centaur; (U:2); MPC: Other UMP	MPC · JPL
2019 KF_{7}	31 May 2019	ZTF	6	✓ CEN	✗ UMP	✗	6.1	0.5	5.2	2.9	9.4	2.69	SSBN07: not a centaur; (U:2); MPC: Other UMP	MPC · JPL
2019 KN_{19}	25 May 2019	Pan-STARRS	9	✓ CEN	✓ CEN	✗	12.4	0.8	14.8	2.9	21.9	2.34	SSBN07: not a centaur; (U:1)	MPC · JPL
2019 KV_{42}	31 May 2019	Pan-STARRS	8	✓ CEN	✗ UMP	✗	11.2	0.6	20.4	4.8	17.5	2.73	SSBN07: not a centaur; (U:4); MPC: Other UMP	MPC · JPL
2019 KY_{22}	30 May 2019	Pan-STARRS	6	✓ CEN	✗ UMP	✗	6.3	0.3	27.3	4.6	8	2.71	SSBN07: not a centaur; (U:0)	MPC · JPL
2019 PN_{2}	5 Aug 2019	Pan-STARRS	3	✓ CEN	✗ DAM	✗	25.1	0.9	113	2	48.3	-0.47	SSBN07: not a centaur; (U:1); MPC: Other UMP	MPC · JPL
2019 QQ_{8}	28 Aug 2019	Pan-STARRS	10	✗ TNO	✓ CEN	✓ R	61.8	0.8	23.6	6.8	111.3	3.87	—	MPC · JPL
2019 QR_{60}	28 Aug 2019	Pan-STARRS	3.4	✓ CEN	✗	✗	5.6	0.2	1.7	4.5	6.7	2.96	SSBN07: not a centaur; (U:8)	MPC · JPL
2019 RF_{13}	4 Sep 2019	MLS	4	✓ CEN	✗ UMP	✗	5.8	0.4	32.4	3.7	8	2.55	SSBN07: not a centaur; (U:3)	MPC · JPL
2019 RJ_{2}	3 Sep 2019	MLS	10	✓ CEN	✓ CEN	✓ R	9.8	0.5	23.1	5.1	14.5	2.74	SSBN07: not a centaur; (U:2); MPC: Other UMP	MPC · JPL
2019 RZ_{16}	6 Sep 2019	Pan-STARRS	3	✓ CEN	✗ UMP	✗	6.7	0.7	4.6	2.3	11	2.49	SSBN07: not a centaur; (U:4); MPC: Other UMP	MPC · JPL
2019 SE_{17}	22 Sep 2019	MLS	2.0	✓ CEN	✗ UMP	✗	6.3	0.6	34.5	2.5	10	2.27	SSBN07: not a centaur; (U:3)	MPC · JPL
2019 SH_{187}	24 Sep 2019	Cerro Tololo Obs.	37	✓ CEN	✓ CEN	✓ R	17.6	0.1	15	16	19.1	3.83	(U:3)	MPC · JPL
2019 SO_{48}	24 Sep 2019	Pan-STARRS	1.2	✓ CEN	✗ UMP	✗	5.7	0.7	2.9	1.8	9.6	2.45	SSBN07: not a centaur; (U:5)	MPC · JPL
2019 SS_{79}	30 Sep 2019	Pan-STARRS	6	✓ CEN	✗ UMP	✗	7.7	0.6	18.9	3.3	12.1	2.56	SSBN07: not a centaur; (U:2)	MPC · JPL
2019 TG_{3}	5 Oct 2019	Pan-STARRS	23	✓ CEN	✓ CEN	✓ R	21	0.5	10.8	10.1	32	3.62	(U:2)	MPC · JPL
2019 TL_{8}	14 Oct 2019	Pan-STARRS	9	✓ CEN	✓ CEN	✓ R	10.8	0.5	24.6	5.6	15.9	2.78	SSBN07: not a centaur; (U:3)	MPC · JPL
2019 TX_{7}	7 Oct 2019	Pan-STARRS	10	✗ TNO	✓ CEN	✓ R	33.2	0.8	4.9	6.6	59.8	3.18	—	MPC · JPL
2019 UH_{12}	27 Oct 2019	Pan-STARRS	40	✗ TNO	✓ CEN	✓ R	52.9	0.8	47	7.9	95.3	2.71	—	MPC · JPL
2019 UL_{14}	27 Oct 2019	Pan-STARRS	4	✓ CEN	✗ UMP	✗	10.1	0.5	19	4.9	15.2	2.77	SSBN07: not a centaur; (U:5); MPC: Other UMP	MPC · JPL
2019 UO_{14}	23 Oct 2019	Pan-STARRS	12	✓ CEN	✓ CEN	✓ R	9.8	0.2	32.9	7.5	12.1	2.77	(U:2)	MPC · JPL
2019 UT_{75}	24 Oct 2019	Pan-STARRS	0.9	✓ CEN	✗ UMP	✗	7.6	0.8	5.2	1.7	13.5	2.19	SSBN07: not a centaur; (U:E); MPC: Other UMP	MPC · JPL
2019 UV_{77}	25 Oct 2019	Pan-STARRS	5	✓ CEN	✗ DAM	✗	6.2	0.7	41.3	1.6	10.9	1.93	SSBN07: not a centaur; (U:E)	MPC · JPL
2019 WV_{2}	26 Nov 2019	Pan-STARRS	5	✓ CEN	✗ UMP	✗	6.5	0.5	27.3	3.3	9.8	2.52	SSBN07: not a centaur; (U:2)	MPC · JPL
2020 BF_{12}	25 Jan 2020	Pan-STARRS	9	✓ CEN	✓ CEN	✓ R	10.4	0.3	7	6.8	14	3.13	(U:3)	MPC · JPL
2020 BF_{13}	26 Jan 2020	Pan-STARRS	12	✓ CEN	✗ UMP	✗	7.8	0.5	36	4.3	11.3	2.43	SSBN07: not a centaur; (U:3); MPC: Other UMP	MPC · JPL
2020 BG_{60}	24 Jan 2020	Mauna Kea Obs.	56	✓ CEN	✓ CEN	✓ R	27.9	0.3	21.2	20.2	35.5	4.34	(U:1)	MPC · JPL
2020 BL_{76}	21 Jan 2020	Pan-STARRS	3.9	✓ CEN	✗	✗	5.5	0.3	18.6	4.1	7	2.83	SSBN07: not a centaur; (U:1)	MPC · JPL
2020 BV_{64}	24 Jan 2020	MLS	4	✓ CEN	✗ UMP	✗	12	0.7	10.3	3.8	20.2	2.61	SSBN07: not a centaur; (U:6); MPC: Other UMP	MPC · JPL
2020 BW_{6}	24 Jan 2020	Pan-STARRS	6	✓ CEN	✓ CEN	✓ R	10.7	0.5	3.3	5.4	16	2.97	SSBN07: not a centaur; (U:3)	MPC · JPL
2020 DD_{5}	29 Feb 2020	Bok Telescope	53	✗ TNO	✓ CEN	✓ R	34.5	0.4	3.8	17.9	48.3	4.86	—	MPC · JPL
2020 DN_{2}	19 Feb 2020	ZTF	6	✓ CEN	✗ UMP	✗	6.1	0.5	18.5	3.3	8.9	2.68	SSBN07: not a centaur; (U:1); MPC: Other UMP	MPC · JPL
2020 EP	2 Mar 2020	MLS	4	✓ CEN	✗ DAM	✗	10.5	0.8	76.4	2.5	18.5	0.93	SSBN07: not a centaur; (U:3); MPC: Other UMP	MPC · JPL
2020 FH_{24}	25 Mar 2020	MLS	5	✓ CEN	✗ UMP	✗	15.5	0.8	28.6	3.3	27.8	2.2	SSBN07: not a centaur; (U:2); MPC: Other UMP	MPC · JPL
2020 FP_{7}	21 Mar 2020	Pan-STARRS	36	✗ TNO	✓ CEN	✓ R	52.1	0.8	49.8	7	93.8	2.55	SSBN07: not a centaur	MPC · JPL
2020 HB_{11}	18 Apr 2020	MLS	6	✓ CEN	✗ DAM	✗	16.6	0.7	147.3	4.8	28.4	-1.81	SSBN07: not a centaur; (U:7); MPC: Other UMP	MPC · JPL
2020 HK_{93}	21 Apr 2020	Pan-STARRS	2.8	✓ CEN	✗ UMP	✗	7.3	0.6	17.1	3.2	11.4	2.58	SSBN07: not a centaur; (U:4); MPC: Other UMP	MPC · JPL
2020 JV_{3}	2 May 2020	MLS	4	✓ CEN	✗ UMP	✗	6.4	0.5	8.5	3.3	9.4	2.74	SSBN07: not a centaur; (U:2)	MPC · JPL
2020 KD_{6}	17 May 2020	Pan-STARRS	0.7	✓ CEN	✗ DAM	✗	13.1	0.9	38.7	1.7	24.4	1.61	SSBN07: not a centaur; (U:7); MPC: Other UMP	MPC · JPL
2020 KH_{7}	29 May 2020	Pan-STARRS	6	✓ CEN	✗ DAM	✗	7.9	0.5	106.1	4	11.9	0.06	SSBN07: not a centaur; (U:1); MPC: Other UMP	MPC · JPL
2020 MK4	24 Jun 2020	Pan-STARRS	23	✓ CEN	✗	✓ R	6.2	0	6.8	6.1	6.3	3.01	SSBN07: not a centaur; (U:4)	MPC · JPL
2020 OP_{7}	21 Jul 2020	Pan-STARRS	2.5	✓ CEN	✗ DAM	✗	28.4	0.9	79.5	3	53.8	0.56	SSBN07: not a centaur; (U:2); MPC: Other UMP	MPC · JPL
2020 OP_{8}	17 Jul 2020	Pan-STARRS	8	✓ CEN	✗ UMP	✗	14.1	0.7	30	3.9	24.2	2.35	SSBN07: not a centaur; (U:0); MPC: Other UMP	MPC · JPL
2020 OR_{5}	17 Jul 2020	Pan-STARRS	4	✓ CEN	✗ DAM	✗	6.2	0.4	166.6	3.9	8.6	-1.14	SSBN07: not a centaur; (U:0); MPC: Other UMP	MPC · JPL
2020 OS_{5}	21 Jul 2020	Pan-STARRS	2.0	✓ CEN	✗ DAM	✗	7	0.7	155.8	2.2	11.8	-0.79	SSBN07: not a centaur; (U:2); MPC: Other UMP	MPC · JPL
2020 OS_{86}	18 Jul 2020	Pan-STARRS	5	✓ CEN	✗ UMP	✗	8.2	0.6	7.4	3.2	13.2	2.61	SSBN07: not a centaur; (U:2); MPC: Other UMP	MPC · JPL
2020 PA_{7}	13 Aug 2020	Pan-STARRS	13	✓ CEN	✓ CEN	✓ R	19.6	0.6	9.3	8.6	30.5	3.44	(U:2)	MPC · JPL
2020 PA_{12}	12 Aug 2020	Pan-STARRS	3	✓ CEN	✗ UMP	✗	5.9	0.5	5	2.9	8.9	2.71	SSBN07: not a centaur; (U:0)	MPC · JPL
2020 PE_{75}	12 Aug 2020	Pan-STARRS	7	✓ CEN	✗ UMP	✗	15.6	0.7	1.4	4.9	26.4	2.86	SSBN07: not a centaur; (U:3)	MPC · JPL
2020 PG_{3}	14 Aug 2020	Pan-STARRS	25	✓ CEN	✓ CEN	✓ R	19.6	0.5	19.8	10.5	28.7	3.5	(U:3)	MPC · JPL
2020 PJ_{75}	13 Aug 2020	MLS	7	✓ CEN	✗ UMP	✗	10.3	0.6	10.4	4.5	16.1	2.8	SSBN07: not a centaur; (U:2)	MPC · JPL
2020 PQ_{7}	14 Aug 2020	Pan-STARRS	11	✓ CEN	✓ CEN	✓ R	20.3	0.7	22.4	6.8	33.7	2.99	SSBN07: not a centaur; (U:3)	MPC · JPL
2020 QO_{6}	18 Aug 2020	Pan-STARRS	1.3	✓ CEN	✗ DAM	✗	19.2	0.9	80.5	2.4	35.9	0.58	SSBN07: not a centaur; (U:4)	MPC · JPL
2020 QP_{42}	22 Aug 2020	Pan-STARRS	5	✓ CEN	✗ UMP	✗	7.9	0.5	20.3	4	11.9	2.66	SSBN07: not a centaur; (U:3); MPC: Other UMP	MPC · JPL
2020 RP_{11}	9 Sep 2020	Pan-STARRS	10	✓ CEN	✓ CEN	✓ R	22.8	0.7	30.4	6	39.7	2.66	SSBN07: not a centaur; (U:2)	MPC · JPL
2020 SJ_{5}	19 Sep 2020	Pan-STARRS	2.6	✓ CEN	✗ DAM	✗	18.2	0.9	77.4	2.6	33.8	0.71	SSBN07: not a centaur; (U:2); MPC: Other UMP	MPC · JPL
2020 SL_{19}	16 Sep 2020	Pan-STARRS	4	✓ CEN	✗ UMP	✗	7.5	0.6	21.8	2.8	12.2	2.44	SSBN07: not a centaur; (U:1); MPC: Other UMP	MPC · JPL
2020 SV_{79}	23 Sep 2020	MLS	1.1	✓ CEN	✗ DAM	✗	17.7	0.9	5.7	2	33.5	2	SSBN07: not a centaur; (U:5); MPC: Other UMP	MPC · JPL
2020 SW_{7}	17 Sep 2020	Pan-STARRS	8	✓ CEN	✗ UMP	✗	8.9	0.5	14.7	4.7	13.2	2.81	SSBN07: not a centaur; (U:2); MPC: Other UMP	MPC · JPL
2020 TK_{9}	15 Oct 2020	MLS	2.1	✓ CEN	✗ DAM	✗	20.9	0.9	105.6	2.5	39.3	-0.26	SSBN07: not a centaur; (U:4); MPC: Other UMP	MPC · JPL
2020 TQ_{14}	13 Oct 2020	MLS	1.7	✓ CEN	✗ UMP	✗	6	0.6	26.9	2.3	9.8	2.37	SSBN07: not a centaur; (U:3); MPC: Other UMP	MPC · JPL
2020 TU_{8}	14 Oct 2020	Pan-STARRS	2.0	✓ CEN	✗ DAM	✗	6.5	0.6	46.7	2.3	10.7	1.97	SSBN07: not a centaur; (U:6); MPC: Other UMP	MPC · JPL
2020 VF_{1}	8 Nov 2020	PMO NEO Srvy.	55	✓ CEN	✓ CEN	✓ R	24.5	0.7	53.5	8.4	40.7	2.16	(U:4)	MPC · JPL
2020 VL_{26}	13 Nov 2020	Cerro Tololo Obs.	85	✗ TNO	✓ CEN	✓ R	55.2	0.6	19.6	17.4	88.3	5	—	MPC · JPL
2020 VS_{6}	12 Nov 2020	MLS	0.8	✓ CEN	✗ DAM	✗	9.6	0.8	161.3	1.8	17.5	-0.94	SSBN07: not a centaur; (U:8); MPC: Other UMP	MPC · JPL
2020 WJ_{5}	18 Nov 2020	MLS	16	✓ CEN	n.a.	✗	6	0.2	22.3	5	7	2.83	SSBN07: not a centaur; (U:2)	MPC · JPL
2020 XQ_{7}	12 Dec 2020	Bok Telescope	1.0	✓ CEN	✗ DAM	✗	23.6	0.9	32.5	1.9	45.2	1.65	SSBN07: not a centaur; (U:3)	MPC · JPL
2020 XV_{1}	5 Dec 2020	MLS	5	✓ CEN	✗ UMP	✗	5.9	0.4	7	3.5	8.3	2.82	SSBN07: not a centaur; (U:2)	MPC · JPL
2021 AE_{3}	5 Jan 2021	Pan-STARRS	6	✓ CEN	✗ UMP	✗	8.3	0.4	31.7	4.8	11.9	2.57	SSBN07: not a centaur; (U:); MPC: Other UMP	MPC · JPL
2021 CE_{22}	12 Feb 2021	Pan-STARRS	1.0	✓ CEN	✗ UMP	✗	7.3	0.8	7.2	1.7	12.8	2.22	SSBN07: not a centaur; (U:3); MPC: Other UMP	MPC · JPL
2021 CO_{10}	24 Nov 2011	Mauna Kea Obs.	15	✓ CEN	✓ CEN	✓ R	19.3	0.6	14.2	7.7	30.9	3.26	(U:2)	MPC · JPL
2021 CP_{5}	7 Feb 2021	Pan-STARRS	20	✗ TNO	✓ CEN	✓ S	333.2	0.9	9.2	10.5	633.1	6.9	—	MPC · JPL
2021 CT_{3}	7 Feb 2021	Pan-STARRS	5	✓ CEN	✗ DAM	✗	7.4	0.4	160.3	4.3	10.6	-1.34	SSBN07: not a centaur; (U:6); MPC: Other UMP	MPC · JPL
2021 DN_{2}	17 Feb 2021	Pan-STARRS	5	✓ CEN	✗ UMP	✗	22.1	0.8	10.8	4	40.2	2.55	SSBN07: not a centaur; (U:4); MPC: Other UMP	MPC · JPL
2021 DQ_{15}	16 Feb 2021	Mauna Kea Obs.	307	✗ TNO	✓ CEN	✗	79.4	0.6	3	27.8	127	6.31	—	MPC · JPL
2021 FN_{31}	20 Mar 2021	MLS	5	✓ CEN	✗ UMP	✗	8.3	0.6	11.2	3.5	13	2.64	SSBN07: not a centaur; (U:6)	MPC · JPL
2021 FQ_{2}	18 Mar 2021	MLS	4	✓ CEN	✗ DAM	✗	10.8	0.8	54.9	2.2	19.4	1.49	SSBN07: not a centaur; (U:1)	MPC · JPL
2021 GT_{72}	7 Apr 2021	Pan-STARRS	4	✓ CEN	✗ UMP	✗	5.6	0.5	9.2	3	8.2	2.74	SSBN07: not a centaur; (U:3)	MPC · JPL
2021 JG_{47}	4 May 2021	Pan-STARRS	2.6	✓ CEN	✗ UMP	✗	5.9	0.7	14.8	2	9.8	2.43	SSBN07: not a centaur; (U:5)	MPC · JPL
2021 JK_{10}	10 May 2021	Pan-STARRS	37	✓ CEN	✓ CEN	✓ R	18.2	0.3	17.4	13.4	23.1	3.73	(U:2)	MPC · JPL
2021 JN_{58}	8 May 2021	Pan-STARRS	2.7	✓ CEN	n.a.	✗	5.9	0.4	22.4	3.7	8.1	2.71	SSBN07: not a centaur; (U:2)	MPC · JPL
2021 LB_{18}	7 Jun 2021	Pan-STARRS	2.3	✓ CEN	✗ DAM	✗	28.5	0.9	129	3.4	53.6	-1.21	SSBN07: not a centaur; (U:9)	MPC · JPL
2021 NX_{7}	4 Jul 2021	ATLAS-MLO	18	✓ CEN	✗ DAM	✗	8.5	0.6	63.8	3.5	13.5	1.52	SSBN07: not a centaur; (U:4)	MPC · JPL
2021 OK_{11}	31 Jul 2021	PMO NEO	8	✓ CEN	✗ UMP	✗	7.2	0.4	8.2	4	10.4	2.8	SSBN07: not a centaur; (U:3)	MPC · JPL
2021 PD	1 Aug 2021	Pan-STARRS	3	✓ CEN	✗ DAM	✗	6.3	0.6	71.4	2.4	10.2	1.38	SSBN07: not a centaur; (U:2)	MPC · JPL
2021 RK_{133}	7 Sep 2021	Pan-STARRS	3	✓ CEN	✗ UMP	✗	9.4	0.7	15.7	3.1	15.6	2.48	SSBN07: not a centaur; (U:4)	MPC · JPL
2021 RZ_{47}	9 Sep 2021	MLS	3	✓ CEN	✗ UMP	✗	5.6	0.4	4.6	3.4	7.7	2.83	SSBN07: not a centaur; (U:4)	MPC · JPL
2021 RZ_{145}	8 Sep 2021	Pan-STARRS	1.6	✓ CEN	✗ UMP	✗	6.3	0.7	17.6	2.1	10.5	2.4	SSBN07: not a centaur; (U:3)	MPC · JPL
2021 SN_{11}	28 Sep 2021	Pan-STARRS	7	✓ CEN	✓ CEN	✓ R	8.5	0.4	17.6	5.4	11.7	2.88	SSBN07: not a centaur; (U:4)	MPC · JPL
2021 TP_{15}	14 Oct 2021	MLS	9	✓ CEN	✓ CEN	✓ R	13.4	0.6	22	5.4	21.4	2.77	SSBN07: not a centaur; (U:3)	MPC · JPL
2021 TR_{81}	8 Oct 2021	MLS	2.1	✓ CEN	✗ DAM	✗	8.8	0.8	36.8	1.5	16.1	1.74	SSBN07: not a centaur; (U:4)	MPC · JPL
2021 UH_{5}	28 Oct 2021	Pan-STARRS	0.5	✓ CEN	✗ UMP	✗	5.5	0.7	9.4	1.8	9.3	2.44	SSBN07: not a centaur; (U:6)	MPC · JPL
2021 UY_{27}	31 Oct 2021	Pan-STARRS	2.6	✓ CEN	✗ UMP	✗	10.5	0.7	16.5	2.8	18.2	2.34	SSBN07: not a centaur; (U:7)	MPC · JPL
2021 VA_{28}	11 Nov 2021	Pan-STARRS	3.0	✓ CEN	n.a.	✗	5.7	0.2	32.5	4.8	6.7	2.65	SSBN07: not a centaur; (U:3)	MPC · JPL
2021 VK_{27}	11 Nov 2021	Pan-STARRS	9	✓ CEN	✓ CEN	✓ R	12.8	0.5	17.1	6.6	19.1	3.03	SSBN07: not a centaur; (U:4)	MPC · JPL
2021 VQ_{8}	6 Nov 2021	Pan-STARRS	0.7	✓ CEN	✗ UMP	✗	9.3	0.8	23.3	2	16.7	2.07	SSBN07: not a centaur; (U:4)	MPC · JPL
2021 VU_{11}	7 Nov 2021	Pan-STARRS	1.9	✓ CEN	✓ CEN	✗	14.1	0.8	11.9	3.3	25	2.44	SSBN07: not a centaur; (U:2)	MPC · JPL
2021 WT_{6}	29 Nov 2021	CSS	5	✓ CEN	✗ DAM	✗	5.8	0.7	135.1	1.7	9.8	-0.16	SSBN07: not a centaur; (U:5)	MPC · JPL
2021 XZ_{3}	2 Dec 2021	MLS	6	✓ CEN	✗ DAM	✗	14.2	0.8	172.1	3.1	25.3	-1.68	SSBN07: not a centaur; (U:5)	MPC · JPL
2021 YP	21 Dec 2021	MLS	1.3	✓ CEN	n.a.	✗	6.1	0.7	170.2	1.9	10.4	-0.71	SSBN07: not a centaur; (U:6)	MPC · JPL
2022 AA_{7}	7 Jan 2022	Pan-STARRS	1.1	✓ CEN	n.a.	✗	11.5	0.8	122.4	2.3	20.7	-0.5	SSBN07: not a centaur; (U:9)	MPC · JPL
2022 AC_{8}	8 Jan 2022	Pan-STARRS	1.4	✓ CEN	n.a.	✗	13.6	0.8	153.2	2.6	24.5	-1.32	SSBN07: not a centaur; (U:6)	MPC · JPL
2022 BB_{25}	25 Jan 2022	MLS	2.1	✓ CEN	n.a.	✗	5.7	0.4	5.8	3.3	8.2	2.8	SSBN07: not a centaur; (U:4)	MPC · JPL
2022 BG_{8}	29 Jan 2022	Pan-STARRS	4.8	✓ CEN	n.a.	✗	7.1	0.3	25.5	4.9	9.3	2.74	SSBN07: not a centaur; (U:2)	MPC · JPL
2022 CT_{7}	2 Feb 2022	Pan-STARRS	1.6	✓ CEN	n.a.	✗	10.5	0.8	79.3	2.3	18.8	0.82	SSBN07: not a centaur; (U:5)	MPC · JPL
2022 EP_{5}	1 Mar 2022	MLS	4.2	✓ CEN	n.a.	✗	14.6	0.7	8.8	4.5	24.8	2.74	SSBN07: not a centaur; (U:5)	MPC · JPL

back to top

== See also ==
- List of trans-Neptunian objects
- List of damocloids
- Unusual minor planet
