= List of minor planets: 762001–763000 =

The following is a partial list of minor planets, running from minor-planet number 762001 through 763000, inclusive. The primary data for this and other partial lists is based on JPL's "Small-Body Orbital Elements" and data available from the Minor Planet Center. Critical list information is also provided by the MPC, unless otherwise specified from Lowell Observatory. A detailed description of the table's columns and additional sources are given on the main page including a complete list of every page in this series, and a statistical break-up on the dynamical classification of minor planets.

Also see the summary list of all named bodies in numerical and alphabetical order, and the corresponding naming citations for the number range of this particular list. New namings may only be added to this list after official publication, as the preannouncement of names is condemned by the Working Group for Small Bodies Nomenclature of the International Astronomical Union.

Near-Earth obj.	MBA (inner)	MBA (outer)	Centaur
Mars-crosser	MBA (middle)	Jupiter trojan	Trans-Neptunian obj.
Unclassified

== 762001–762100 ==
Designation			Discovery			Properties		Ref
Permanent	Provisional	Named after	Date	Site	Discoverer(s)	Category	Diam.	Ref
762001	2010 UP_{115}	—	October 17, 2010	Mount Lemmon	Mount Lemmon Survey	NEM	1.5 km	MPC · JPL
762002	2010 UA_{116}	—	October 30, 2010	Mount Lemmon	Mount Lemmon Survey	·	1.6 km	MPC · JPL
762003	2010 UW_{119}	—	August 28, 2014	Haleakala	Pan-STARRS 1	·	1.2 km	MPC · JPL
762004	2010 UL_{120}	—	October 19, 2010	Mount Lemmon	Mount Lemmon Survey	·	1.3 km	MPC · JPL
762005	2010 UJ_{122}	—	October 31, 2010	Kitt Peak	Spacewatch	·	540 m	MPC · JPL
762006	2010 UF_{124}	—	October 17, 2010	Mount Lemmon	Mount Lemmon Survey	·	470 m	MPC · JPL
762007	2010 UD_{126}	—	October 30, 2010	Mount Lemmon	Mount Lemmon Survey	L4	8.1 km	MPC · JPL
762008	2010 UA_{132}	—	October 28, 2010	Mount Lemmon	Mount Lemmon Survey	L4	7.1 km	MPC · JPL
762009	2010 VK_{3}	—	November 1, 2010	Mount Lemmon	Mount Lemmon Survey	·	1.4 km	MPC · JPL
762010	2010 VP_{3}	—	November 1, 2010	Mount Lemmon	Mount Lemmon Survey	·	570 m	MPC · JPL
762011	2010 VE_{4}	—	October 2, 2010	Mount Lemmon	Mount Lemmon Survey	·	1.7 km	MPC · JPL
762012	2010 VH_{6}	—	November 1, 2010	Mount Lemmon	Mount Lemmon Survey	·	1.5 km	MPC · JPL
762013	2010 VW_{7}	—	November 1, 2010	Mount Lemmon	Mount Lemmon Survey	·	2.3 km	MPC · JPL
762014	2010 VO_{23}	—	October 12, 2010	Mount Lemmon	Mount Lemmon Survey	·	620 m	MPC · JPL
762015	2010 VC_{45}	—	November 1, 2010	Mount Lemmon	Mount Lemmon Survey	·	1.2 km	MPC · JPL
762016	2010 VR_{45}	—	November 1, 2010	Piszkés-tető	K. Sárneczky, Z. Kuli	GAL	1.2 km	MPC · JPL
762017	2010 VZ_{51}	—	September 26, 2005	Kitt Peak	Spacewatch	·	1.2 km	MPC · JPL
762018	2010 VG_{52}	—	November 3, 2010	Mount Lemmon	Mount Lemmon Survey	·	1.4 km	MPC · JPL
762019	2010 VS_{52}	—	June 2, 2013	Mount Lemmon	Mount Lemmon Survey	·	1.0 km	MPC · JPL
762020	2010 VA_{53}	—	November 3, 2010	Mount Lemmon	Mount Lemmon Survey	L4 · HEK	6.2 km	MPC · JPL
762021	2010 VS_{56}	—	November 3, 2010	Mount Lemmon	Mount Lemmon Survey	L4	7.1 km	MPC · JPL
762022	2010 VZ_{56}	—	November 3, 2010	Mount Lemmon	Mount Lemmon Survey	L4	6.0 km	MPC · JPL
762023	2010 VN_{60}	—	November 4, 2010	Mount Lemmon	Mount Lemmon Survey	·	540 m	MPC · JPL
762024	2010 VV_{64}	—	October 12, 2010	Mount Lemmon	Mount Lemmon Survey	·	530 m	MPC · JPL
762025	2010 VB_{66}	—	November 1, 2010	Mount Lemmon	Mount Lemmon Survey	L4	5.7 km	MPC · JPL
762026	2010 VD_{66}	—	November 1, 2010	Mount Lemmon	Mount Lemmon Survey	·	830 m	MPC · JPL
762027	2010 VP_{70}	—	October 9, 2010	Kitt Peak	Spacewatch	·	1.2 km	MPC · JPL
762028	2010 VF_{80}	—	November 3, 2010	Mount Lemmon	Mount Lemmon Survey	·	2.1 km	MPC · JPL
762029	2010 VV_{85}	—	November 12, 2005	Kitt Peak	Spacewatch	·	1.5 km	MPC · JPL
762030	2010 VV_{92}	—	October 31, 2010	Mount Lemmon	Mount Lemmon Survey	·	1.2 km	MPC · JPL
762031	2010 VO_{94}	—	November 7, 2010	Mount Lemmon	Mount Lemmon Survey	·	1.9 km	MPC · JPL
762032	2010 VE_{96}	—	November 8, 2010	Mount Lemmon	Mount Lemmon Survey	(2076)	490 m	MPC · JPL
762033	2010 VA_{101}	—	November 5, 2010	Kitt Peak	Spacewatch	·	590 m	MPC · JPL
762034	2010 VC_{102}	—	September 12, 2005	Kitt Peak	Spacewatch	·	1.3 km	MPC · JPL
762035	2010 VT_{105}	—	September 11, 2010	Mount Lemmon	Mount Lemmon Survey	·	1.4 km	MPC · JPL
762036	2010 VQ_{106}	—	November 5, 2010	Mount Lemmon	Mount Lemmon Survey	·	1.7 km	MPC · JPL
762037	2010 VE_{120}	—	November 8, 2010	Kitt Peak	Spacewatch	·	550 m	MPC · JPL
762038	2010 VL_{123}	—	October 29, 2010	Mount Lemmon	Mount Lemmon Survey	·	1.2 km	MPC · JPL
762039	2010 VS_{123}	—	October 29, 2010	Mount Lemmon	Mount Lemmon Survey	·	1.7 km	MPC · JPL
762040	2010 VU_{129}	—	October 17, 2010	Mount Lemmon	Mount Lemmon Survey	·	1.6 km	MPC · JPL
762041	2010 VF_{136}	—	November 10, 2010	Kitt Peak	Spacewatch	L4	5.6 km	MPC · JPL
762042	2010 VO_{141}	—	October 17, 2010	Mount Lemmon	Mount Lemmon Survey	AGN	920 m	MPC · JPL
762043	2010 VP_{142}	—	November 6, 2010	Mount Lemmon	Mount Lemmon Survey	L4 · ERY	5.5 km	MPC · JPL
762044	2010 VQ_{145}	—	November 6, 2010	Mount Lemmon	Mount Lemmon Survey	V	450 m	MPC · JPL
762045	2010 VY_{149}	—	November 6, 2010	Mount Lemmon	Mount Lemmon Survey	·	1.5 km	MPC · JPL
762046	2010 VE_{150}	—	November 6, 2010	Mount Lemmon	Mount Lemmon Survey	·	1.9 km	MPC · JPL
762047	2010 VY_{150}	—	November 6, 2010	Mount Lemmon	Mount Lemmon Survey	L4	6.5 km	MPC · JPL
762048	2010 VR_{156}	—	September 30, 2003	Kitt Peak	Spacewatch	·	490 m	MPC · JPL
762049	2010 VL_{158}	—	November 8, 2010	Mauna Kea	Forshay, P., M. Micheli	HOF	1.9 km	MPC · JPL
762050	2010 VH_{161}	—	October 29, 2010	Kitt Peak	Spacewatch	L4	7.7 km	MPC · JPL
762051	2010 VL_{161}	—	November 10, 2010	Kitt Peak	Spacewatch	·	1.4 km	MPC · JPL
762052	2010 VV_{163}	—	November 10, 2010	Kitt Peak	Spacewatch	·	650 m	MPC · JPL
762053	2010 VM_{168}	—	November 10, 2010	Kitt Peak	Spacewatch	L4	8.2 km	MPC · JPL
762054	2010 VN_{178}	—	November 11, 2010	Mount Lemmon	Mount Lemmon Survey	·	600 m	MPC · JPL
762055	2010 VJ_{186}	—	October 30, 2010	Mount Lemmon	Mount Lemmon Survey	·	2.8 km	MPC · JPL
762056	2010 VQ_{186}	—	October 9, 2010	Mount Lemmon	Mount Lemmon Survey	·	1.4 km	MPC · JPL
762057	2010 VT_{186}	—	October 9, 2010	Mount Lemmon	Mount Lemmon Survey	·	1.5 km	MPC · JPL
762058	2010 VJ_{187}	—	November 13, 2010	Mount Lemmon	Mount Lemmon Survey	L4	6.2 km	MPC · JPL
762059	2010 VT_{187}	—	November 13, 2010	Mount Lemmon	Mount Lemmon Survey	·	1.8 km	MPC · JPL
762060	2010 VY_{189}	—	October 14, 2010	Mount Lemmon	Mount Lemmon Survey	ARM	3.0 km	MPC · JPL
762061	2010 VA_{190}	—	November 1, 2010	Kitt Peak	Spacewatch	·	1.5 km	MPC · JPL
762062	2010 VJ_{190}	—	November 13, 2010	Mount Lemmon	Mount Lemmon Survey	KOR	1.2 km	MPC · JPL
762063	2010 VW_{191}	—	November 11, 2010	Kitt Peak	Spacewatch	NYS	1 km	MPC · JPL
762064	2010 VN_{215}	—	November 2, 2010	Palomar	Palomar Transient Factory	·	1.3 km	MPC · JPL
762065	2010 VU_{226}	—	November 2, 2010	Mount Lemmon	Mount Lemmon Survey	·	1.5 km	MPC · JPL
762066	2010 VC_{227}	—	November 16, 2006	Kitt Peak	Spacewatch	EUN	770 m	MPC · JPL
762067	2010 VN_{227}	—	November 10, 2010	Mount Lemmon	Mount Lemmon Survey	·	1.2 km	MPC · JPL
762068	2010 VX_{227}	—	November 14, 2010	Kitt Peak	Spacewatch	GEF	720 m	MPC · JPL
762069	2010 VF_{232}	—	January 19, 2012	Haleakala	Pan-STARRS 1	TIR	2.0 km	MPC · JPL
762070	2010 VQ_{232}	—	February 18, 2015	Haleakala	Pan-STARRS 1	·	530 m	MPC · JPL
762071	2010 VV_{232}	—	November 3, 2014	Mount Lemmon	Mount Lemmon Survey	PHO	940 m	MPC · JPL
762072	2010 VW_{232}	—	November 6, 2010	Mount Lemmon	Mount Lemmon Survey	·	600 m	MPC · JPL
762073	2010 VO_{234}	—	November 2, 2010	Mount Lemmon	Mount Lemmon Survey	·	1.2 km	MPC · JPL
762074	2010 VX_{234}	—	November 10, 2010	Mount Lemmon	Mount Lemmon Survey	·	570 m	MPC · JPL
762075	2010 VR_{235}	—	April 17, 2013	Haleakala	Pan-STARRS 1	·	1.5 km	MPC · JPL
762076	2010 VT_{235}	—	November 11, 2010	Mount Lemmon	Mount Lemmon Survey	DOR	1.7 km	MPC · JPL
762077	2010 VY_{235}	—	November 5, 2010	Mount Lemmon	Mount Lemmon Survey	TIR	2.3 km	MPC · JPL
762078	2010 VB_{236}	—	December 31, 2015	Haleakala	Pan-STARRS 1	EUN	910 m	MPC · JPL
762079	2010 VL_{236}	—	November 8, 2010	Mount Lemmon	Mount Lemmon Survey	·	1.6 km	MPC · JPL
762080	2010 VV_{238}	—	August 20, 2014	Haleakala	Pan-STARRS 1	·	1.5 km	MPC · JPL
762081	2010 VX_{238}	—	May 31, 2014	Haleakala	Pan-STARRS 1	GAL	1.5 km	MPC · JPL
762082	2010 VJ_{239}	—	January 10, 2016	Haleakala	Pan-STARRS 1	·	1.6 km	MPC · JPL
762083	2010 VQ_{239}	—	November 11, 2010	Mount Lemmon	Mount Lemmon Survey	HOF	1.9 km	MPC · JPL
762084	2010 VE_{240}	—	February 24, 2017	Haleakala	Pan-STARRS 1	DOR	1.8 km	MPC · JPL
762085	2010 VO_{240}	—	June 6, 2018	Haleakala	Pan-STARRS 1	·	1.8 km	MPC · JPL
762086	2010 VQ_{240}	—	June 29, 2014	Haleakala	Pan-STARRS 1	·	1.6 km	MPC · JPL
762087	2010 VB_{241}	—	November 10, 2010	Mount Lemmon	Mount Lemmon Survey	·	1.4 km	MPC · JPL
762088	2010 VC_{241}	—	August 23, 2014	Haleakala	Pan-STARRS 1	·	1.5 km	MPC · JPL
762089	2010 VD_{241}	—	October 30, 2017	Haleakala	Pan-STARRS 1	·	590 m	MPC · JPL
762090	2010 VH_{241}	—	November 1, 2010	Kitt Peak	Spacewatch	TIN	860 m	MPC · JPL
762091	2010 VE_{242}	—	November 12, 2010	Mount Lemmon	Mount Lemmon Survey	·	570 m	MPC · JPL
762092	2010 VC_{243}	—	September 1, 2013	Mount Lemmon	Mount Lemmon Survey	·	570 m	MPC · JPL
762093	2010 VY_{243}	—	December 23, 2016	Haleakala	Pan-STARRS 1	·	1.5 km	MPC · JPL
762094	2010 VM_{244}	—	November 2, 2010	Mount Lemmon	Mount Lemmon Survey	·	2.5 km	MPC · JPL
762095	2010 VY_{244}	—	November 12, 2010	Mount Lemmon	Mount Lemmon Survey	L4	6.8 km	MPC · JPL
762096	2010 VK_{246}	—	November 10, 2010	Mount Lemmon	Mount Lemmon Survey	·	1.2 km	MPC · JPL
762097	2010 VL_{246}	—	February 4, 2017	Haleakala	Pan-STARRS 1	·	1.6 km	MPC · JPL
762098	2010 VV_{247}	—	November 6, 2010	Westfield	International Astronomical Search Collaboration	·	1.4 km	MPC · JPL
762099	2010 VD_{248}	—	December 9, 2015	Haleakala	Pan-STARRS 1	·	1.4 km	MPC · JPL
762100	2010 VK_{248}	—	August 31, 2014	Haleakala	Pan-STARRS 1	·	1.2 km	MPC · JPL

== 762101–762200 ==
back to top

Designation			Discovery			Properties		Ref
Permanent	Provisional	Named after	Date	Site	Discoverer(s)	Category	Diam.	Ref
762101	2010 VO_{248}	—	January 4, 2016	Haleakala	Pan-STARRS 1	·	1.5 km	MPC · JPL
762102	2010 VQ_{248}	—	November 2, 2010	Kitt Peak	Spacewatch	L4	7.7 km	MPC · JPL
762103	2010 VB_{249}	—	November 10, 2010	Mount Lemmon	Mount Lemmon Survey	L4	6.5 km	MPC · JPL
762104	2010 VV_{249}	—	November 14, 2010	Kitt Peak	Spacewatch	L4	8.0 km	MPC · JPL
762105	2010 VB_{250}	—	November 2, 2010	Mount Lemmon	Mount Lemmon Survey	·	1.6 km	MPC · JPL
762106	2010 VC_{250}	—	November 14, 2010	Mount Lemmon	Mount Lemmon Survey	·	1.5 km	MPC · JPL
762107	2010 VX_{250}	—	November 3, 2010	Mount Lemmon	Mount Lemmon Survey	·	1.5 km	MPC · JPL
762108	2010 VG_{254}	—	November 8, 2010	Mount Lemmon	Mount Lemmon Survey	·	2.3 km	MPC · JPL
762109	2010 VT_{254}	—	November 10, 2010	Mount Lemmon	Mount Lemmon Survey	·	680 m	MPC · JPL
762110	2010 VS_{255}	—	November 3, 2010	Mount Lemmon	Mount Lemmon Survey	L4	5.8 km	MPC · JPL
762111	2010 VH_{256}	—	November 8, 2010	Mount Lemmon	Mount Lemmon Survey	·	530 m	MPC · JPL
762112	2010 VZ_{256}	—	November 12, 2010	Mount Lemmon	Mount Lemmon Survey	L4	5.6 km	MPC · JPL
762113	2010 VG_{260}	—	November 8, 2010	Mount Lemmon	Mount Lemmon Survey	L4	6.3 km	MPC · JPL
762114	2010 VV_{261}	—	November 10, 2010	Kitt Peak	Spacewatch	·	520 m	MPC · JPL
762115	2010 VT_{262}	—	November 7, 2010	Mount Lemmon	Mount Lemmon Survey	L4	7.4 km	MPC · JPL
762116	2010 VF_{263}	—	November 3, 2010	Mount Lemmon	Mount Lemmon Survey	L4	6.8 km	MPC · JPL
762117	2010 VR_{265}	—	November 2, 2010	Mount Lemmon	Mount Lemmon Survey	·	1.4 km	MPC · JPL
762118	2010 VS_{266}	—	November 13, 2010	Mount Lemmon	Mount Lemmon Survey	·	1.1 km	MPC · JPL
762119	2010 VW_{266}	—	November 14, 2010	Kitt Peak	Spacewatch	·	1.3 km	MPC · JPL
762120	2010 VT_{267}	—	November 8, 2010	Mount Lemmon	Mount Lemmon Survey	L4	6.3 km	MPC · JPL
762121	2010 VV_{267}	—	November 14, 2010	Kitt Peak	Spacewatch	·	1.3 km	MPC · JPL
762122	2010 VV_{269}	—	November 2, 2010	Mount Lemmon	Mount Lemmon Survey	·	1.2 km	MPC · JPL
762123	2010 VL_{270}	—	November 3, 2010	Mount Lemmon	Mount Lemmon Survey	L4	5.9 km	MPC · JPL
762124	2010 VO_{270}	—	November 8, 2010	Mount Lemmon	Mount Lemmon Survey	L4	6.8 km	MPC · JPL
762125	2010 VW_{272}	—	November 1, 2010	Mount Lemmon	Mount Lemmon Survey	L4	5.9 km	MPC · JPL
762126	2010 VT_{273}	—	November 7, 2010	Mount Lemmon	Mount Lemmon Survey	L4	6.7 km	MPC · JPL
762127	2010 VV_{273}	—	November 12, 2010	Kitt Peak	Spacewatch	L4	8.0 km	MPC · JPL
762128	2010 VS_{274}	—	November 14, 2010	Kitt Peak	Spacewatch	L4	6.7 km	MPC · JPL
762129	2010 VH_{275}	—	November 12, 2010	Mount Lemmon	Mount Lemmon Survey	L4 · ERY	6.2 km	MPC · JPL
762130	2010 VZ_{284}	—	November 3, 2010	Mount Lemmon	Mount Lemmon Survey	L4	6.0 km	MPC · JPL
762131	2010 WO	—	November 25, 2010	Mount Lemmon	Mount Lemmon Survey	·	1.6 km	MPC · JPL
762132	2010 WU	—	October 17, 2010	Mount Lemmon	Mount Lemmon Survey	·	1.3 km	MPC · JPL
762133	2010 WZ_{6}	—	November 27, 2010	Mount Lemmon	Mount Lemmon Survey	·	460 m	MPC · JPL
762134	2010 WL_{8}	—	October 31, 2010	Kitt Peak	Spacewatch	·	1.4 km	MPC · JPL
762135	2010 WG_{9}	—	November 30, 2010	La Silla	La Silla	T_{j} (1.75) · centaur · slow	113 km	MPC · JPL
762136	2010 WQ_{14}	—	September 18, 2010	Mount Lemmon	Mount Lemmon Survey	L4	7.1 km	MPC · JPL
762137	2010 WR_{14}	—	November 11, 2010	Kitt Peak	Spacewatch	L4 · 006	7.8 km	MPC · JPL
762138	2010 WD_{17}	—	November 2, 2010	Kitt Peak	Spacewatch	L4	8.7 km	MPC · JPL
762139	2010 WT_{18}	—	November 27, 2010	Mount Lemmon	Mount Lemmon Survey	NEM	1.7 km	MPC · JPL
762140	2010 WD_{19}	—	November 12, 2010	Kitt Peak	Spacewatch	·	1.3 km	MPC · JPL
762141	2010 WF_{20}	—	October 30, 2005	Kitt Peak	Spacewatch	·	1.3 km	MPC · JPL
762142	2010 WB_{22}	—	November 13, 2010	Kitt Peak	Spacewatch	·	990 m	MPC · JPL
762143	2010 WJ_{23}	—	November 13, 2010	Kitt Peak	Spacewatch	L4	6.8 km	MPC · JPL
762144	2010 WU_{25}	—	November 27, 2010	Mount Lemmon	Mount Lemmon Survey	L4	7.7 km	MPC · JPL
762145	2010 WS_{27}	—	November 27, 2010	Mount Lemmon	Mount Lemmon Survey	·	1.4 km	MPC · JPL
762146	2010 WA_{28}	—	September 27, 2009	Kitt Peak	Spacewatch	L4	5.9 km	MPC · JPL
762147	2010 WJ_{38}	—	November 27, 2010	Mount Lemmon	Mount Lemmon Survey	V	420 m	MPC · JPL
762148	2010 WX_{38}	—	November 27, 2010	Mount Lemmon	Mount Lemmon Survey	·	1.3 km	MPC · JPL
762149	2010 WU_{40}	—	October 30, 2010	Kitt Peak	Spacewatch	L4	7.5 km	MPC · JPL
762150	2010 WO_{44}	—	February 14, 2007	Mauna Kea	P. A. Wiegert	·	1.4 km	MPC · JPL
762151	2010 WB_{45}	—	September 27, 2009	Kitt Peak	Spacewatch	L4	5.7 km	MPC · JPL
762152	2010 WU_{47}	—	November 25, 2005	Kitt Peak	Spacewatch	·	1.6 km	MPC · JPL
762153	2010 WK_{48}	—	October 29, 2010	Kitt Peak	Spacewatch	L4	7.4 km	MPC · JPL
762154	2010 WD_{51}	—	November 28, 2010	Mount Lemmon	Mount Lemmon Survey	KOR	960 m	MPC · JPL
762155	2010 WH_{51}	—	October 14, 2010	Mount Lemmon	Mount Lemmon Survey	·	1.3 km	MPC · JPL
762156	2010 WH_{53}	—	November 28, 2010	Mount Lemmon	Mount Lemmon Survey	·	1.3 km	MPC · JPL
762157	2010 WM_{53}	—	November 28, 2010	Mount Lemmon	Mount Lemmon Survey	·	1.4 km	MPC · JPL
762158	2010 WB_{67}	—	November 6, 2010	Kitt Peak	Spacewatch	L4	7.5 km	MPC · JPL
762159	2010 WJ_{68}	—	November 15, 2003	Kitt Peak	Spacewatch	·	540 m	MPC · JPL
762160	2010 WB_{75}	—	November 10, 2010	Mount Lemmon	Mount Lemmon Survey	L4 · ERY	6.4 km	MPC · JPL
762161	2010 WP_{75}	—	May 1, 2012	Mount Lemmon	Mount Lemmon Survey	·	580 m	MPC · JPL
762162	2010 WB_{76}	—	April 30, 2016	Haleakala	Pan-STARRS 1	·	620 m	MPC · JPL
762163	2010 WG_{76}	—	November 16, 2010	Mount Lemmon	Mount Lemmon Survey	·	2.0 km	MPC · JPL
762164	2010 WS_{76}	—	November 25, 2010	Mount Lemmon	Mount Lemmon Survey	·	1.4 km	MPC · JPL
762165	2010 WV_{76}	—	November 27, 2010	Mount Lemmon	Mount Lemmon Survey	·	1.4 km	MPC · JPL
762166	2010 WD_{77}	—	August 27, 2014	Haleakala	Pan-STARRS 1	AGN	980 m	MPC · JPL
762167	2010 WE_{77}	—	August 31, 2014	Haleakala	Pan-STARRS 1	·	1.7 km	MPC · JPL
762168	2010 WN_{77}	—	January 17, 2015	Haleakala	Pan-STARRS 1	·	710 m	MPC · JPL
762169	2010 WT_{77}	—	April 26, 2017	Haleakala	Pan-STARRS 1	·	1.4 km	MPC · JPL
762170	2010 WX_{77}	—	November 25, 2010	Mount Lemmon	Mount Lemmon Survey	·	1.3 km	MPC · JPL
762171	2010 WY_{77}	—	September 20, 2014	Haleakala	Pan-STARRS 1	·	1.4 km	MPC · JPL
762172	2010 WZ_{77}	—	November 27, 2010	Mount Lemmon	Mount Lemmon Survey	·	1.4 km	MPC · JPL
762173	2010 WW_{78}	—	November 28, 2010	Mount Lemmon	Mount Lemmon Survey	L4	6.3 km	MPC · JPL
762174	2010 WN_{79}	—	November 30, 2010	Mount Lemmon	Mount Lemmon Survey	BRA	1.3 km	MPC · JPL
762175	2010 WO_{79}	—	November 30, 2010	Mount Lemmon	Mount Lemmon Survey	·	1.3 km	MPC · JPL
762176	2010 XR_{13}	—	December 3, 2010	Mount Lemmon	Mount Lemmon Survey	H	450 m	MPC · JPL
762177	2010 XL_{15}	—	December 2, 2010	Kitt Peak	Spacewatch	·	550 m	MPC · JPL
762178	2010 XT_{15}	—	December 2, 2010	Mount Lemmon	Mount Lemmon Survey	KOR	1.1 km	MPC · JPL
762179	2010 XT_{37}	—	December 3, 2010	Kitt Peak	Spacewatch	·	760 m	MPC · JPL
762180	2010 XA_{40}	—	November 8, 2010	Mount Lemmon	Mount Lemmon Survey	·	1.3 km	MPC · JPL
762181	2010 XV_{70}	—	September 19, 2006	Kitt Peak	Spacewatch	V	470 m	MPC · JPL
762182	2010 XU_{75}	—	December 3, 2010	Kitt Peak	Spacewatch	·	640 m	MPC · JPL
762183	2010 XJ_{80}	—	December 6, 2010	Mount Lemmon	Mount Lemmon Survey	DOR	1.5 km	MPC · JPL
762184	2010 XC_{91}	—	August 19, 2014	Haleakala	Pan-STARRS 1	AGN	940 m	MPC · JPL
762185	2010 XG_{93}	—	December 14, 2010	Mount Lemmon	Mount Lemmon Survey	·	520 m	MPC · JPL
762186	2010 XC_{96}	—	March 16, 2012	Haleakala	Pan-STARRS 1	·	640 m	MPC · JPL
762187	2010 XH_{96}	—	December 4, 2010	Mount Lemmon	Mount Lemmon Survey	·	730 m	MPC · JPL
762188	2010 XA_{97}	—	May 12, 2012	Mount Lemmon	Mount Lemmon Survey	·	570 m	MPC · JPL
762189	2010 XR_{97}	—	November 21, 2015	Mount Lemmon	Mount Lemmon Survey	·	2.3 km	MPC · JPL
762190	2010 XV_{97}	—	January 26, 2015	Haleakala	Pan-STARRS 1	·	630 m	MPC · JPL
762191	2010 XZ_{97}	—	December 8, 2010	Mount Lemmon	Mount Lemmon Survey	·	570 m	MPC · JPL
762192	2010 XA_{99}	—	October 30, 2014	Haleakala	Pan-STARRS 1	·	1.9 km	MPC · JPL
762193	2010 XQ_{100}	—	September 14, 2014	Mount Lemmon	Mount Lemmon Survey	·	1.5 km	MPC · JPL
762194	2010 XD_{101}	—	December 13, 2010	Mount Lemmon	Mount Lemmon Survey	·	600 m	MPC · JPL
762195	2010 XY_{101}	—	December 2, 2010	Kitt Peak	Spacewatch	·	1.8 km	MPC · JPL
762196	2010 XZ_{101}	—	December 10, 2010	Mount Lemmon	Mount Lemmon Survey	NAE	1.7 km	MPC · JPL
762197	2010 XN_{102}	—	August 28, 2014	Haleakala	Pan-STARRS 1	·	1.7 km	MPC · JPL
762198	2010 XN_{103}	—	June 30, 2014	Kitt Peak	Spacewatch	·	1.3 km	MPC · JPL
762199	2010 XU_{103}	—	August 20, 2014	Haleakala	Pan-STARRS 1	·	1.4 km	MPC · JPL
762200	2010 XN_{105}	—	December 14, 2010	Mount Lemmon	Mount Lemmon Survey	·	790 m	MPC · JPL

== 762201–762300 ==
back to top

Designation			Discovery			Properties		Ref
Permanent	Provisional	Named after	Date	Site	Discoverer(s)	Category	Diam.	Ref
762201	2010 XD_{106}	—	December 2, 2010	Kitt Peak	Spacewatch	L4	6.0 km	MPC · JPL
762202	2010 XC_{107}	—	August 27, 2014	Haleakala	Pan-STARRS 1	WIT	700 m	MPC · JPL
762203	2010 XG_{108}	—	February 14, 2012	Haleakala	Pan-STARRS 1	·	1.4 km	MPC · JPL
762204	2010 XZ_{108}	—	December 2, 2010	Mount Lemmon	Mount Lemmon Survey	·	1.5 km	MPC · JPL
762205	2010 XA_{109}	—	December 3, 2010	Mount Lemmon	Mount Lemmon Survey	HOF	1.7 km	MPC · JPL
762206	2010 XS_{109}	—	December 13, 2010	Mount Lemmon	Mount Lemmon Survey	AGN	810 m	MPC · JPL
762207	2010 XD_{110}	—	December 15, 2010	Mount Lemmon	Mount Lemmon Survey	·	1.6 km	MPC · JPL
762208	2010 XZ_{110}	—	December 14, 2010	Mount Lemmon	Mount Lemmon Survey	·	1.0 km	MPC · JPL
762209	2010 XJ_{111}	—	December 6, 2010	Kitt Peak	Spacewatch	·	570 m	MPC · JPL
762210	2010 XT_{112}	—	December 11, 2010	Mount Lemmon	Mount Lemmon Survey	·	650 m	MPC · JPL
762211	2010 XD_{113}	—	December 1, 2010	Mount Lemmon	Mount Lemmon Survey	·	1.5 km	MPC · JPL
762212	2010 XH_{115}	—	December 3, 2010	Mount Lemmon	Mount Lemmon Survey	·	1.7 km	MPC · JPL
762213	2010 XZ_{115}	—	December 3, 2010	Mount Lemmon	Mount Lemmon Survey	L4	6.7 km	MPC · JPL
762214	2010 XD_{116}	—	December 10, 2010	Mount Lemmon	Mount Lemmon Survey	·	1.7 km	MPC · JPL
762215	2010 XK_{116}	—	October 16, 2009	Mount Lemmon	Mount Lemmon Survey	KOR	1.1 km	MPC · JPL
762216	2010 XT_{116}	—	December 5, 2010	Mount Lemmon	Mount Lemmon Survey	GAL	1.4 km	MPC · JPL
762217	2010 XH_{119}	—	December 2, 2010	Kitt Peak	Spacewatch	L4	6.3 km	MPC · JPL
762218	2010 XS_{119}	—	December 3, 2010	Mount Lemmon	Mount Lemmon Survey	L4	7.9 km	MPC · JPL
762219	2010 YD_{7}	—	December 25, 2010	Kitt Peak	Spacewatch	L4	8.5 km	MPC · JPL
762220	2011 AA_{7}	—	January 2, 2011	Mount Lemmon	Mount Lemmon Survey	·	590 m	MPC · JPL
762221	2011 AP_{7}	—	December 14, 2010	Mount Lemmon	Mount Lemmon Survey	·	730 m	MPC · JPL
762222	2011 AW_{9}	—	January 3, 2011	Mount Lemmon	Mount Lemmon Survey	·	840 m	MPC · JPL
762223	2011 AE_{10}	—	December 14, 2010	Mount Lemmon	Mount Lemmon Survey	·	720 m	MPC · JPL
762224	2011 AG_{17}	—	December 17, 2001	Kitt Peak	Spacewatch	·	1.4 km	MPC · JPL
762225	2011 AL_{17}	—	October 17, 2010	Mount Lemmon	Mount Lemmon Survey	·	620 m	MPC · JPL
762226	2011 AP_{17}	—	November 26, 2010	Mount Lemmon	Mount Lemmon Survey	L4 · 006	8.3 km	MPC · JPL
762227	2011 AS_{17}	—	December 2, 2010	Mount Lemmon	Mount Lemmon Survey	·	630 m	MPC · JPL
762228	2011 AL_{18}	—	January 8, 2011	Mount Lemmon	Mount Lemmon Survey	·	1.7 km	MPC · JPL
762229	2011 AN_{27}	—	January 9, 2011	Kitt Peak	Spacewatch	·	500 m	MPC · JPL
762230	2011 AT_{30}	—	January 9, 2011	Kitt Peak	Spacewatch	·	1.9 km	MPC · JPL
762231	2011 AY_{38}	—	January 10, 2011	Mount Lemmon	Mount Lemmon Survey	·	580 m	MPC · JPL
762232	2011 AA_{41}	—	January 10, 2011	Mount Lemmon	Mount Lemmon Survey	·	680 m	MPC · JPL
762233	2011 AV_{42}	—	January 10, 2011	Mount Lemmon	Mount Lemmon Survey	·	1.5 km	MPC · JPL
762234	2011 AF_{45}	—	January 10, 2011	Kitt Peak	Spacewatch	·	1.5 km	MPC · JPL
762235	2011 AR_{45}	—	January 10, 2011	Kitt Peak	Spacewatch	·	900 m	MPC · JPL
762236	2011 AH_{46}	—	February 7, 1997	Kitt Peak	Spacewatch	·	2.0 km	MPC · JPL
762237	2011 AQ_{49}	—	January 13, 2011	Mount Lemmon	Mount Lemmon Survey	·	580 m	MPC · JPL
762238	2011 AS_{49}	—	January 13, 2011	Mount Lemmon	Mount Lemmon Survey	V	400 m	MPC · JPL
762239	2011 AL_{55}	—	December 14, 2010	Mount Lemmon	Mount Lemmon Survey	·	2.2 km	MPC · JPL
762240	2011 AY_{59}	—	January 12, 2011	Mount Lemmon	Mount Lemmon Survey	·	920 m	MPC · JPL
762241	2011 AU_{60}	—	October 19, 2006	Kitt Peak	Deep Ecliptic Survey	·	560 m	MPC · JPL
762242	2011 AF_{67}	—	January 14, 2011	Mount Lemmon	Mount Lemmon Survey	·	1.3 km	MPC · JPL
762243	2011 AS_{78}	—	January 14, 2011	Kitt Peak	Spacewatch	GAL	1.3 km	MPC · JPL
762244	2011 AB_{82}	—	December 6, 2010	Mount Lemmon	Mount Lemmon Survey	·	1.2 km	MPC · JPL
762245	2011 AB_{83}	—	January 14, 2011	Mount Lemmon	Mount Lemmon Survey	·	480 m	MPC · JPL
762246	2011 AD_{85}	—	January 12, 2011	Catalina	CSS	·	2.1 km	MPC · JPL
762247	2011 AF_{85}	—	October 26, 2013	Mount Lemmon	Mount Lemmon Survey	·	780 m	MPC · JPL
762248	2011 AK_{86}	—	September 19, 2014	Haleakala	Pan-STARRS 1	·	1.2 km	MPC · JPL
762249	2011 AR_{87}	—	January 4, 2011	Mount Lemmon	Mount Lemmon Survey	EUP	2.2 km	MPC · JPL
762250	2011 AX_{89}	—	June 18, 2013	Haleakala	Pan-STARRS 1	NAE	1.9 km	MPC · JPL
762251	2011 AA_{90}	—	January 14, 2011	Mount Lemmon	Mount Lemmon Survey	·	1.6 km	MPC · JPL
762252	2011 AB_{90}	—	January 14, 2011	Mount Lemmon	Mount Lemmon Survey	NYS	750 m	MPC · JPL
762253	2011 AD_{90}	—	January 14, 2011	Mount Lemmon	Mount Lemmon Survey	BRA	1.2 km	MPC · JPL
762254	2011 AA_{91}	—	January 14, 2011	Kitt Peak	Spacewatch	·	700 m	MPC · JPL
762255	2011 AQ_{91}	—	January 14, 2011	Mount Lemmon	Mount Lemmon Survey	PHO	700 m	MPC · JPL
762256	2011 AX_{91}	—	February 17, 2015	Haleakala	Pan-STARRS 1	V	460 m	MPC · JPL
762257	2011 AA_{92}	—	July 13, 2016	Mount Lemmon	Mount Lemmon Survey	·	840 m	MPC · JPL
762258	2011 AC_{92}	—	December 9, 2015	Haleakala	Pan-STARRS 1	·	1.4 km	MPC · JPL
762259	2011 AP_{93}	—	November 23, 2014	Haleakala	Pan-STARRS 1	·	1.6 km	MPC · JPL
762260	2011 AP_{94}	—	January 14, 2011	Mount Lemmon	Mount Lemmon Survey	·	2.1 km	MPC · JPL
762261	2011 AY_{94}	—	January 4, 2011	Mount Lemmon	Mount Lemmon Survey	·	570 m	MPC · JPL
762262	2011 AS_{95}	—	January 2, 2011	Mount Lemmon	Mount Lemmon Survey	KOR	980 m	MPC · JPL
762263	2011 AW_{95}	—	January 3, 2011	Mount Lemmon	Mount Lemmon Survey	·	1.4 km	MPC · JPL
762264	2011 AB_{96}	—	January 14, 2011	Mount Lemmon	Mount Lemmon Survey	L4	6.0 km	MPC · JPL
762265	2011 AD_{96}	—	January 2, 2011	Mount Lemmon	Mount Lemmon Survey	EOS	1.5 km	MPC · JPL
762266	2011 AK_{97}	—	January 3, 2011	Mount Lemmon	Mount Lemmon Survey	·	580 m	MPC · JPL
762267	2011 AA_{98}	—	January 13, 2011	Mount Lemmon	Mount Lemmon Survey	·	1.6 km	MPC · JPL
762268	2011 AH_{98}	—	January 13, 2011	Mount Lemmon	Mount Lemmon Survey	·	570 m	MPC · JPL
762269	2011 AU_{98}	—	January 8, 2011	Mount Lemmon	Mount Lemmon Survey	V	430 m	MPC · JPL
762270	2011 AX_{101}	—	January 10, 2011	Mount Lemmon	Mount Lemmon Survey	·	1.6 km	MPC · JPL
762271	2011 AB_{102}	—	January 14, 2011	Mount Lemmon	Mount Lemmon Survey	·	1.4 km	MPC · JPL
762272	2011 AB_{103}	—	January 8, 2011	Mount Lemmon	Mount Lemmon Survey	VER	1.8 km	MPC · JPL
762273	2011 AJ_{103}	—	January 14, 2011	Mount Lemmon	Mount Lemmon Survey	V	430 m	MPC · JPL
762274	2011 AT_{106}	—	January 14, 2011	Mount Lemmon	Mount Lemmon Survey	EOS	1.4 km	MPC · JPL
762275	2011 AW_{107}	—	January 14, 2011	Mount Lemmon	Mount Lemmon Survey	·	1.6 km	MPC · JPL
762276	2011 AE_{110}	—	January 14, 2011	Mount Lemmon	Mount Lemmon Survey	·	1.7 km	MPC · JPL
762277	2011 BF_{4}	—	January 16, 2011	Mount Lemmon	Mount Lemmon Survey	·	650 m	MPC · JPL
762278	2011 BZ_{12}	—	January 24, 2011	Mount Lemmon	Mount Lemmon Survey	L4	7.2 km	MPC · JPL
762279	2011 BP_{16}	—	January 26, 2011	Mount Lemmon	Mount Lemmon Survey	·	1.2 km	MPC · JPL
762280	2011 BL_{18}	—	January 26, 2011	Kitt Peak	Spacewatch	·	590 m	MPC · JPL
762281	2011 BD_{23}	—	January 26, 2011	Kitt Peak	Spacewatch	·	1.3 km	MPC · JPL
762282	2011 BL_{23}	—	November 15, 2006	Mount Lemmon	Mount Lemmon Survey	·	560 m	MPC · JPL
762283	2011 BW_{23}	—	January 13, 2011	Kitt Peak	Spacewatch	·	840 m	MPC · JPL
762284	2011 BQ_{25}	—	August 19, 2006	Kitt Peak	Spacewatch	·	520 m	MPC · JPL
762285	2011 BX_{25}	—	January 23, 2011	Mount Lemmon	Mount Lemmon Survey	·	1.6 km	MPC · JPL
762286	2011 BN_{29}	—	August 23, 2003	Cerro Tololo	Deep Ecliptic Survey	·	1.8 km	MPC · JPL
762287	2011 BB_{30}	—	January 26, 2011	Mount Lemmon	Mount Lemmon Survey	·	1.3 km	MPC · JPL
762288	2011 BG_{30}	—	January 26, 2011	Mount Lemmon	Mount Lemmon Survey	·	500 m	MPC · JPL
762289	2011 BY_{35}	—	January 28, 2011	Mount Lemmon	Mount Lemmon Survey	·	1.5 km	MPC · JPL
762290	2011 BO_{37}	—	January 28, 2011	Mount Lemmon	Mount Lemmon Survey	·	640 m	MPC · JPL
762291	2011 BC_{41}	—	January 30, 2011	Piszkés-tető	K. Sárneczky, Z. Kuli	·	2.1 km	MPC · JPL
762292	2011 BE_{41}	—	October 19, 2006	Kitt Peak	Spacewatch	·	650 m	MPC · JPL
762293	2011 BX_{41}	—	January 30, 2011	Piszkés-tető	K. Sárneczky, Z. Kuli	·	2.2 km	MPC · JPL
762294	2011 BC_{44}	—	January 30, 2011	Piszkés-tető	K. Sárneczky, Z. Kuli	·	1.5 km	MPC · JPL
762295	2011 BH_{45}	—	January 29, 2011	Mount Lemmon	Mount Lemmon Survey	·	2.1 km	MPC · JPL
762296	2011 BL_{46}	—	January 30, 2011	Piszkés-tető	K. Sárneczky, Z. Kuli	·	730 m	MPC · JPL
762297	2011 BV_{47}	—	January 31, 2011	Piszkés-tető	K. Sárneczky, Z. Kuli	·	1.6 km	MPC · JPL
762298	2011 BH_{49}	—	January 31, 2011	Piszkés-tető	K. Sárneczky, Z. Kuli	·	1.4 km	MPC · JPL
762299	2011 BV_{54}	—	December 3, 2005	Mauna Kea	A. Boattini	·	2.2 km	MPC · JPL
762300	2011 BA_{57}	—	January 25, 2011	Mount Lemmon	Mount Lemmon Survey	·	2.1 km	MPC · JPL

== 762301–762400 ==
back to top

Designation			Discovery			Properties		Ref
Permanent	Provisional	Named after	Date	Site	Discoverer(s)	Category	Diam.	Ref
762301	2011 BH_{62}	—	January 26, 2011	Mount Lemmon	Mount Lemmon Survey	·	2.2 km	MPC · JPL
762302	2011 BG_{66}	—	January 31, 2011	Piszkés-tető	K. Sárneczky, Z. Kuli	EOS	1.3 km	MPC · JPL
762303	2011 BY_{68}	—	January 29, 2011	Mount Lemmon	Mount Lemmon Survey	·	540 m	MPC · JPL
762304	2011 BR_{69}	—	January 26, 2011	Mount Lemmon	Mount Lemmon Survey	·	2.0 km	MPC · JPL
762305	2011 BP_{71}	—	February 1, 2006	Mount Lemmon	Mount Lemmon Survey	·	1.1 km	MPC · JPL
762306	2011 BB_{74}	—	February 5, 2011	Haleakala	Pan-STARRS 1	·	820 m	MPC · JPL
762307	2011 BE_{75}	—	February 5, 2011	Haleakala	Pan-STARRS 1	·	1.7 km	MPC · JPL
762308	2011 BN_{80}	—	January 27, 2011	Mount Lemmon	Mount Lemmon Survey	·	720 m	MPC · JPL
762309	2011 BJ_{81}	—	January 13, 2011	Kitt Peak	Spacewatch	·	610 m	MPC · JPL
762310	2011 BU_{98}	—	January 10, 2011	Mount Lemmon	Mount Lemmon Survey	PHO	860 m	MPC · JPL
762311	2011 BV_{101}	—	February 6, 2011	Mount Lemmon	Mount Lemmon Survey	NYS	790 m	MPC · JPL
762312	2011 BP_{104}	—	January 9, 2011	Kitt Peak	Spacewatch	KOR	1.1 km	MPC · JPL
762313	2011 BB_{111}	—	February 5, 2011	Haleakala	Pan-STARRS 1	·	1.2 km	MPC · JPL
762314	2011 BU_{111}	—	December 6, 2005	Kitt Peak	Spacewatch	·	1.2 km	MPC · JPL
762315	2011 BZ_{111}	—	February 25, 2011	Mount Lemmon	Mount Lemmon Survey	MAS	500 m	MPC · JPL
762316	2011 BK_{115}	—	January 23, 2011	Mount Lemmon	Mount Lemmon Survey	·	1.2 km	MPC · JPL
762317	2011 BX_{115}	—	December 5, 2010	Mount Lemmon	Mount Lemmon Survey	·	1.5 km	MPC · JPL
762318	2011 BK_{116}	—	December 5, 2010	Mount Lemmon	Mount Lemmon Survey	·	510 m	MPC · JPL
762319	2011 BO_{116}	—	January 10, 2011	Mount Lemmon	Mount Lemmon Survey	·	790 m	MPC · JPL
762320	2011 BS_{119}	—	January 14, 2011	Kitt Peak	Spacewatch	·	1.0 km	MPC · JPL
762321	2011 BW_{124}	—	August 23, 2014	Haleakala	Pan-STARRS 1	·	1.5 km	MPC · JPL
762322	2011 BA_{127}	—	January 27, 2011	Mount Lemmon	Mount Lemmon Survey	THB	2.4 km	MPC · JPL
762323	2011 BH_{127}	—	October 3, 2006	Mount Lemmon	Mount Lemmon Survey	·	810 m	MPC · JPL
762324	2011 BO_{128}	—	January 28, 2011	Mount Lemmon	Mount Lemmon Survey	·	660 m	MPC · JPL
762325	2011 BE_{130}	—	January 28, 2011	Mount Lemmon	Mount Lemmon Survey	·	2.0 km	MPC · JPL
762326	2011 BO_{132}	—	March 29, 2004	Kitt Peak	Spacewatch	·	690 m	MPC · JPL
762327	2011 BB_{135}	—	January 29, 2011	Mount Lemmon	Mount Lemmon Survey	·	2.2 km	MPC · JPL
762328	2011 BV_{137}	—	January 14, 2011	Kitt Peak	Spacewatch	BRA	1.1 km	MPC · JPL
762329	2011 BN_{140}	—	January 29, 2011	Mount Lemmon	Mount Lemmon Survey	·	2.2 km	MPC · JPL
762330	2011 BR_{140}	—	January 8, 2011	Mount Lemmon	Mount Lemmon Survey	·	1.4 km	MPC · JPL
762331	2011 BP_{148}	—	January 29, 2011	Mount Lemmon	Mount Lemmon Survey	·	500 m	MPC · JPL
762332	2011 BN_{150}	—	January 29, 2011	Mount Lemmon	Mount Lemmon Survey	TRE	1.7 km	MPC · JPL
762333	2011 BD_{153}	—	November 16, 2010	Mount Lemmon	Mount Lemmon Survey	·	2.6 km	MPC · JPL
762334	2011 BE_{158}	—	January 29, 2011	Mount Lemmon	Mount Lemmon Survey	·	1.5 km	MPC · JPL
762335	2011 BX_{158}	—	January 29, 2011	Mount Lemmon	Mount Lemmon Survey	·	1.3 km	MPC · JPL
762336	2011 BW_{159}	—	January 29, 2011	Mount Lemmon	Mount Lemmon Survey	·	1.8 km	MPC · JPL
762337	2011 BV_{162}	—	January 16, 2011	Mount Lemmon	Mount Lemmon Survey	NYS	820 m	MPC · JPL
762338	2011 BW_{163}	—	April 14, 2008	Kitt Peak	Spacewatch	·	820 m	MPC · JPL
762339	2011 BD_{166}	—	January 15, 2011	Mount Lemmon	Mount Lemmon Survey	·	810 m	MPC · JPL
762340	2011 BU_{171}	—	February 12, 2011	Mount Lemmon	Mount Lemmon Survey	·	610 m	MPC · JPL
762341	2011 BS_{172}	—	April 27, 2012	Haleakala	Pan-STARRS 1	·	2.3 km	MPC · JPL
762342	2011 BU_{172}	—	February 10, 2011	Mount Lemmon	Mount Lemmon Survey	EOS	1.3 km	MPC · JPL
762343	2011 BO_{173}	—	March 16, 2012	Kitt Peak	Spacewatch	·	1.7 km	MPC · JPL
762344	2011 BF_{174}	—	February 13, 2011	Mount Lemmon	Mount Lemmon Survey	EOS	1.3 km	MPC · JPL
762345	2011 BR_{174}	—	February 4, 2011	Catalina	CSS	·	690 m	MPC · JPL
762346	2011 BB_{175}	—	March 5, 2011	Mount Lemmon	Mount Lemmon Survey	·	610 m	MPC · JPL
762347	2011 BS_{175}	—	August 31, 2014	Kitt Peak	Spacewatch	·	1.4 km	MPC · JPL
762348	2011 BB_{176}	—	April 30, 2012	Kitt Peak	Spacewatch	·	1.9 km	MPC · JPL
762349	2011 BR_{176}	—	February 5, 2011	Mount Lemmon	Mount Lemmon Survey	·	830 m	MPC · JPL
762350	2011 BL_{177}	—	January 17, 2011	Mount Lemmon	Mount Lemmon Survey	·	1.5 km	MPC · JPL
762351	2011 BC_{178}	—	March 11, 2016	Haleakala	Pan-STARRS 1	·	1.3 km	MPC · JPL
762352	2011 BX_{181}	—	February 24, 2017	Haleakala	Pan-STARRS 1	·	2.3 km	MPC · JPL
762353	2011 BP_{183}	—	February 8, 2011	Mount Lemmon	Mount Lemmon Survey	·	2.0 km	MPC · JPL
762354	2011 BO_{184}	—	February 6, 2016	Haleakala	Pan-STARRS 1	·	1.5 km	MPC · JPL
762355	2011 BV_{184}	—	January 28, 2011	Mount Lemmon	Mount Lemmon Survey	·	2.1 km	MPC · JPL
762356	2011 BE_{186}	—	August 2, 2016	Haleakala	Pan-STARRS 1	·	920 m	MPC · JPL
762357	2011 BE_{187}	—	February 7, 2011	Mount Lemmon	Mount Lemmon Survey	H	400 m	MPC · JPL
762358	2011 BD_{188}	—	November 8, 2013	Kitt Peak	Spacewatch	·	760 m	MPC · JPL
762359	2011 BO_{188}	—	January 30, 2011	Haleakala	Pan-STARRS 1	ELF	2.9 km	MPC · JPL
762360	2011 BT_{188}	—	March 29, 2012	Haleakala	Pan-STARRS 1	·	1.6 km	MPC · JPL
762361	2011 BO_{189}	—	May 23, 2012	Mount Lemmon	Mount Lemmon Survey	V	430 m	MPC · JPL
762362	2011 BB_{190}	—	May 14, 2015	Haleakala	Pan-STARRS 2	·	680 m	MPC · JPL
762363	2011 BG_{191}	—	January 16, 2011	Mount Lemmon	Mount Lemmon Survey	·	530 m	MPC · JPL
762364	2011 BG_{192}	—	February 25, 2011	Mount Lemmon	Mount Lemmon Survey	·	1.4 km	MPC · JPL
762365	2011 BJ_{192}	—	February 7, 2011	Mount Lemmon	Mount Lemmon Survey	·	1.2 km	MPC · JPL
762366	2011 BK_{192}	—	May 29, 2012	Mount Lemmon	Mount Lemmon Survey	GEF	790 m	MPC · JPL
762367	2011 BL_{192}	—	July 14, 2013	Haleakala	Pan-STARRS 1	·	1.2 km	MPC · JPL
762368	2011 BN_{192}	—	July 8, 2018	Haleakala	Pan-STARRS 2	·	1.3 km	MPC · JPL
762369	2011 BO_{192}	—	January 30, 2011	Haleakala	Pan-STARRS 1	V	390 m	MPC · JPL
762370	2011 BX_{193}	—	March 25, 2011	Mount Lemmon	Mount Lemmon Survey	BRA	1.1 km	MPC · JPL
762371	2011 BK_{196}	—	January 29, 2011	Kitt Peak	Spacewatch	·	890 m	MPC · JPL
762372	2011 BR_{196}	—	December 5, 2010	Mount Lemmon	Mount Lemmon Survey	·	760 m	MPC · JPL
762373	2011 BY_{199}	—	January 27, 2011	Mount Lemmon	Mount Lemmon Survey	·	690 m	MPC · JPL
762374	2011 BB_{200}	—	January 30, 2011	Mount Lemmon	Mount Lemmon Survey	WIT	820 m	MPC · JPL
762375	2011 BW_{200}	—	January 27, 2011	Mount Lemmon	Mount Lemmon Survey	·	1.4 km	MPC · JPL
762376	2011 BF_{207}	—	March 13, 2008	Kitt Peak	Spacewatch	V	480 m	MPC · JPL
762377	2011 BB_{208}	—	January 16, 2011	Mount Lemmon	Mount Lemmon Survey	·	1.3 km	MPC · JPL
762378	2011 BQ_{211}	—	January 24, 2011	Kitt Peak	Spacewatch	·	890 m	MPC · JPL
762379	2011 CG_{2}	—	January 11, 2011	Catalina	CSS	APO · PHA	190 m	MPC · JPL
762380	2011 CW_{3}	—	November 10, 2005	Mount Lemmon	Mount Lemmon Survey	·	950 m	MPC · JPL
762381	2011 CP_{5}	—	April 16, 2004	Kitt Peak	Spacewatch	NYS	1 km	MPC · JPL
762382	2011 CZ_{5}	—	February 5, 2011	Mount Lemmon	Mount Lemmon Survey	EOS	1.4 km	MPC · JPL
762383	2011 CR_{13}	—	January 31, 2011	Piszkéstető	Kuli, Z., K. Sárneczky	·	1.6 km	MPC · JPL
762384	2011 CZ_{18}	—	February 4, 2011	Mayhill-ISON	L. Elenin	·	690 m	MPC · JPL
762385	2011 CX_{23}	—	February 7, 2011	Mount Lemmon	Mount Lemmon Survey	·	1.3 km	MPC · JPL
762386	2011 CR_{26}	—	January 14, 2011	Kitt Peak	Spacewatch	·	1.5 km	MPC · JPL
762387	2011 CE_{48}	—	February 5, 2011	Catalina	CSS	·	740 m	MPC · JPL
762388	2011 CE_{55}	—	February 3, 2000	Kitt Peak	Spacewatch	·	2.0 km	MPC · JPL
762389	2011 CN_{58}	—	October 29, 2005	Mount Lemmon	Mount Lemmon Survey	·	1.3 km	MPC · JPL
762390	2011 CT_{61}	—	February 8, 2011	Mount Lemmon	Mount Lemmon Survey	·	2.2 km	MPC · JPL
762391	2011 CV_{62}	—	January 24, 2011	Mount Lemmon	Mount Lemmon Survey	NYS	890 m	MPC · JPL
762392	2011 CL_{63}	—	January 10, 2011	Kitt Peak	Spacewatch	PHO	580 m	MPC · JPL
762393	2011 CP_{63}	—	February 10, 2011	Mount Lemmon	Mount Lemmon Survey	·	1.4 km	MPC · JPL
762394	2011 CV_{63}	—	February 10, 2011	Mount Lemmon	Mount Lemmon Survey	KOR	1.1 km	MPC · JPL
762395	2011 CL_{66}	—	December 13, 2010	Mount Lemmon	Mount Lemmon Survey	·	1.6 km	MPC · JPL
762396	2011 CT_{76}	—	February 10, 2011	Mount Lemmon	Mount Lemmon Survey	·	2.2 km	MPC · JPL
762397	2011 CO_{77}	—	October 27, 2006	Mount Lemmon	Mount Lemmon Survey	·	500 m	MPC · JPL
762398	2011 CR_{78}	—	February 10, 2011	Mount Lemmon	Mount Lemmon Survey	·	2.1 km	MPC · JPL
762399	2011 CX_{78}	—	February 10, 2011	Mount Lemmon	Mount Lemmon Survey	·	2.1 km	MPC · JPL
762400	2011 CG_{79}	—	March 20, 2007	Mount Lemmon	Mount Lemmon Survey	·	960 m	MPC · JPL

== 762401–762500 ==
back to top

Designation			Discovery			Properties		Ref
Permanent	Provisional	Named after	Date	Site	Discoverer(s)	Category	Diam.	Ref
762401	2011 CT_{79}	—	November 17, 2009	Mount Lemmon	Mount Lemmon Survey	·	2.2 km	MPC · JPL
762402	2011 CZ_{84}	—	February 5, 2011	Haleakala	Pan-STARRS 1	·	1.8 km	MPC · JPL
762403	2011 CG_{95}	—	March 16, 2004	Kitt Peak	Spacewatch	MAS	500 m	MPC · JPL
762404	2011 CH_{97}	—	March 2, 2011	Mount Lemmon	Mount Lemmon Survey	·	750 m	MPC · JPL
762405	2011 CF_{99}	—	February 5, 2011	Haleakala	Pan-STARRS 1	·	1.5 km	MPC · JPL
762406	2011 CP_{101}	—	February 5, 2011	Haleakala	Pan-STARRS 1	·	870 m	MPC · JPL
762407	2011 CB_{104}	—	November 9, 2009	Mount Lemmon	Mount Lemmon Survey	·	1.3 km	MPC · JPL
762408	2011 CU_{106}	—	February 25, 2011	Mount Lemmon	Mount Lemmon Survey	·	1.4 km	MPC · JPL
762409	2011 CG_{110}	—	February 5, 2011	Haleakala	Pan-STARRS 1	·	1.3 km	MPC · JPL
762410	2011 CW_{115}	—	February 5, 2011	Haleakala	Pan-STARRS 1	·	900 m	MPC · JPL
762411	2011 CO_{116}	—	February 25, 2011	Mount Lemmon	Mount Lemmon Survey	KOR	1.1 km	MPC · JPL
762412	2011 CV_{122}	—	February 13, 2011	Mount Lemmon	Mount Lemmon Survey	·	2.4 km	MPC · JPL
762413	2011 CQ_{123}	—	January 26, 2011	Kitt Peak	Spacewatch	·	740 m	MPC · JPL
762414	2011 CX_{123}	—	November 27, 2014	Haleakala	Pan-STARRS 1	·	1.6 km	MPC · JPL
762415	2011 CA_{125}	—	February 5, 2016	Haleakala	Pan-STARRS 1	·	1.6 km	MPC · JPL
762416	2011 CR_{125}	—	June 23, 2018	Haleakala	Pan-STARRS 1	·	1.4 km	MPC · JPL
762417	2011 CW_{125}	—	October 2, 2014	Haleakala	Pan-STARRS 1	·	1.4 km	MPC · JPL
762418	2011 CP_{127}	—	January 16, 2016	Haleakala	Pan-STARRS 1	·	2.1 km	MPC · JPL
762419	2011 CT_{127}	—	April 5, 2016	Haleakala	Pan-STARRS 1	·	1.0 km	MPC · JPL
762420	2011 CF_{128}	—	February 12, 2011	Mount Lemmon	Mount Lemmon Survey	·	2.4 km	MPC · JPL
762421	2011 CO_{128}	—	February 7, 2011	Mount Lemmon	Mount Lemmon Survey	·	1.9 km	MPC · JPL
762422	2011 CR_{128}	—	February 13, 2011	Mount Lemmon	Mount Lemmon Survey	·	1.4 km	MPC · JPL
762423	2011 CZ_{128}	—	February 12, 2011	Mount Lemmon	Mount Lemmon Survey	·	930 m	MPC · JPL
762424	2011 CL_{130}	—	February 10, 2011	Mount Lemmon	Mount Lemmon Survey	·	830 m	MPC · JPL
762425	2011 CS_{130}	—	February 13, 2011	Mount Lemmon	Mount Lemmon Survey	·	900 m	MPC · JPL
762426	2011 CB_{131}	—	February 5, 2011	Haleakala	Pan-STARRS 1	T_{j} (2.96)	3.1 km	MPC · JPL
762427	2011 CE_{131}	—	February 7, 2011	Mount Lemmon	Mount Lemmon Survey	·	1.3 km	MPC · JPL
762428	2011 CN_{131}	—	February 8, 2011	Mount Lemmon	Mount Lemmon Survey	·	1.6 km	MPC · JPL
762429	2011 CT_{132}	—	February 5, 2011	Haleakala	Pan-STARRS 1	·	2.5 km	MPC · JPL
762430	2011 CG_{133}	—	February 7, 2011	Mount Lemmon	Mount Lemmon Survey	·	950 m	MPC · JPL
762431	2011 CH_{133}	—	February 7, 2011	Mount Lemmon	Mount Lemmon Survey	·	950 m	MPC · JPL
762432	2011 CU_{133}	—	February 10, 2011	Mount Lemmon	Mount Lemmon Survey	EOS	1.5 km	MPC · JPL
762433	2011 CO_{134}	—	February 9, 2016	Haleakala	Pan-STARRS 1	·	1.9 km	MPC · JPL
762434	2011 CQ_{135}	—	February 10, 2011	Mount Lemmon	Mount Lemmon Survey	·	600 m	MPC · JPL
762435	2011 CQ_{137}	—	February 5, 2011	Haleakala	Pan-STARRS 1	·	2.5 km	MPC · JPL
762436	2011 CH_{138}	—	February 6, 2016	Haleakala	Pan-STARRS 1	AGN	790 m	MPC · JPL
762437	2011 CL_{138}	—	February 8, 2011	Mount Lemmon	Mount Lemmon Survey	·	1.5 km	MPC · JPL
762438	2011 CY_{138}	—	February 5, 2011	Haleakala	Pan-STARRS 1	·	1.4 km	MPC · JPL
762439	2011 CA_{139}	—	February 8, 2011	Mount Lemmon	Mount Lemmon Survey	·	1.3 km	MPC · JPL
762440	2011 CG_{139}	—	February 7, 2011	Mount Lemmon	Mount Lemmon Survey	AGN	970 m	MPC · JPL
762441	2011 CM_{139}	—	February 7, 2011	Mount Lemmon	Mount Lemmon Survey	·	1.4 km	MPC · JPL
762442	2011 CQ_{140}	—	February 8, 2011	Mount Lemmon	Mount Lemmon Survey	·	1.6 km	MPC · JPL
762443	2011 CL_{142}	—	February 11, 2011	Mount Lemmon	Mount Lemmon Survey	·	1.1 km	MPC · JPL
762444	2011 CU_{142}	—	February 5, 2011	Mount Lemmon	Mount Lemmon Survey	·	950 m	MPC · JPL
762445	2011 CZ_{142}	—	February 5, 2011	Mount Lemmon	Mount Lemmon Survey	·	2.4 km	MPC · JPL
762446	2011 DE_{9}	—	February 25, 2011	Mount Lemmon	Mount Lemmon Survey	·	800 m	MPC · JPL
762447	2011 DP_{9}	—	February 25, 2011	Mount Lemmon	Mount Lemmon Survey	·	790 m	MPC · JPL
762448	2011 DZ_{23}	—	February 26, 2011	Kitt Peak	Spacewatch	EUP	2.6 km	MPC · JPL
762449	2011 DS_{26}	—	April 29, 2008	Mount Lemmon	Mount Lemmon Survey	·	620 m	MPC · JPL
762450	2011 DH_{32}	—	February 25, 2011	Mount Lemmon	Mount Lemmon Survey	·	960 m	MPC · JPL
762451	2011 DM_{32}	—	February 25, 2011	Mount Lemmon	Mount Lemmon Survey	THM	1.7 km	MPC · JPL
762452	2011 DD_{36}	—	February 25, 2011	Mount Lemmon	Mount Lemmon Survey	·	1.1 km	MPC · JPL
762453	2011 DB_{37}	—	January 23, 2006	Kitt Peak	Spacewatch	·	1.3 km	MPC · JPL
762454	2011 DO_{41}	—	February 25, 2011	Mount Lemmon	Mount Lemmon Survey	NYS	730 m	MPC · JPL
762455	2011 DZ_{43}	—	February 26, 2011	Mount Lemmon	Mount Lemmon Survey	MAS	630 m	MPC · JPL
762456	2011 DZ_{52}	—	April 13, 2004	Kitt Peak	Spacewatch	·	790 m	MPC · JPL
762457	2011 DK_{53}	—	February 25, 2011	Mount Lemmon	Mount Lemmon Survey	·	1.7 km	MPC · JPL
762458	2011 DG_{54}	—	February 25, 2011	Mount Lemmon	Mount Lemmon Survey	MAS	510 m	MPC · JPL
762459	2011 DK_{54}	—	February 25, 2011	Mount Lemmon	Mount Lemmon Survey	MAS	510 m	MPC · JPL
762460	2011 DO_{54}	—	February 25, 2011	Mount Lemmon	Mount Lemmon Survey	·	660 m	MPC · JPL
762461	2011 DR_{54}	—	January 7, 2016	Haleakala	Pan-STARRS 1	·	1.9 km	MPC · JPL
762462	2011 DF_{55}	—	February 8, 2011	Mount Lemmon	Mount Lemmon Survey	·	2.4 km	MPC · JPL
762463	2011 DG_{55}	—	March 30, 2015	Haleakala	Pan-STARRS 1	·	900 m	MPC · JPL
762464	2011 DP_{55}	—	February 26, 2011	Kitt Peak	Spacewatch	·	1.7 km	MPC · JPL
762465	2011 DV_{55}	—	January 4, 2016	Haleakala	Pan-STARRS 1	·	2.2 km	MPC · JPL
762466	2011 DX_{55}	—	February 25, 2011	Kitt Peak	Spacewatch	·	1.3 km	MPC · JPL
762467	2011 DL_{56}	—	February 25, 2011	Mount Lemmon	Mount Lemmon Survey	·	1.5 km	MPC · JPL
762468	2011 DL_{57}	—	February 25, 2011	Mount Lemmon	Mount Lemmon Survey	·	1.3 km	MPC · JPL
762469	2011 DR_{57}	—	February 26, 2011	Mount Lemmon	Mount Lemmon Survey	·	860 m	MPC · JPL
762470	2011 DT_{57}	—	February 25, 2011	Mount Lemmon	Mount Lemmon Survey	V	430 m	MPC · JPL
762471	2011 DN_{60}	—	December 13, 2006	Kitt Peak	Spacewatch	·	770 m	MPC · JPL
762472	2011 EU_{12}	—	January 28, 2011	Catalina	CSS	TIR	2.9 km	MPC · JPL
762473	2011 ES_{19}	—	November 21, 2006	Mount Lemmon	Mount Lemmon Survey	·	730 m	MPC · JPL
762474	2011 EB_{26}	—	March 6, 2011	Mount Lemmon	Mount Lemmon Survey	NYS	870 m	MPC · JPL
762475	2011 EY_{26}	—	February 25, 2011	Kitt Peak	Spacewatch	·	1.0 km	MPC · JPL
762476	2011 EY_{32}	—	March 4, 2011	Mount Lemmon	Mount Lemmon Survey	·	1.5 km	MPC · JPL
762477	2011 ET_{37}	—	March 6, 2011	Kitt Peak	Spacewatch	BRA	1.1 km	MPC · JPL
762478	2011 ES_{48}	—	March 10, 2011	Mount Lemmon	Mount Lemmon Survey	·	2.4 km	MPC · JPL
762479	2011 EC_{52}	—	March 9, 2011	Kitt Peak	Spacewatch	·	880 m	MPC · JPL
762480	2011 ED_{57}	—	March 12, 2011	Mount Lemmon	Mount Lemmon Survey	·	760 m	MPC · JPL
762481	2011 ER_{59}	—	March 12, 2011	Mount Lemmon	Mount Lemmon Survey	·	1.4 km	MPC · JPL
762482	2011 EZ_{59}	—	March 12, 2011	Mount Lemmon	Mount Lemmon Survey	·	1.4 km	MPC · JPL
762483	2011 EZ_{61}	—	March 12, 2011	Mount Lemmon	Mount Lemmon Survey	VER	2.2 km	MPC · JPL
762484	2011 EL_{69}	—	March 10, 2011	Kitt Peak	Spacewatch	·	700 m	MPC · JPL
762485	2011 EH_{71}	—	March 2, 2011	Kitt Peak	Spacewatch	·	1.9 km	MPC · JPL
762486	2011 EM_{82}	—	February 23, 2011	Kitt Peak	Spacewatch	·	800 m	MPC · JPL
762487	2011 EO_{87}	—	March 3, 2011	Mount Lemmon	Mount Lemmon Survey	·	1.9 km	MPC · JPL
762488	2011 EC_{88}	—	February 13, 2011	Mount Lemmon	Mount Lemmon Survey	·	1.1 km	MPC · JPL
762489	2011 ET_{89}	—	March 6, 2011	Mount Lemmon	Mount Lemmon Survey	KOR	1.2 km	MPC · JPL
762490	2011 EU_{90}	—	November 25, 2006	Kitt Peak	Spacewatch	·	660 m	MPC · JPL
762491	2011 EJ_{92}	—	March 4, 2011	Mount Lemmon	Mount Lemmon Survey	NYS	740 m	MPC · JPL
762492	2011 EK_{92}	—	March 6, 2011	Mount Lemmon	Mount Lemmon Survey	NYS	760 m	MPC · JPL
762493	2011 ET_{92}	—	July 14, 2013	Haleakala	Pan-STARRS 1	TEL	1.1 km	MPC · JPL
762494	2011 EG_{93}	—	March 4, 2011	Mount Lemmon	Mount Lemmon Survey	·	920 m	MPC · JPL
762495	2011 EH_{93}	—	March 2, 2011	Kitt Peak	Spacewatch	MAS	480 m	MPC · JPL
762496	2011 ET_{94}	—	March 11, 2011	Mount Lemmon	Mount Lemmon Survey	·	2.3 km	MPC · JPL
762497	2011 EE_{95}	—	March 6, 2011	Kitt Peak	Spacewatch	·	820 m	MPC · JPL
762498	2011 EK_{95}	—	March 14, 2011	Mount Lemmon	Mount Lemmon Survey	·	1.9 km	MPC · JPL
762499	2011 ER_{95}	—	August 17, 2012	Haleakala	Pan-STARRS 1	·	800 m	MPC · JPL
762500	2011 ET_{95}	—	November 21, 2014	Haleakala	Pan-STARRS 1	·	1.8 km	MPC · JPL

== 762501–762600 ==
back to top

Designation			Discovery			Properties		Ref
Permanent	Provisional	Named after	Date	Site	Discoverer(s)	Category	Diam.	Ref
762501	2011 EE_{96}	—	October 9, 2013	Mount Lemmon	Mount Lemmon Survey	LIX	2.8 km	MPC · JPL
762502	2011 EK_{96}	—	September 25, 2003	Mauna Kea	P. A. Wiegert	·	1.2 km	MPC · JPL
762503	2011 EN_{96}	—	March 9, 2011	Mount Lemmon	Mount Lemmon Survey	V	530 m	MPC · JPL
762504	2011 ET_{96}	—	February 11, 2016	Haleakala	Pan-STARRS 1	BRA	1.2 km	MPC · JPL
762505	2011 EX_{96}	—	October 26, 2013	Kitt Peak	Spacewatch	MAS	490 m	MPC · JPL
762506	2011 EE_{97}	—	October 31, 2013	Mount Lemmon	Mount Lemmon Survey	·	780 m	MPC · JPL
762507	2011 EU_{97}	—	July 13, 2013	Haleakala	Pan-STARRS 1	URS	2.5 km	MPC · JPL
762508	2011 ER_{98}	—	March 1, 2011	Mount Lemmon	Mount Lemmon Survey	·	1.4 km	MPC · JPL
762509	2011 EF_{99}	—	September 15, 2013	Catalina	CSS	·	2.8 km	MPC · JPL
762510	2011 EG_{99}	—	August 15, 2013	Haleakala	Pan-STARRS 1	·	2.2 km	MPC · JPL
762511	2011 EJ_{99}	—	November 28, 2013	Mount Lemmon	Mount Lemmon Survey	V	430 m	MPC · JPL
762512	2011 ET_{99}	—	July 10, 2018	Haleakala	Pan-STARRS 1	EOS	1.5 km	MPC · JPL
762513	2011 EU_{99}	—	August 8, 2005	Cerro Tololo	Deep Ecliptic Survey	·	650 m	MPC · JPL
762514	2011 EW_{100}	—	March 6, 2011	Mount Lemmon	Mount Lemmon Survey	·	1.5 km	MPC · JPL
762515	2011 EZ_{100}	—	March 13, 2011	Mount Lemmon	Mount Lemmon Survey	EOS	1.4 km	MPC · JPL
762516	2011 EG_{101}	—	March 9, 2011	Mount Lemmon	Mount Lemmon Survey	·	790 m	MPC · JPL
762517	2011 EH_{101}	—	March 14, 2011	Mount Lemmon	Mount Lemmon Survey	·	1.5 km	MPC · JPL
762518	2011 EC_{103}	—	March 10, 2011	Kitt Peak	Spacewatch	·	2.1 km	MPC · JPL
762519	2011 EF_{103}	—	March 1, 2011	Mount Lemmon	Mount Lemmon Survey	·	1.8 km	MPC · JPL
762520	2011 EJ_{103}	—	March 14, 2011	Mount Lemmon	Mount Lemmon Survey	·	940 m	MPC · JPL
762521	2011 EN_{103}	—	March 6, 2011	Mount Lemmon	Mount Lemmon Survey	·	600 m	MPC · JPL
762522	2011 EN_{104}	—	March 9, 2011	Mount Lemmon	Mount Lemmon Survey	·	730 m	MPC · JPL
762523	2011 EJ_{105}	—	March 6, 2011	Mount Lemmon	Mount Lemmon Survey	·	880 m	MPC · JPL
762524	2011 EX_{109}	—	March 6, 2011	Mount Lemmon	Mount Lemmon Survey	·	700 m	MPC · JPL
762525	2011 EY_{111}	—	March 2, 2011	Kitt Peak	Spacewatch	·	860 m	MPC · JPL
762526	2011 EM_{112}	—	March 14, 2011	Mount Lemmon	Mount Lemmon Survey	·	1.5 km	MPC · JPL
762527	2011 EF_{113}	—	March 6, 2011	Kitt Peak	Spacewatch	·	730 m	MPC · JPL
762528	2011 EA_{116}	—	March 14, 2011	Mount Lemmon	Mount Lemmon Survey	·	1.7 km	MPC · JPL
762529	2011 FM_{11}	—	February 17, 2007	Kitt Peak	Spacewatch	NYS	950 m	MPC · JPL
762530	2011 FX_{19}	—	March 29, 2011	Kitt Peak	Spacewatch	·	1.9 km	MPC · JPL
762531	2011 FK_{20}	—	March 29, 2011	Mount Lemmon	Mount Lemmon Survey	·	820 m	MPC · JPL
762532	2011 FR_{26}	—	March 30, 2011	Piszkés-tető	K. Sárneczky, Z. Kuli	PHO	710 m	MPC · JPL
762533	2011 FD_{27}	—	March 30, 2011	Piszkés-tető	K. Sárneczky, Z. Kuli	EOS	1.5 km	MPC · JPL
762534	2011 FO_{35}	—	March 29, 2011	Mount Lemmon	Mount Lemmon Survey	·	1.4 km	MPC · JPL
762535	2011 FT_{41}	—	March 26, 2011	Mount Lemmon	Mount Lemmon Survey	·	2.0 km	MPC · JPL
762536	2011 FO_{44}	—	March 13, 2011	Kitt Peak	Spacewatch	MAS	630 m	MPC · JPL
762537	2011 FR_{45}	—	March 25, 2011	Kitt Peak	Spacewatch	·	940 m	MPC · JPL
762538	2011 FD_{50}	—	March 30, 2011	Mount Lemmon	Mount Lemmon Survey	·	1.8 km	MPC · JPL
762539	2011 FM_{57}	—	March 30, 2011	Mount Lemmon	Mount Lemmon Survey	·	2.2 km	MPC · JPL
762540	2011 FW_{57}	—	March 30, 2011	Mount Lemmon	Mount Lemmon Survey	·	2.0 km	MPC · JPL
762541	2011 FD_{58}	—	December 1, 2006	Mount Lemmon	Mount Lemmon Survey	·	720 m	MPC · JPL
762542	2011 FJ_{59}	—	September 15, 2007	Mount Lemmon	Mount Lemmon Survey	LUT	3.0 km	MPC · JPL
762543	2011 FF_{66}	—	January 10, 2007	Mount Lemmon	Mount Lemmon Survey	NYS	750 m	MPC · JPL
762544	2011 FR_{66}	—	February 10, 2011	Mount Lemmon	Mount Lemmon Survey	·	1.5 km	MPC · JPL
762545	2011 FV_{73}	—	March 14, 2011	Mount Lemmon	Mount Lemmon Survey	·	1.2 km	MPC · JPL
762546	2011 FX_{73}	—	February 25, 2011	Kitt Peak	Spacewatch	·	1.0 km	MPC · JPL
762547	2011 FV_{74}	—	March 29, 2011	Mount Lemmon	Mount Lemmon Survey	·	1.6 km	MPC · JPL
762548	2011 FF_{75}	—	March 29, 2011	Mount Lemmon	Mount Lemmon Survey	PHO	670 m	MPC · JPL
762549	2011 FN_{76}	—	March 29, 2011	Mount Lemmon	Mount Lemmon Survey	EOS	1.3 km	MPC · JPL
762550	2011 FR_{79}	—	March 27, 2011	Mount Lemmon	Mount Lemmon Survey	·	990 m	MPC · JPL
762551	2011 FT_{79}	—	March 27, 2011	Mount Lemmon	Mount Lemmon Survey	NYS	1.1 km	MPC · JPL
762552	2011 FN_{81}	—	March 28, 2011	Mount Lemmon	Mount Lemmon Survey	·	720 m	MPC · JPL
762553	2011 FZ_{86}	—	September 25, 2008	Mount Lemmon	Mount Lemmon Survey	T_{j} (2.99) · 3:2	3.6 km	MPC · JPL
762554	2011 FL_{91}	—	March 4, 2011	Kitt Peak	Spacewatch	·	870 m	MPC · JPL
762555	2011 FN_{92}	—	March 28, 2011	Mount Lemmon	Mount Lemmon Survey	·	1 km	MPC · JPL
762556	2011 FY_{93}	—	March 4, 2011	Kitt Peak	Spacewatch	·	1.5 km	MPC · JPL
762557	2011 FT_{94}	—	March 29, 2011	Mount Lemmon	Mount Lemmon Survey	·	760 m	MPC · JPL
762558	2011 FS_{99}	—	March 30, 2011	Mount Lemmon	Mount Lemmon Survey	EOS	1.4 km	MPC · JPL
762559	2011 FG_{100}	—	March 30, 2011	Mount Lemmon	Mount Lemmon Survey	·	840 m	MPC · JPL
762560	2011 FG_{115}	—	April 2, 2011	Mount Lemmon	Mount Lemmon Survey	·	1.9 km	MPC · JPL
762561	2011 FA_{116}	—	April 2, 2011	Mount Lemmon	Mount Lemmon Survey	V	430 m	MPC · JPL
762562	2011 FG_{121}	—	March 14, 2011	Mount Lemmon	Mount Lemmon Survey	KOR	1.1 km	MPC · JPL
762563	2011 FG_{122}	—	March 24, 2006	Kitt Peak	Spacewatch	EOS	1.4 km	MPC · JPL
762564	2011 FP_{130}	—	February 22, 2011	Kitt Peak	Spacewatch	MAS	600 m	MPC · JPL
762565	2011 FG_{133}	—	March 5, 2011	Mount Lemmon	Mount Lemmon Survey	MAS	510 m	MPC · JPL
762566	2011 FR_{134}	—	March 28, 2011	Mount Lemmon	Mount Lemmon Survey	·	1.3 km	MPC · JPL
762567	2011 FZ_{136}	—	March 2, 2011	Kitt Peak	Spacewatch	·	730 m	MPC · JPL
762568	2011 FR_{138}	—	March 2, 2011	Kitt Peak	Spacewatch	URS	2.3 km	MPC · JPL
762569	2011 FY_{143}	—	March 30, 2011	Mount Lemmon	Mount Lemmon Survey	NYS	780 m	MPC · JPL
762570	2011 FW_{158}	—	April 26, 2017	Haleakala	Pan-STARRS 1	HYG	2.0 km	MPC · JPL
762571	2011 FL_{160}	—	March 27, 2011	Mount Lemmon	Mount Lemmon Survey	·	1.8 km	MPC · JPL
762572	2011 FA_{161}	—	July 30, 2016	Haleakala	Pan-STARRS 1	·	940 m	MPC · JPL
762573	2011 FT_{161}	—	March 27, 2011	Mount Lemmon	Mount Lemmon Survey	·	2.4 km	MPC · JPL
762574	2011 FU_{161}	—	March 29, 2011	Mount Lemmon	Mount Lemmon Survey	·	1.1 km	MPC · JPL
762575	2011 FY_{161}	—	March 30, 2011	Mount Lemmon	Mount Lemmon Survey	·	2.2 km	MPC · JPL
762576	2011 FT_{163}	—	April 25, 2017	Haleakala	Pan-STARRS 1	·	2.0 km	MPC · JPL
762577	2011 FH_{164}	—	February 28, 2016	Mount Lemmon	Mount Lemmon Survey	·	2.0 km	MPC · JPL
762578	2011 FN_{164}	—	November 16, 2014	Mount Lemmon	Mount Lemmon Survey	·	2.1 km	MPC · JPL
762579	2011 FW_{164}	—	December 28, 2014	Mount Lemmon	Mount Lemmon Survey	·	1.8 km	MPC · JPL
762580	2011 FJ_{166}	—	March 29, 2011	Mount Lemmon	Mount Lemmon Survey	·	1.5 km	MPC · JPL
762581	2011 FX_{166}	—	April 23, 2015	Haleakala	Pan-STARRS 1	·	830 m	MPC · JPL
762582	2011 FY_{166}	—	September 1, 2013	Mount Lemmon	Mount Lemmon Survey	·	1.8 km	MPC · JPL
762583	2011 FD_{167}	—	January 12, 2018	Mount Lemmon	Mount Lemmon Survey	·	800 m	MPC · JPL
762584	2011 FO_{167}	—	August 5, 2018	Haleakala	Pan-STARRS 1	·	2.4 km	MPC · JPL
762585	2011 FW_{167}	—	March 27, 2011	Kitt Peak	Spacewatch	·	810 m	MPC · JPL
762586	2011 FX_{167}	—	March 29, 2011	Catalina	CSS	·	1.8 km	MPC · JPL
762587	2011 FP_{168}	—	March 29, 2011	Kitt Peak	Spacewatch	THM	1.9 km	MPC · JPL
762588	2011 FR_{168}	—	March 26, 2011	Mount Lemmon	Mount Lemmon Survey	·	2.1 km	MPC · JPL
762589	2011 FP_{169}	—	March 28, 2011	Mount Lemmon	Mount Lemmon Survey	·	3.0 km	MPC · JPL
762590	2011 FN_{172}	—	March 30, 2011	Haleakala	Pan-STARRS 1	·	730 m	MPC · JPL
762591	2011 GA_{5}	—	April 1, 2011	Mount Lemmon	Mount Lemmon Survey	PHO	710 m	MPC · JPL
762592	2011 GJ_{7}	—	April 2, 2011	Mount Lemmon	Mount Lemmon Survey	·	1.2 km	MPC · JPL
762593	2011 GA_{10}	—	November 11, 2009	Kitt Peak	Spacewatch	·	1.3 km	MPC · JPL
762594	2011 GG_{10}	—	October 6, 2008	Kitt Peak	Spacewatch	VER	2.0 km	MPC · JPL
762595	2011 GG_{12}	—	March 25, 2011	Kitt Peak	Spacewatch	NYS	850 m	MPC · JPL
762596	2011 GT_{12}	—	March 11, 2011	Mount Lemmon	Mount Lemmon Survey	NYS	680 m	MPC · JPL
762597	2011 GL_{18}	—	April 2, 2011	Mount Lemmon	Mount Lemmon Survey	·	1.5 km	MPC · JPL
762598	2011 GD_{20}	—	March 11, 2011	Mount Lemmon	Mount Lemmon Survey	·	1.5 km	MPC · JPL
762599	2011 GK_{21}	—	April 2, 2011	Mount Lemmon	Mount Lemmon Survey	·	2.1 km	MPC · JPL
762600	2011 GH_{27}	—	April 2, 2011	Mount Lemmon	Mount Lemmon Survey	·	2.1 km	MPC · JPL

== 762601–762700 ==
back to top

Designation			Discovery			Properties		Ref
Permanent	Provisional	Named after	Date	Site	Discoverer(s)	Category	Diam.	Ref
762601	2011 GG_{34}	—	March 11, 2011	Mount Lemmon	Mount Lemmon Survey	NYS	690 m	MPC · JPL
762602	2011 GM_{34}	—	April 3, 2011	Haleakala	Pan-STARRS 1	MAS	590 m	MPC · JPL
762603	2011 GU_{35}	—	April 3, 2011	Nogales	Abe, S.	·	910 m	MPC · JPL
762604	2011 GJ_{36}	—	May 21, 2006	Kitt Peak	Spacewatch	·	2.3 km	MPC · JPL
762605	2011 GD_{41}	—	April 5, 2011	Mount Lemmon	Mount Lemmon Survey	·	1.6 km	MPC · JPL
762606	2011 GW_{41}	—	April 5, 2011	Catalina	CSS	·	3.0 km	MPC · JPL
762607	2011 GY_{42}	—	March 6, 2011	Mount Lemmon	Mount Lemmon Survey	·	2.0 km	MPC · JPL
762608	2011 GA_{48}	—	January 9, 2007	Kitt Peak	Spacewatch	NYS	800 m	MPC · JPL
762609	2011 GU_{48}	—	April 3, 2011	Haleakala	Pan-STARRS 1	·	490 m	MPC · JPL
762610	2011 GB_{50}	—	April 25, 2004	Kitt Peak	Spacewatch	·	750 m	MPC · JPL
762611	2011 GO_{50}	—	March 11, 2011	Kitt Peak	Spacewatch	·	930 m	MPC · JPL
762612	2011 GJ_{51}	—	April 5, 2011	Mount Lemmon	Mount Lemmon Survey	EOS	1.5 km	MPC · JPL
762613	2011 GP_{52}	—	April 5, 2011	Mount Lemmon	Mount Lemmon Survey	·	2.0 km	MPC · JPL
762614	2011 GN_{68}	—	April 2, 2011	Mount Lemmon	Mount Lemmon Survey	·	2.3 km	MPC · JPL
762615	2011 GG_{74}	—	April 13, 2011	Mount Lemmon	Mount Lemmon Survey	·	2.9 km	MPC · JPL
762616	2011 GL_{75}	—	March 27, 2011	Mount Lemmon	Mount Lemmon Survey	·	950 m	MPC · JPL
762617	2011 GD_{78}	—	April 5, 2011	Catalina	CSS	·	2.4 km	MPC · JPL
762618	2011 GX_{78}	—	April 13, 2011	Mount Lemmon	Mount Lemmon Survey	·	2.7 km	MPC · JPL
762619	2011 GF_{80}	—	September 23, 2008	Kitt Peak	Spacewatch	EOS	1.4 km	MPC · JPL
762620	2011 GF_{83}	—	March 27, 2011	Mount Lemmon	Mount Lemmon Survey	·	860 m	MPC · JPL
762621	2011 GL_{83}	—	January 24, 2007	Kitt Peak	Spacewatch	·	880 m	MPC · JPL
762622	2011 GR_{83}	—	April 14, 2011	Mount Lemmon	Mount Lemmon Survey	·	2.1 km	MPC · JPL
762623	2011 GE_{85}	—	September 10, 2007	Mount Lemmon	Mount Lemmon Survey	·	2.1 km	MPC · JPL
762624	2011 GB_{87}	—	January 24, 2007	Mount Lemmon	Mount Lemmon Survey	MAS	590 m	MPC · JPL
762625	2011 GZ_{91}	—	April 6, 2017	Haleakala	Pan-STARRS 1	LIX	2.8 km	MPC · JPL
762626	2011 GT_{92}	—	October 3, 2013	Haleakala	Pan-STARRS 1	·	1.5 km	MPC · JPL
762627	2011 GJ_{93}	—	November 22, 2014	Haleakala	Pan-STARRS 1	EOS	1.2 km	MPC · JPL
762628	2011 GN_{93}	—	August 31, 2014	Haleakala	Pan-STARRS 1	·	2.3 km	MPC · JPL
762629	2011 GR_{93}	—	April 18, 2015	Haleakala	Pan-STARRS 1	·	960 m	MPC · JPL
762630	2011 GC_{94}	—	April 1, 2011	Mount Lemmon	Mount Lemmon Survey	·	910 m	MPC · JPL
762631	2011 GE_{94}	—	October 16, 2012	Mount Lemmon	Mount Lemmon Survey	MAS	640 m	MPC · JPL
762632	2011 GA_{95}	—	April 1, 2011	Mount Lemmon	Mount Lemmon Survey	·	2.3 km	MPC · JPL
762633	2011 GR_{95}	—	April 12, 2011	Mount Lemmon	Mount Lemmon Survey	PHO	670 m	MPC · JPL
762634	2011 GW_{95}	—	November 30, 2014	Haleakala	Pan-STARRS 1	·	2.0 km	MPC · JPL
762635	2011 GY_{95}	—	September 3, 2013	Mount Lemmon	Mount Lemmon Survey	·	2.1 km	MPC · JPL
762636	2011 GA_{96}	—	April 26, 2017	Haleakala	Pan-STARRS 1	·	2.4 km	MPC · JPL
762637	2011 GJ_{96}	—	July 16, 2013	Haleakala	Pan-STARRS 1	·	2.6 km	MPC · JPL
762638	2011 GL_{96}	—	May 8, 2006	Mount Lemmon	Mount Lemmon Survey	LIX	3.2 km	MPC · JPL
762639	2011 GV_{96}	—	June 15, 2015	Haleakala	Pan-STARRS 1	V	430 m	MPC · JPL
762640	2011 GO_{97}	—	September 1, 2013	Haleakala	Pan-STARRS 1	·	1.8 km	MPC · JPL
762641	2011 GR_{98}	—	October 24, 2013	Mount Lemmon	Mount Lemmon Survey	·	2.7 km	MPC · JPL
762642	2011 GH_{99}	—	July 11, 2018	Haleakala	Pan-STARRS 1	·	2.2 km	MPC · JPL
762643	2011 GO_{99}	—	April 3, 2011	Haleakala	Pan-STARRS 1	EOS	1.3 km	MPC · JPL
762644	2011 GQ_{100}	—	April 12, 2011	Mount Lemmon	Mount Lemmon Survey	·	2.4 km	MPC · JPL
762645	2011 GU_{100}	—	April 3, 2011	Haleakala	Pan-STARRS 1	HOF	2.1 km	MPC · JPL
762646	2011 GF_{102}	—	April 3, 2011	Haleakala	Pan-STARRS 1	·	2.3 km	MPC · JPL
762647	2011 GK_{104}	—	April 6, 2011	Mount Lemmon	Mount Lemmon Survey	·	1.5 km	MPC · JPL
762648	2011 GL_{104}	—	April 12, 2011	Mount Lemmon	Mount Lemmon Survey	·	2.3 km	MPC · JPL
762649	2011 GP_{104}	—	April 12, 2011	Mount Lemmon	Mount Lemmon Survey	·	1.6 km	MPC · JPL
762650	2011 GF_{105}	—	April 11, 2011	Mount Lemmon	Mount Lemmon Survey	·	2.6 km	MPC · JPL
762651	2011 GN_{106}	—	April 2, 2011	Kitt Peak	Spacewatch	·	2.1 km	MPC · JPL
762652	2011 GR_{106}	—	April 5, 2011	Mount Lemmon	Mount Lemmon Survey	·	2.3 km	MPC · JPL
762653	2011 GS_{106}	—	April 7, 2011	Kitt Peak	Spacewatch	·	1.6 km	MPC · JPL
762654	2011 GH_{107}	—	April 3, 2011	Haleakala	Pan-STARRS 1	·	1.6 km	MPC · JPL
762655	2011 GO_{107}	—	April 6, 2011	Mount Lemmon	Mount Lemmon Survey	·	2.0 km	MPC · JPL
762656	2011 GP_{109}	—	April 3, 2011	Haleakala	Pan-STARRS 1	·	1.9 km	MPC · JPL
762657	2011 GJ_{111}	—	April 2, 2011	Kitt Peak	Spacewatch	·	2.1 km	MPC · JPL
762658	2011 HX_{11}	—	April 22, 2011	Kitt Peak	Spacewatch	BRA	1.3 km	MPC · JPL
762659	2011 HJ_{13}	—	April 23, 2011	Haleakala	Pan-STARRS 1	PHO	880 m	MPC · JPL
762660	2011 HS_{15}	—	April 24, 2011	Mount Lemmon	Mount Lemmon Survey	·	1.6 km	MPC · JPL
762661	2011 HM_{16}	—	April 24, 2011	Mount Lemmon	Mount Lemmon Survey	·	2.0 km	MPC · JPL
762662	2011 HR_{17}	—	April 22, 2011	Kitt Peak	Spacewatch	MAS	580 m	MPC · JPL
762663	2011 HJ_{20}	—	March 30, 2011	Mount Lemmon	Mount Lemmon Survey	·	800 m	MPC · JPL
762664	2011 HP_{32}	—	April 7, 2011	Kitt Peak	Spacewatch	·	1.0 km	MPC · JPL
762665	2011 HV_{35}	—	April 28, 2011	Kitt Peak	Spacewatch	·	490 m	MPC · JPL
762666	2011 HE_{38}	—	April 27, 2011	Haleakala	Pan-STARRS 1	·	810 m	MPC · JPL
762667	2011 HL_{40}	—	April 26, 2011	Mount Lemmon	Mount Lemmon Survey	·	2.2 km	MPC · JPL
762668	2011 HS_{40}	—	April 26, 2011	Mount Lemmon	Mount Lemmon Survey	·	1 km	MPC · JPL
762669	2011 HD_{43}	—	April 27, 2011	Mount Lemmon	Mount Lemmon Survey	·	2.2 km	MPC · JPL
762670	2011 HK_{50}	—	April 30, 2011	Kitt Peak	Spacewatch	·	2.1 km	MPC · JPL
762671	2011 HX_{50}	—	April 30, 2011	Kitt Peak	Spacewatch	·	1.6 km	MPC · JPL
762672	2011 HR_{52}	—	April 30, 2011	Haleakala	Pan-STARRS 1	·	1.7 km	MPC · JPL
762673	2011 HM_{55}	—	April 6, 2011	Mount Lemmon	Mount Lemmon Survey	LIX	2.9 km	MPC · JPL
762674	2011 HZ_{63}	—	March 26, 2006	Kitt Peak	Spacewatch	·	1.4 km	MPC · JPL
762675	2011 HM_{64}	—	April 1, 2011	Kitt Peak	Spacewatch	·	740 m	MPC · JPL
762676	2011 HR_{65}	—	April 6, 2011	Mount Lemmon	Mount Lemmon Survey	V	550 m	MPC · JPL
762677	2011 HC_{68}	—	April 2, 2011	Kitt Peak	Spacewatch	·	2.0 km	MPC · JPL
762678	2011 HW_{69}	—	April 24, 2011	Mount Lemmon	Mount Lemmon Survey	·	1.9 km	MPC · JPL
762679	2011 HM_{78}	—	April 12, 2011	Catalina	CSS	PHO	800 m	MPC · JPL
762680	2011 HC_{79}	—	April 2, 2011	Kitt Peak	Spacewatch	·	750 m	MPC · JPL
762681	2011 HU_{87}	—	April 24, 2011	Kitt Peak	Spacewatch	EOS	1.4 km	MPC · JPL
762682	2011 HE_{88}	—	September 13, 2007	Kitt Peak	Spacewatch	THM	1.7 km	MPC · JPL
762683	2011 HV_{90}	—	April 22, 2011	Kitt Peak	Spacewatch	PHO	720 m	MPC · JPL
762684	2011 HG_{92}	—	April 23, 2011	Haleakala	Pan-STARRS 1	·	920 m	MPC · JPL
762685	2011 HM_{93}	—	April 26, 2011	Mount Lemmon	Mount Lemmon Survey	·	2.4 km	MPC · JPL
762686	2011 HV_{94}	—	April 27, 2011	Kitt Peak	Spacewatch	·	2.4 km	MPC · JPL
762687	2011 HB_{99}	—	November 3, 2007	Kitt Peak	Spacewatch	·	2.2 km	MPC · JPL
762688	2011 HC_{99}	—	April 30, 2011	Mount Lemmon	Mount Lemmon Survey	THM	1.9 km	MPC · JPL
762689	2011 HP_{105}	—	June 27, 2015	Haleakala	Pan-STARRS 1	·	590 m	MPC · JPL
762690	2011 HV_{105}	—	April 23, 2011	Kitt Peak	Spacewatch	·	2.3 km	MPC · JPL
762691	2011 HX_{105}	—	October 2, 2013	Haleakala	Pan-STARRS 1	·	2.6 km	MPC · JPL
762692	2011 HD_{106}	—	August 2, 2016	Haleakala	Pan-STARRS 1	·	1.0 km	MPC · JPL
762693	2011 HS_{107}	—	February 11, 2016	Haleakala	Pan-STARRS 1	·	2.4 km	MPC · JPL
762694	2011 HU_{107}	—	April 27, 2017	Haleakala	Pan-STARRS 1	·	2.3 km	MPC · JPL
762695	2011 HD_{108}	—	November 12, 2013	Mount Lemmon	Mount Lemmon Survey	NYS	840 m	MPC · JPL
762696	2011 HE_{108}	—	November 9, 2013	Kitt Peak	Spacewatch	EOS	1.5 km	MPC · JPL
762697	2011 HK_{108}	—	March 31, 2016	Haleakala	Pan-STARRS 1	·	1.3 km	MPC · JPL
762698	2011 HN_{108}	—	April 28, 2011	Mount Lemmon	Mount Lemmon Survey	·	940 m	MPC · JPL
762699	2011 HJ_{109}	—	April 13, 2018	Haleakala	Pan-STARRS 1	PHO	630 m	MPC · JPL
762700	2011 HM_{109}	—	April 23, 2011	Haleakala	Pan-STARRS 1	·	2.2 km	MPC · JPL

== 762701–762800 ==
back to top

Designation			Discovery			Properties		Ref
Permanent	Provisional	Named after	Date	Site	Discoverer(s)	Category	Diam.	Ref
762701	2011 HS_{109}	—	April 28, 2011	Kitt Peak	Spacewatch	·	1.0 km	MPC · JPL
762702	2011 HU_{109}	—	April 6, 2011	Mount Lemmon	Mount Lemmon Survey	·	2.6 km	MPC · JPL
762703	2011 HX_{109}	—	April 30, 2011	Kitt Peak	Spacewatch	·	990 m	MPC · JPL
762704	2011 HA_{110}	—	April 29, 2011	Kitt Peak	Spacewatch	·	1.9 km	MPC · JPL
762705	2011 HD_{110}	—	April 26, 2011	Mount Lemmon	Mount Lemmon Survey	·	1.6 km	MPC · JPL
762706	2011 HN_{110}	—	April 30, 2011	Kitt Peak	Spacewatch	·	2.3 km	MPC · JPL
762707	2011 HR_{110}	—	April 29, 2011	Mount Lemmon	Mount Lemmon Survey	NYS	870 m	MPC · JPL
762708	2011 HT_{111}	—	May 4, 2000	Kitt Peak	Spacewatch	LIX	2.8 km	MPC · JPL
762709	2011 HN_{112}	—	April 23, 2011	Haleakala	Pan-STARRS 1	·	1.0 km	MPC · JPL
762710	2011 HO_{112}	—	April 26, 2011	Mount Lemmon	Mount Lemmon Survey	·	3.0 km	MPC · JPL
762711	2011 HH_{113}	—	April 26, 2011	Mount Lemmon	Mount Lemmon Survey	·	1.6 km	MPC · JPL
762712	2011 HR_{114}	—	April 29, 2011	Mount Lemmon	Mount Lemmon Survey	·	2.0 km	MPC · JPL
762713	2011 JO_{1}	—	May 3, 2011	Mount Lemmon	Mount Lemmon Survey	·	1.8 km	MPC · JPL
762714	2011 JX_{3}	—	October 4, 2007	Mount Lemmon	Mount Lemmon Survey	EOS	1.4 km	MPC · JPL
762715	2011 JY_{6}	—	May 26, 2006	Kitt Peak	Spacewatch	·	2.7 km	MPC · JPL
762716	2011 JS_{8}	—	May 1, 2011	Haleakala	Pan-STARRS 1	·	2.4 km	MPC · JPL
762717	2011 JQ_{10}	—	May 6, 2011	Kitt Peak	Spacewatch	·	870 m	MPC · JPL
762718	2011 JY_{13}	—	March 5, 2011	Kitt Peak	Spacewatch	·	1.1 km	MPC · JPL
762719	2011 JQ_{15}	—	May 6, 2011	Kitt Peak	Spacewatch	·	2.6 km	MPC · JPL
762720	2011 JV_{18}	—	May 1, 2011	Haleakala	Pan-STARRS 1	·	2.4 km	MPC · JPL
762721	2011 JP_{19}	—	May 1, 2011	Haleakala	Pan-STARRS 1	EOS	1.5 km	MPC · JPL
762722	2011 JD_{20}	—	February 4, 2005	Wrightwood	J. W. Young	·	1.9 km	MPC · JPL
762723	2011 JC_{34}	—	May 5, 2011	Mount Lemmon	Mount Lemmon Survey	·	1.3 km	MPC · JPL
762724	2011 JO_{34}	—	May 7, 2011	Kitt Peak	Spacewatch	·	900 m	MPC · JPL
762725	2011 JR_{34}	—	January 28, 2015	Haleakala	Pan-STARRS 1	·	2.1 km	MPC · JPL
762726	2011 JT_{34}	—	December 28, 2014	Mount Lemmon	Mount Lemmon Survey	·	1.7 km	MPC · JPL
762727	2011 JT_{35}	—	July 11, 2018	Haleakala	Pan-STARRS 1	·	2.5 km	MPC · JPL
762728	2011 JG_{36}	—	May 1, 2011	Haleakala	Pan-STARRS 1	·	1.0 km	MPC · JPL
762729	2011 JL_{36}	—	May 1, 2011	Haleakala	Pan-STARRS 1	EOS	1.4 km	MPC · JPL
762730	2011 JO_{36}	—	March 10, 2016	Haleakala	Pan-STARRS 1	·	2.5 km	MPC · JPL
762731	2011 JE_{37}	—	May 9, 2011	Mount Lemmon	Mount Lemmon Survey	·	2.3 km	MPC · JPL
762732	2011 JK_{37}	—	May 1, 2011	Haleakala	Pan-STARRS 1	T_{j} (2.99) · 3:2	4.7 km	MPC · JPL
762733	2011 JS_{37}	—	May 13, 2011	Mount Lemmon	Mount Lemmon Survey	NYS	890 m	MPC · JPL
762734	2011 JZ_{37}	—	May 8, 2011	Kitt Peak	Spacewatch	·	2.1 km	MPC · JPL
762735	2011 JA_{38}	—	May 1, 2011	Haleakala	Pan-STARRS 1	·	1.6 km	MPC · JPL
762736	2011 JB_{38}	—	May 1, 2011	Haleakala	Pan-STARRS 1	·	2.1 km	MPC · JPL
762737	2011 JF_{38}	—	May 13, 2011	Mount Lemmon	Mount Lemmon Survey	·	1.5 km	MPC · JPL
762738	2011 JC_{39}	—	May 9, 2011	Mount Lemmon	Mount Lemmon Survey	·	2.2 km	MPC · JPL
762739	2011 JB_{40}	—	May 13, 2011	Mount Lemmon	Mount Lemmon Survey	·	2.3 km	MPC · JPL
762740	2011 JK_{40}	—	May 7, 2011	Kitt Peak	Spacewatch	·	2.5 km	MPC · JPL
762741	2011 KF_{17}	—	May 29, 2011	Črni Vrh	Mikuž, B.	·	2.4 km	MPC · JPL
762742	2011 KF_{18}	—	May 24, 2011	Haleakala	Pan-STARRS 1	NYS	920 m	MPC · JPL
762743	2011 KL_{27}	—	March 31, 2011	Mount Lemmon	Mount Lemmon Survey	·	2.5 km	MPC · JPL
762744	2011 KX_{31}	—	May 27, 2011	Catalina	CSS	·	3.0 km	MPC · JPL
762745	2011 KC_{38}	—	May 22, 2011	Mount Lemmon	Mount Lemmon Survey	·	1.5 km	MPC · JPL
762746	2011 KR_{39}	—	May 24, 2011	Haleakala	Pan-STARRS 1	·	620 m	MPC · JPL
762747	2011 KW_{42}	—	May 3, 2011	Mount Lemmon	Mount Lemmon Survey	THM	1.8 km	MPC · JPL
762748	2011 KY_{42}	—	May 26, 2011	Kitt Peak	Spacewatch	·	790 m	MPC · JPL
762749	2011 KJ_{44}	—	May 27, 2011	Kitt Peak	Spacewatch	·	1.4 km	MPC · JPL
762750	2011 KE_{46}	—	May 30, 2011	Haleakala	Pan-STARRS 1	·	1.9 km	MPC · JPL
762751	2011 KX_{52}	—	May 26, 2011	Mount Lemmon	Mount Lemmon Survey	V	430 m	MPC · JPL
762752	2011 KR_{53}	—	May 21, 2011	Haleakala	Pan-STARRS 1	·	2.5 km	MPC · JPL
762753	2011 KL_{54}	—	May 26, 2011	Mount Lemmon	Mount Lemmon Survey	·	810 m	MPC · JPL
762754	2011 KS_{54}	—	May 21, 2011	Haleakala	Pan-STARRS 1	·	1.0 km	MPC · JPL
762755	2011 KC_{55}	—	February 29, 2016	Haleakala	Pan-STARRS 1	EOS	1.5 km	MPC · JPL
762756	2011 KS_{55}	—	May 23, 2011	Mount Lemmon	Mount Lemmon Survey	·	1.6 km	MPC · JPL
762757	2011 KW_{55}	—	May 30, 2011	Haleakala	Pan-STARRS 1	·	1.0 km	MPC · JPL
762758	2011 KG_{56}	—	May 22, 2011	Mount Lemmon	Mount Lemmon Survey	·	1.2 km	MPC · JPL
762759	2011 KV_{56}	—	October 17, 2007	Mount Lemmon	Mount Lemmon Survey	THM	2.0 km	MPC · JPL
762760	2011 KX_{56}	—	May 28, 2011	Kitt Peak	Spacewatch	·	890 m	MPC · JPL
762761	2011 KL_{57}	—	May 25, 2011	Mount Lemmon	Mount Lemmon Survey	ERI	1.2 km	MPC · JPL
762762	2011 KU_{57}	—	May 30, 2011	Haleakala	Pan-STARRS 1	·	2.2 km	MPC · JPL
762763	2011 KX_{57}	—	May 22, 2011	Mount Lemmon	Mount Lemmon Survey	·	2.4 km	MPC · JPL
762764	2011 KX_{58}	—	May 27, 2011	Kitt Peak	Spacewatch	·	2.5 km	MPC · JPL
762765	2011 KY_{58}	—	May 31, 2011	Mount Lemmon	Mount Lemmon Survey	·	2.0 km	MPC · JPL
762766	2011 KD_{60}	—	April 10, 2005	Mount Lemmon	Mount Lemmon Survey	THM	1.9 km	MPC · JPL
762767	2011 LA_{2}	—	June 3, 2011	Mount Lemmon	Mount Lemmon Survey	·	2.3 km	MPC · JPL
762768	2011 LC_{2}	—	June 3, 2011	Mount Lemmon	Mount Lemmon Survey	·	2.5 km	MPC · JPL
762769	2011 LC_{4}	—	June 4, 2011	Mount Lemmon	Mount Lemmon Survey	·	1.5 km	MPC · JPL
762770	2011 LJ_{4}	—	March 26, 2007	Mount Lemmon	Mount Lemmon Survey	·	990 m	MPC · JPL
762771	2011 LR_{10}	—	June 6, 2011	Mount Lemmon	Mount Lemmon Survey	H	440 m	MPC · JPL
762772	2011 LQ_{11}	—	May 21, 2011	Haleakala	Pan-STARRS 1	·	2.9 km	MPC · JPL
762773	2011 LH_{13}	—	March 26, 2007	Kitt Peak	Spacewatch	MAS	610 m	MPC · JPL
762774	2011 LU_{14}	—	May 21, 2011	Mount Lemmon	Mount Lemmon Survey	·	1.9 km	MPC · JPL
762775	2011 LC_{22}	—	June 3, 2011	Mount Lemmon	Mount Lemmon Survey	·	1.8 km	MPC · JPL
762776	2011 LD_{22}	—	June 3, 2011	Mount Lemmon	Mount Lemmon Survey	·	1.1 km	MPC · JPL
762777	2011 LF_{22}	—	June 3, 2011	Mount Lemmon	Mount Lemmon Survey	HYG	1.9 km	MPC · JPL
762778	2011 LG_{24}	—	February 15, 2007	Junk Bond	D. Healy	NYS	850 m	MPC · JPL
762779	2011 LL_{26}	—	April 29, 2011	Mount Lemmon	Mount Lemmon Survey	TIR	1.9 km	MPC · JPL
762780	2011 LL_{29}	—	December 13, 2012	Kitt Peak	Spacewatch	EUP	2.8 km	MPC · JPL
762781	2011 LH_{30}	—	September 15, 2012	Mount Lemmon	Mount Lemmon Survey	·	1.1 km	MPC · JPL
762782	2011 LN_{30}	—	April 11, 2016	Haleakala	Pan-STARRS 1	·	1.6 km	MPC · JPL
762783	2011 LO_{30}	—	January 5, 2014	Haleakala	Pan-STARRS 1	·	890 m	MPC · JPL
762784	2011 LW_{30}	—	January 14, 2015	Haleakala	Pan-STARRS 1	·	1.8 km	MPC · JPL
762785	2011 LN_{31}	—	June 12, 2011	Haleakala	Pan-STARRS 1	JUN	650 m	MPC · JPL
762786	2011 LJ_{32}	—	October 21, 2012	Kitt Peak	Spacewatch	·	690 m	MPC · JPL
762787	2011 LS_{32}	—	May 30, 2016	Haleakala	Pan-STARRS 1	·	1.8 km	MPC · JPL
762788	2011 LL_{33}	—	June 4, 2011	Mount Lemmon	Mount Lemmon Survey	·	890 m	MPC · JPL
762789	2011 LM_{33}	—	January 15, 2015	Haleakala	Pan-STARRS 1	·	2.5 km	MPC · JPL
762790	2011 LE_{36}	—	June 2, 2011	Haleakala	Pan-STARRS 1	·	2.8 km	MPC · JPL
762791	2011 LJ_{36}	—	June 3, 2011	Mount Lemmon	Mount Lemmon Survey	·	2.4 km	MPC · JPL
762792	2011 LL_{36}	—	June 2, 2011	Haleakala	Pan-STARRS 1	·	2.0 km	MPC · JPL
762793	2011 MJ_{3}	—	September 30, 2005	Mount Lemmon	Mount Lemmon Survey	·	530 m	MPC · JPL
762794	2011 MH_{7}	—	June 4, 2011	Mount Lemmon	Mount Lemmon Survey	·	1.1 km	MPC · JPL
762795	2011 MD_{8}	—	June 3, 2011	Mount Lemmon	Mount Lemmon Survey	PHO	900 m	MPC · JPL
762796	2011 MT_{13}	—	June 27, 2011	Kitt Peak	Spacewatch	·	1.3 km	MPC · JPL
762797	2011 MM_{14}	—	September 18, 2011	Mount Lemmon	Mount Lemmon Survey	·	2.8 km	MPC · JPL
762798	2011 NB_{5}	—	July 1, 2011	Mount Lemmon	Mount Lemmon Survey	T_{j} (2.97)	3.0 km	MPC · JPL
762799	2011 NQ_{6}	—	July 2, 2011	Mount Lemmon	Mount Lemmon Survey	EUN	990 m	MPC · JPL
762800	2011 OL_{9}	—	July 27, 2011	Haleakala	Pan-STARRS 1	L5	5.8 km	MPC · JPL

== 762801–762900 ==
back to top

Designation			Discovery			Properties		Ref
Permanent	Provisional	Named after	Date	Site	Discoverer(s)	Category	Diam.	Ref
762801	2011 OP_{11}	—	July 25, 2011	Haleakala	Pan-STARRS 1	·	2.5 km	MPC · JPL
762802	2011 OP_{12}	—	July 25, 2011	Haleakala	Pan-STARRS 1	·	1.2 km	MPC · JPL
762803	2011 OV_{13}	—	July 25, 2011	Haleakala	Pan-STARRS 1	·	960 m	MPC · JPL
762804	2011 OP_{16}	—	July 26, 2011	Haleakala	Pan-STARRS 1	EOS	1.4 km	MPC · JPL
762805	2011 OA_{26}	—	September 28, 2003	Apache Point	SDSS	·	1.1 km	MPC · JPL
762806	2011 OH_{27}	—	June 13, 2007	Kitt Peak	Spacewatch	·	1.2 km	MPC · JPL
762807	2011 OS_{33}	—	July 28, 2011	Haleakala	Pan-STARRS 1	RAF	700 m	MPC · JPL
762808	2011 OD_{37}	—	November 8, 2007	Mount Lemmon	Mount Lemmon Survey	·	2.5 km	MPC · JPL
762809	2011 ON_{38}	—	July 28, 2011	Haleakala	Pan-STARRS 1	EOS	1.5 km	MPC · JPL
762810	2011 OS_{40}	—	July 26, 2011	Haleakala	Pan-STARRS 1	·	930 m	MPC · JPL
762811	2011 OT_{48}	—	July 28, 2011	Haleakala	Pan-STARRS 1	·	1.0 km	MPC · JPL
762812	2011 OF_{54}	—	December 22, 2008	Kitt Peak	Spacewatch	(5)	950 m	MPC · JPL
762813	2011 OT_{55}	—	July 27, 2011	Haleakala	Pan-STARRS 1	NYS	910 m	MPC · JPL
762814	2011 OT_{62}	—	June 8, 2016	Haleakala	Pan-STARRS 1	·	1.3 km	MPC · JPL
762815	2011 OY_{62}	—	September 23, 2015	Haleakala	Pan-STARRS 1	·	980 m	MPC · JPL
762816	2011 OZ_{62}	—	September 18, 2012	Mount Lemmon	Mount Lemmon Survey	·	2.9 km	MPC · JPL
762817	2011 OA_{63}	—	December 8, 2012	Mount Lemmon	Mount Lemmon Survey	·	2.4 km	MPC · JPL
762818	2011 OX_{63}	—	February 27, 2015	Haleakala	Pan-STARRS 1	·	2.6 km	MPC · JPL
762819	2011 OG_{64}	—	August 2, 2011	Haleakala	Pan-STARRS 1	·	3.1 km	MPC · JPL
762820	2011 OV_{67}	—	November 28, 2013	Mount Lemmon	Mount Lemmon Survey	·	2.0 km	MPC · JPL
762821	2011 OV_{68}	—	July 28, 2011	Haleakala	Pan-STARRS 1	VER	2.1 km	MPC · JPL
762822	2011 OF_{69}	—	December 4, 2013	Haleakala	Pan-STARRS 1	·	2.0 km	MPC · JPL
762823	2011 OB_{70}	—	July 26, 2011	Haleakala	Pan-STARRS 1	·	1.9 km	MPC · JPL
762824	2011 OQ_{71}	—	July 31, 2011	Haleakala	Pan-STARRS 1	·	3.2 km	MPC · JPL
762825	2011 OZ_{71}	—	July 28, 2011	Haleakala	Pan-STARRS 1	L5	6.2 km	MPC · JPL
762826	2011 OC_{73}	—	July 28, 2011	Haleakala	Pan-STARRS 1	EOS	1.3 km	MPC · JPL
762827	2011 OK_{75}	—	July 28, 2011	Haleakala	Pan-STARRS 1	L5	5.0 km	MPC · JPL
762828	2011 OY_{76}	—	July 28, 2011	Haleakala	Pan-STARRS 1	·	2.5 km	MPC · JPL
762829	2011 OT_{77}	—	July 28, 2011	Haleakala	Pan-STARRS 1	L5	7.2 km	MPC · JPL
762830	2011 PF_{1}	—	August 2, 2011	Dauban	C. Rinner, Kugel, F.	·	2.5 km	MPC · JPL
762831	2011 PL_{18}	—	August 2, 2011	Haleakala	Pan-STARRS 1	·	2.1 km	MPC · JPL
762832	2011 PJ_{19}	—	August 1, 2011	Haleakala	Pan-STARRS 1	KON	1.5 km	MPC · JPL
762833	2011 PG_{20}	—	January 31, 2017	Mount Lemmon	Mount Lemmon Survey	L5	6.2 km	MPC · JPL
762834	2011 PQ_{21}	—	August 6, 2011	Haleakala	Pan-STARRS 1	·	2.3 km	MPC · JPL
762835	2011 PE_{24}	—	May 21, 2014	Haleakala	Pan-STARRS 1	·	1.1 km	MPC · JPL
762836	2011 QJ	—	August 18, 2011	Haleakala	Pan-STARRS 1	L5	8.6 km	MPC · JPL
762837	2011 QJ_{3}	—	August 2, 2011	Haleakala	Pan-STARRS 1	L5	6.9 km	MPC · JPL
762838	2011 QZ_{3}	—	August 21, 2011	Haleakala	Pan-STARRS 1	·	2.4 km	MPC · JPL
762839	2011 QC_{9}	—	October 10, 2007	Catalina	CSS	EUN	870 m	MPC · JPL
762840	2011 QC_{25}	—	August 20, 2011	Haleakala	Pan-STARRS 1	·	1.1 km	MPC · JPL
762841	2011 QT_{25}	—	August 20, 2011	Haleakala	Pan-STARRS 1	·	1.2 km	MPC · JPL
762842	2011 QD_{39}	—	January 16, 2004	Kitt Peak	Spacewatch	·	1.1 km	MPC · JPL
762843	2011 QC_{44}	—	August 26, 2011	Haleakala	Pan-STARRS 1	·	1.3 km	MPC · JPL
762844	2011 QB_{48}	—	August 30, 2011	La Sagra	OAM	·	1.3 km	MPC · JPL
762845	2011 QK_{48}	—	August 20, 2011	Haleakala	Pan-STARRS 1	·	2.0 km	MPC · JPL
762846	2011 QU_{48}	—	August 24, 2011	Haleakala	Pan-STARRS 1	·	1 km	MPC · JPL
762847	2011 QS_{54}	—	August 30, 2011	Haleakala	Pan-STARRS 1	·	1.2 km	MPC · JPL
762848	2011 QQ_{63}	—	July 28, 2011	Haleakala	Pan-STARRS 1	·	1.4 km	MPC · JPL
762849	2011 QL_{73}	—	August 19, 2011	Haleakala	Pan-STARRS 1	·	1.0 km	MPC · JPL
762850	2011 QU_{73}	—	August 20, 2011	Haleakala	Pan-STARRS 1	·	2.3 km	MPC · JPL
762851	2011 QT_{79}	—	August 23, 2011	Haleakala	Pan-STARRS 1	EUN	820 m	MPC · JPL
762852	2011 QZ_{81}	—	August 24, 2011	Haleakala	Pan-STARRS 1	·	950 m	MPC · JPL
762853	2011 QK_{87}	—	August 26, 2011	Piszkés-tető	K. Sárneczky, S. Kürti	·	2.6 km	MPC · JPL
762854	2011 QV_{87}	—	August 27, 2011	Haleakala	Pan-STARRS 1	NYS	850 m	MPC · JPL
762855	2011 QB_{100}	—	September 29, 2000	Kitt Peak	Spacewatch	·	1.0 km	MPC · JPL
762856	2011 QU_{102}	—	August 27, 2011	Haleakala	Pan-STARRS 1	·	2.4 km	MPC · JPL
762857	2011 QJ_{103}	—	February 28, 2014	Haleakala	Pan-STARRS 1	·	770 m	MPC · JPL
762858	2011 QK_{105}	—	September 23, 2015	Haleakala	Pan-STARRS 1	·	950 m	MPC · JPL
762859	2011 QW_{105}	—	February 27, 2014	Haleakala	Pan-STARRS 1	·	1.1 km	MPC · JPL
762860	2011 QD_{106}	—	April 13, 2015	Haleakala	Pan-STARRS 1	EOS	1.4 km	MPC · JPL
762861	2011 QH_{106}	—	January 5, 2013	Mount Lemmon	Mount Lemmon Survey	·	2.9 km	MPC · JPL
762862	2011 QX_{107}	—	December 22, 2016	Haleakala	Pan-STARRS 1	MAR	620 m	MPC · JPL
762863	2011 QD_{108}	—	October 9, 2012	Haleakala	Pan-STARRS 1	L5	6.5 km	MPC · JPL
762864	2011 QG_{109}	—	January 22, 2015	Haleakala	Pan-STARRS 1	·	2.2 km	MPC · JPL
762865	2011 QH_{110}	—	August 23, 2011	Haleakala	Pan-STARRS 1	·	810 m	MPC · JPL
762866	2011 QU_{116}	—	August 23, 2011	Haleakala	Pan-STARRS 1	·	1.3 km	MPC · JPL
762867	2011 QT_{117}	—	August 23, 2011	Haleakala	Pan-STARRS 1	L5	7.1 km	MPC · JPL
762868	2011 QJ_{118}	—	August 24, 2011	Haleakala	Pan-STARRS 1	·	2.5 km	MPC · JPL
762869	2011 QT_{119}	—	August 31, 2011	Haleakala	Pan-STARRS 1	L5	6.0 km	MPC · JPL
762870	2011 RS	—	September 4, 2011	Haleakala	Pan-STARRS 1	centaur	109 km	MPC · JPL
762871	2011 RQ_{6}	—	September 5, 2011	Haleakala	Pan-STARRS 1	·	1.7 km	MPC · JPL
762872	2011 RS_{7}	—	September 5, 2011	Haleakala	Pan-STARRS 1	·	1.1 km	MPC · JPL
762873	2011 RV_{10}	—	September 4, 2011	Kitt Peak	Spacewatch	·	2.5 km	MPC · JPL
762874	2011 RL_{14}	—	December 11, 2004	Kitt Peak	Spacewatch	3:2	4.3 km	MPC · JPL
762875	2011 RW_{18}	—	September 8, 2011	Kitt Peak	Spacewatch	(5)	880 m	MPC · JPL
762876	2011 RS_{20}	—	September 2, 2011	Haleakala	Pan-STARRS 1	·	980 m	MPC · JPL
762877	2011 RR_{21}	—	September 7, 2011	Kitt Peak	Spacewatch	·	1.4 km	MPC · JPL
762878	2011 RY_{21}	—	March 18, 2013	Kitt Peak	Spacewatch	·	610 m	MPC · JPL
762879	2011 RS_{24}	—	September 8, 2011	Haleakala	Pan-STARRS 1	·	1.1 km	MPC · JPL
762880	2011 RX_{24}	—	September 8, 2011	Haleakala	Pan-STARRS 1	·	1.3 km	MPC · JPL
762881	2011 RE_{26}	—	February 25, 2014	Haleakala	Pan-STARRS 1	EUN	780 m	MPC · JPL
762882	2011 RZ_{26}	—	September 2, 2011	Haleakala	Pan-STARRS 1	·	2.0 km	MPC · JPL
762883	2011 RR_{30}	—	September 4, 2011	Haleakala	Pan-STARRS 1	·	2.3 km	MPC · JPL
762884	2011 RU_{30}	—	September 4, 2011	Haleakala	Pan-STARRS 1	·	1.3 km	MPC · JPL
762885	2011 RS_{37}	—	October 15, 2007	Kitt Peak	Spacewatch	·	960 m	MPC · JPL
762886	2011 RG_{38}	—	September 4, 2011	Haleakala	Pan-STARRS 1	·	1.7 km	MPC · JPL
762887	2011 RW_{38}	—	September 4, 2011	Haleakala	Pan-STARRS 1	ADE	1.2 km	MPC · JPL
762888	2011 RZ_{38}	—	September 2, 2011	Haleakala	Pan-STARRS 1	·	2.2 km	MPC · JPL
762889	2011 SO	—	August 26, 2011	Kitt Peak	Spacewatch	·	1.9 km	MPC · JPL
762890	2011 SQ_{1}	—	January 15, 2007	Mauna Kea	P. A. Wiegert	·	2.1 km	MPC · JPL
762891	2011 SY_{16}	—	August 30, 2011	Haleakala	Pan-STARRS 1	·	970 m	MPC · JPL
762892	2011 SC_{20}	—	August 31, 2011	Piszkéstető	K. Sárneczky	(1547)	1.0 km	MPC · JPL
762893	2011 SO_{20}	—	September 20, 2011	Haleakala	Pan-STARRS 1	EUN	970 m	MPC · JPL
762894	2011 SK_{22}	—	September 20, 2011	Haleakala	Pan-STARRS 1	L5	6.9 km	MPC · JPL
762895	2011 SV_{22}	—	September 14, 2007	Mount Lemmon	Mount Lemmon Survey	·	850 m	MPC · JPL
762896	2011 SU_{42}	—	September 18, 2011	Mount Lemmon	Mount Lemmon Survey	EOS	1.4 km	MPC · JPL
762897	2011 SE_{44}	—	September 18, 2011	Mount Lemmon	Mount Lemmon Survey	·	2.8 km	MPC · JPL
762898	2011 SU_{44}	—	August 30, 2011	Haleakala	Pan-STARRS 1	V	460 m	MPC · JPL
762899	2011 SX_{46}	—	August 27, 2011	Haleakala	Pan-STARRS 1	·	2.8 km	MPC · JPL
762900	2011 SL_{62}	—	September 21, 2011	Haleakala	Pan-STARRS 1	MAR	950 m	MPC · JPL

== 762901–763000 ==
back to top

Designation			Discovery			Properties		Ref
Permanent	Provisional	Named after	Date	Site	Discoverer(s)	Category	Diam.	Ref
762901	2011 SH_{67}	—	September 23, 2011	SM Montmagastrell	Bosch, J. M.	·	1.1 km	MPC · JPL
762902	2011 SB_{69}	—	September 21, 2011	Catalina	CSS	·	1.2 km	MPC · JPL
762903	2011 SV_{70}	—	September 4, 2011	Haleakala	Pan-STARRS 1	·	1.9 km	MPC · JPL
762904	2011 SO_{81}	—	September 20, 2011	Mount Lemmon	Mount Lemmon Survey	·	1.1 km	MPC · JPL
762905	2011 SV_{85}	—	September 21, 2011	Kitt Peak	Spacewatch	·	1.1 km	MPC · JPL
762906	2011 SN_{88}	—	November 6, 2007	Kitt Peak	Spacewatch	·	900 m	MPC · JPL
762907	2011 SZ_{95}	—	November 20, 2007	Mount Lemmon	Mount Lemmon Survey	·	800 m	MPC · JPL
762908	2011 SN_{104}	—	December 25, 2005	Kitt Peak	Spacewatch	·	500 m	MPC · JPL
762909	2011 SH_{106}	—	October 29, 2008	Kitt Peak	Spacewatch	·	460 m	MPC · JPL
762910	2011 SE_{109}	—	August 27, 2011	Haleakala	Pan-STARRS 1	MAS	470 m	MPC · JPL
762911	2011 SC_{120}	—	September 26, 2011	Mayhill	Sato, H.	·	1.2 km	MPC · JPL
762912	2011 SC_{124}	—	September 10, 2007	Mount Lemmon	Mount Lemmon Survey	·	910 m	MPC · JPL
762913	2011 SY_{129}	—	March 21, 2001	Kitt Peak	Spacewatch	EUN	910 m	MPC · JPL
762914	2011 SR_{132}	—	October 9, 2007	Kitt Peak	Spacewatch	EUN	970 m	MPC · JPL
762915	2011 SD_{140}	—	September 23, 2011	Haleakala	Pan-STARRS 1	·	1.9 km	MPC · JPL
762916	2011 SL_{141}	—	October 16, 2006	Kitt Peak	Spacewatch	·	1.4 km	MPC · JPL
762917	2011 SR_{149}	—	September 26, 2011	Haleakala	Pan-STARRS 1	·	1.2 km	MPC · JPL
762918	2011 SG_{150}	—	September 8, 2011	Kitt Peak	Spacewatch	·	990 m	MPC · JPL
762919	2011 SO_{156}	—	September 26, 2011	Haleakala	Pan-STARRS 1	·	2.8 km	MPC · JPL
762920	2011 ST_{156}	—	September 8, 2011	Kitt Peak	Spacewatch	·	990 m	MPC · JPL
762921	2011 SE_{159}	—	September 23, 2011	Kitt Peak	Spacewatch	·	1.9 km	MPC · JPL
762922	2011 SZ_{160}	—	September 23, 2011	Kitt Peak	Spacewatch	·	1.1 km	MPC · JPL
762923	2011 SS_{161}	—	November 19, 2007	Mount Lemmon	Mount Lemmon Survey	·	1.1 km	MPC · JPL
762924	2011 SW_{168}	—	September 21, 2011	Kitt Peak	Spacewatch	·	1.1 km	MPC · JPL
762925	2011 SM_{171}	—	September 28, 2011	Mount Lemmon	Mount Lemmon Survey	·	850 m	MPC · JPL
762926	2011 SY_{171}	—	September 28, 2011	Mount Lemmon	Mount Lemmon Survey	·	970 m	MPC · JPL
762927	2011 SB_{176}	—	September 21, 2011	Catalina	CSS	·	1.0 km	MPC · JPL
762928	2011 SK_{185}	—	September 26, 2011	Kitt Peak	Spacewatch	·	1.1 km	MPC · JPL
762929	2011 SP_{185}	—	September 26, 2011	Kitt Peak	Spacewatch	·	2.0 km	MPC · JPL
762930	2011 SA_{186}	—	September 28, 2011	Mount Lemmon	Mount Lemmon Survey	MAR	670 m	MPC · JPL
762931	2011 SO_{186}	—	September 29, 2011	Kitt Peak	Spacewatch	AGN	880 m	MPC · JPL
762932	2011 SW_{188}	—	September 22, 2011	Kitt Peak	Spacewatch	·	1.4 km	MPC · JPL
762933	2011 SM_{198}	—	October 15, 2007	Mount Lemmon	Mount Lemmon Survey	·	1.0 km	MPC · JPL
762934	2011 SZ_{198}	—	August 27, 2011	Haleakala	Pan-STARRS 1	(5)	890 m	MPC · JPL
762935	2011 SK_{203}	—	September 19, 2011	Haleakala	Pan-STARRS 1	·	1 km	MPC · JPL
762936	2011 SZ_{209}	—	October 8, 2007	Mount Lemmon	Mount Lemmon Survey	·	810 m	MPC · JPL
762937	2011 SL_{216}	—	September 20, 2011	Haleakala	Pan-STARRS 1	·	860 m	MPC · JPL
762938	2011 SW_{225}	—	September 29, 2011	Mount Lemmon	Mount Lemmon Survey	·	1.3 km	MPC · JPL
762939	2011 ST_{226}	—	September 29, 2011	Mount Lemmon	Mount Lemmon Survey	·	1.2 km	MPC · JPL
762940	2011 SU_{228}	—	September 29, 2011	Mount Lemmon	Mount Lemmon Survey	EUN	710 m	MPC · JPL
762941	2011 SZ_{231}	—	September 22, 2011	Kitt Peak	Spacewatch	·	1.0 km	MPC · JPL
762942	2011 SY_{233}	—	September 9, 2011	Haleakala	Pan-STARRS 1	EOS	1.4 km	MPC · JPL
762943	2011 SL_{236}	—	September 28, 1994	Kitt Peak	Spacewatch	·	1.0 km	MPC · JPL
762944	2011 SG_{239}	—	September 26, 2011	Mount Lemmon	Mount Lemmon Survey	·	1.4 km	MPC · JPL
762945	2011 SK_{239}	—	September 26, 2011	Mount Lemmon	Mount Lemmon Survey	·	2.6 km	MPC · JPL
762946	2011 SC_{240}	—	September 26, 2011	Mount Lemmon	Mount Lemmon Survey	·	460 m	MPC · JPL
762947	2011 SJ_{247}	—	September 30, 2011	Kitt Peak	Spacewatch	·	930 m	MPC · JPL
762948	2011 SA_{248}	—	November 2, 2007	Mount Lemmon	Mount Lemmon Survey	·	1.1 km	MPC · JPL
762949	2011 SW_{251}	—	September 19, 2006	Kitt Peak	Spacewatch	·	1.5 km	MPC · JPL
762950	2011 ST_{256}	—	September 21, 2011	Kitt Peak	Spacewatch	·	910 m	MPC · JPL
762951	2011 SK_{259}	—	September 26, 2011	Kitt Peak	Spacewatch	·	990 m	MPC · JPL
762952	2011 SY_{263}	—	August 27, 2011	Haleakala	Pan-STARRS 1	·	2.3 km	MPC · JPL
762953	2011 SB_{264}	—	September 18, 2011	Mount Lemmon	Mount Lemmon Survey	SYL	3.3 km	MPC · JPL
762954	2011 SJ_{264}	—	September 18, 2011	Mount Lemmon	Mount Lemmon Survey	VER	2.1 km	MPC · JPL
762955	2011 SF_{271}	—	September 8, 2011	Kitt Peak	Spacewatch	·	1.1 km	MPC · JPL
762956	2011 SR_{277}	—	September 18, 2011	Mount Lemmon	Mount Lemmon Survey	3:2	3.9 km	MPC · JPL
762957	2011 SK_{278}	—	October 7, 2007	Mount Lemmon	Mount Lemmon Survey	·	920 m	MPC · JPL
762958	2011 SP_{279}	—	August 27, 2006	Kitt Peak	Spacewatch	·	1.2 km	MPC · JPL
762959	2011 SK_{281}	—	September 28, 2011	Mount Lemmon	Mount Lemmon Survey	·	1.4 km	MPC · JPL
762960	2011 SV_{281}	—	September 30, 2011	Kitt Peak	Spacewatch	(5)	1.0 km	MPC · JPL
762961	2011 SO_{283}	—	July 5, 2016	Haleakala	Pan-STARRS 1	EOS	1.4 km	MPC · JPL
762962	2011 SJ_{284}	—	September 8, 2011	Kitt Peak	Spacewatch	·	1.0 km	MPC · JPL
762963	2011 SO_{284}	—	September 29, 2011	Mount Lemmon	Mount Lemmon Survey	·	2.2 km	MPC · JPL
762964	2011 SE_{286}	—	March 19, 2013	Haleakala	Pan-STARRS 1	·	420 m	MPC · JPL
762965	2011 SH_{287}	—	August 21, 2015	Haleakala	Pan-STARRS 1	HNS	1.0 km	MPC · JPL
762966	2011 SE_{288}	—	September 25, 2011	Haleakala	Pan-STARRS 1	·	2.5 km	MPC · JPL
762967	2011 SR_{288}	—	August 9, 2015	Haleakala	Pan-STARRS 1	MAR	690 m	MPC · JPL
762968	2011 SW_{290}	—	September 21, 2011	Mount Lemmon	Mount Lemmon Survey	·	820 m	MPC · JPL
762969	2011 SC_{291}	—	September 19, 2011	Haleakala	Pan-STARRS 1	·	520 m	MPC · JPL
762970	2011 SN_{293}	—	September 23, 2011	Kitt Peak	Spacewatch	·	1.2 km	MPC · JPL
762971	2011 SE_{297}	—	September 23, 2011	Haleakala	Pan-STARRS 1	·	2.4 km	MPC · JPL
762972	2011 SK_{297}	—	October 15, 2017	Mount Lemmon	Mount Lemmon Survey	·	2.5 km	MPC · JPL
762973	2011 SN_{297}	—	October 23, 2017	Mount Lemmon	Mount Lemmon Survey	·	2.9 km	MPC · JPL
762974	2011 SS_{297}	—	September 24, 2011	Haleakala	Pan-STARRS 1	·	1.1 km	MPC · JPL
762975	2011 SV_{301}	—	February 28, 2014	Haleakala	Pan-STARRS 1	·	2.1 km	MPC · JPL
762976	2011 SB_{305}	—	July 28, 2015	Haleakala	Pan-STARRS 1	·	810 m	MPC · JPL
762977	2011 SR_{305}	—	September 29, 2011	Mount Lemmon	Mount Lemmon Survey	·	970 m	MPC · JPL
762978	2011 ST_{305}	—	July 5, 2016	Mount Lemmon	Mount Lemmon Survey	VER	2.1 km	MPC · JPL
762979	2011 SP_{308}	—	September 18, 2011	Mount Lemmon	Mount Lemmon Survey	·	860 m	MPC · JPL
762980	2011 SR_{308}	—	September 18, 2011	Mount Lemmon	Mount Lemmon Survey	L5	6.6 km	MPC · JPL
762981	2011 SU_{308}	—	September 28, 2011	Kitt Peak	Spacewatch	·	1.1 km	MPC · JPL
762982	2011 SE_{312}	—	September 18, 2011	Mount Lemmon	Mount Lemmon Survey	HOF	1.9 km	MPC · JPL
762983	2011 SG_{312}	—	September 20, 2011	Kitt Peak	Spacewatch	·	1.3 km	MPC · JPL
762984	2011 SE_{313}	—	September 25, 2011	Haleakala	Pan-STARRS 1	·	1.6 km	MPC · JPL
762985	2011 SG_{317}	—	September 28, 2011	Kitt Peak	Spacewatch	·	2.7 km	MPC · JPL
762986	2011 SC_{322}	—	September 30, 2011	Kitt Peak	Spacewatch	·	1.4 km	MPC · JPL
762987	2011 SO_{326}	—	September 19, 2011	Haleakala	Pan-STARRS 1	·	1.2 km	MPC · JPL
762988	2011 ST_{326}	—	November 18, 2007	Kitt Peak	Spacewatch	·	1 km	MPC · JPL
762989	2011 SG_{328}	—	September 20, 2011	Haleakala	Pan-STARRS 1	EUN	1.1 km	MPC · JPL
762990	2011 SC_{331}	—	September 20, 2011	Mount Lemmon	Mount Lemmon Survey	·	2.5 km	MPC · JPL
762991	2011 SV_{331}	—	September 28, 2011	Kitt Peak	Spacewatch	·	1.8 km	MPC · JPL
762992	2011 SQ_{334}	—	September 29, 2011	Kitt Peak	Spacewatch	·	1.9 km	MPC · JPL
762993	2011 SO_{336}	—	September 23, 2011	Kitt Peak	Spacewatch	EOS	1.6 km	MPC · JPL
762994	2011 SU_{339}	—	September 20, 2011	Haleakala	Pan-STARRS 1	·	2.5 km	MPC · JPL
762995	2011 SS_{341}	—	September 25, 2011	Haleakala	Pan-STARRS 1	·	450 m	MPC · JPL
762996	2011 SF_{342}	—	September 18, 2011	Mount Lemmon	Mount Lemmon Survey	·	920 m	MPC · JPL
762997	2011 SU_{342}	—	September 29, 2011	Mount Lemmon	Mount Lemmon Survey	·	1.4 km	MPC · JPL
762998	2011 SW_{343}	—	September 23, 2011	Haleakala	Pan-STARRS 1	·	1.8 km	MPC · JPL
762999	2011 SH_{345}	—	September 29, 2011	Mount Lemmon	Mount Lemmon Survey	·	2.0 km	MPC · JPL
763000	2011 SB_{348}	—	September 26, 2011	Haleakala	Pan-STARRS 1	·	1.1 km	MPC · JPL

back to top
