= (528219) 2008 KV42 =

Trans-Neptunian object on a retrograde polar orbit

(528219) 2008 KV_{42}
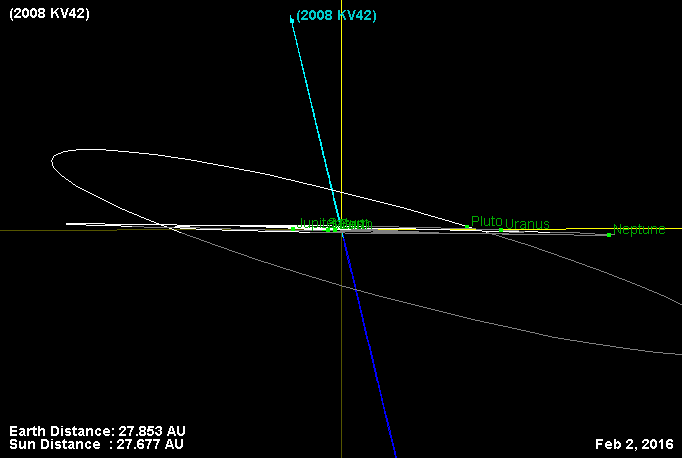
- The orbit of 2008 KV_{42} is nearly perpendicular to the ecliptic

Discovery
- Discovered by: Mauna Kea Obs.
- Discovery site: Mauna Kea Obs.
- Discovery date: 31 May 2008

Designations
- Alternative designations: "Drac" (nickname)
- Minor planet category: TNO · centaur; damocloid · distant

Orbital characteristics
- Epoch 1 July 2021 (JD 2459396.5)
- Uncertainty parameter 3 · 1
- Observation arc: 12.20 yr (4,456 d)
- Aphelion: 62.917 AU
- Perihelion: 21.152 AU
- Semi-major axis: 42.035 AU
- Eccentricity: 0.4968
- Orbital period (sidereal): 272.53 yr (99,543 d)
- Mean anomaly: 341.23°
- Mean motion: 0° 0^{m} 12.96^{s} / day
- Inclination: 103.41°
- Longitude of ascending node: 260.91°
- Argument of perihelion: 132.61°
- Uranus MOID: 4.26 AU
- T_{Jupiter}: −1.0210

Physical characteristics
- Mean diameter: 101 km (est. at 0.058)
- Apparent magnitude: 22.89
- Absolute magnitude (H): 8.8

(528219) 2008 KV_{42} (nicknamed Drac) is a trans-Neptunian object and the first one with a retrograde orbit to be discovered. This retrograde motion with an orbital inclination of 103° suggests that it is the missing link between its source in the Hills cloud and Halley-type comets, thus providing further insight into the evolution of the outer Solar System. The object measures approximately 101 kilometers (63 miles) in diameter. With a semi-major axis of 42 AU, it takes about 269 years to complete an orbit around the Sun.

2008 KV_{42} was discovered by astronomers at Mauna Kea Observatory on 31 May 2008. The discovery team nicknamed 2008 KV_{42} "Drac" after Count Dracula.

== Discovery and naming ==
The discovery of 2008 KV_{42} was announced on 16 July 2008 by the Canada–France Ecliptic Plane Survey team led by Brett Gladman from the University of British Columbia. The announcement was made during the "Asteroids, Comets, Meteors" meeting held in Baltimore, Maryland, followed by a Minor Planet Electronic Circular on the same day and an IAU Circular on 18 July. The discovery was made using images obtained on 31 May from the 3.5-meter Canada–France–Hawaii Telescope, followed by further observations until 8 July from the Whipple Observatory and Cerro Tololo.

The discovery team nicknamed 2008 KV_{42} "Drac" because of its high inclination in reference to its orbital plane resembling Count Dracula's ability to walk on walls.

== Orbit ==
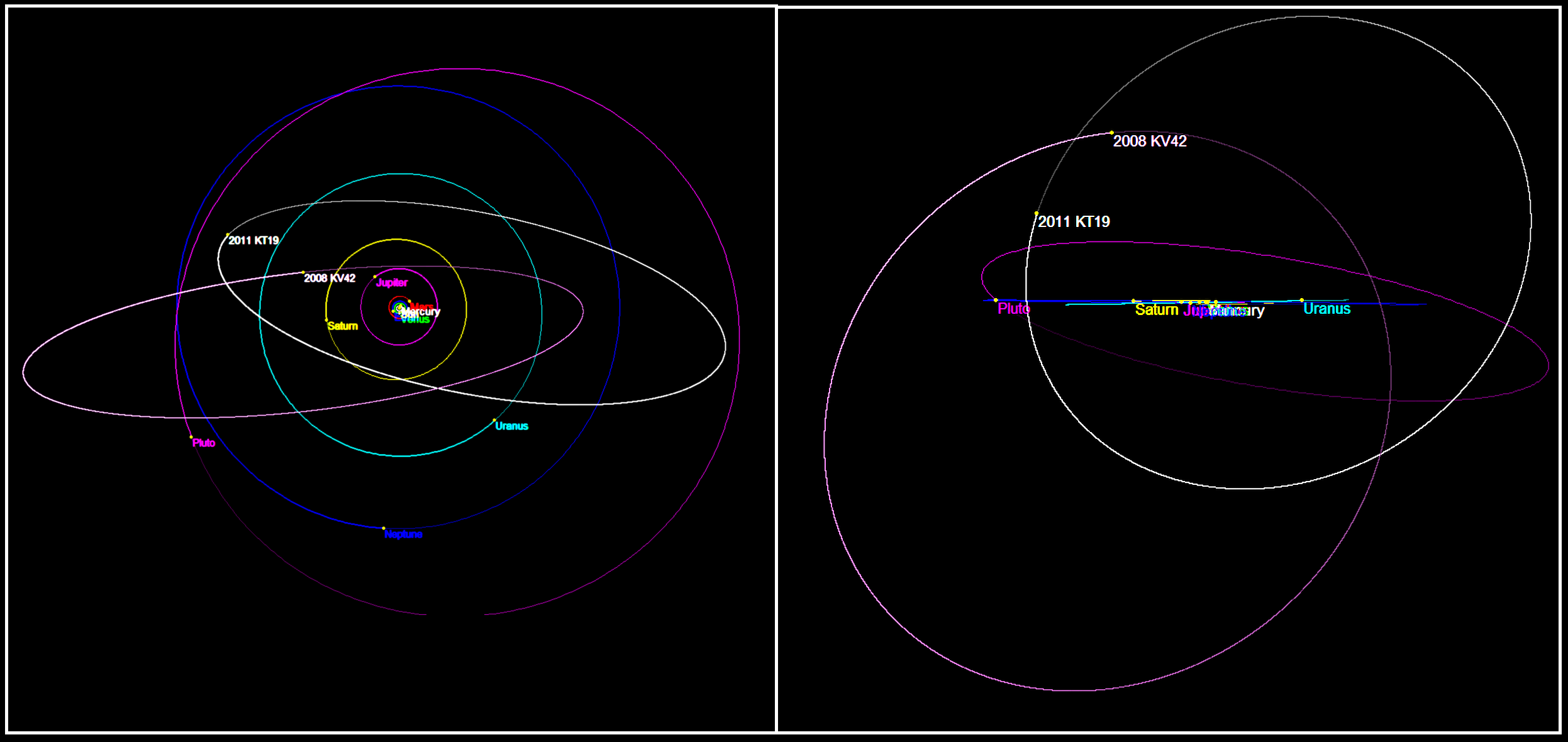
Polar view and side view of the orbits of 2008 KV_{42} (pink) and 471325 Taowu (white)

2008 KV_{42} is the first trans-Neptunian object (TNO) with a retrograde orbit to be discovered. With a semi-major axis of 41.7 AU, it was discovered while at a distance of 32 AU and has a perihelion at roughly the distance of Uranus.

The object's 103° inclination makes it almost perpendicular to the ecliptic, and is, as of July 2017, one of only six objects known to have inclination and perihelion larger than 60° and 15 AU, respectively. The other five are: (127546) 2002 XU93, 2007 BP102, (762135) 2010 WG9, 471325 Taowu, and (523719) 2014 LM28.

Its unusual orbit suggests that 2008 KV_{42} may have been perturbed inwards from its source, most likely in the Hills cloud, by an unknown gravitational disturbance. Its discovery may reveal the source regions for Halley-type comets which also have an retrograde orbit, but their origin remains unknown. 2008 KV_{42} itself is believed to be in an intermediate stage towards becoming a comet, thus helping to further explain the formation and evolution of the outer Solar System.

=== Planet Nine ===
2008 KV_{42} may even provide evidence of Planet Nine. The Kozai effect inside the mean-motion resonances with Planet Nine may cause a periodic exchange between its inclination and its eccentricity. When the elongated perpendicular centaurs get too close to a giant planet, orbits such as that of 2008 KV_{42} are created.

== See also ==
- List of trans-Neptunian objects
- 471325 Taowu
