= 2007 BP102 =

Centaur

2007 BP_{102}
Discovery
- Discovery site: Mauna Kea Obs.
- Discovery date: 24 January 2007

Designations
- Minor planet category: centaur · distant damocloid

Orbital characteristics
- Epoch 21 November 2025 (JD 2461000.5)
- Uncertainty parameter 4
- Observation arc: 9.30 yr (3,396 days)
- Aphelion: 29.985 AU
- Perihelion: 17.692 AU
- Semi-major axis: 23.839 AU
- Eccentricity: 0.2578
- Orbital period (sidereal): 116.39 yr (42,513 days)
- Mean anomaly: 49.539°
- Mean motion: 0° 0^{m} 30.6^{s} / day
- Inclination: 64.829°
- Longitude of ascending node: 45.293°
- Argument of perihelion: 124.87°
- T_{Jupiter}: 1.977

Physical characteristics
- Dimensions: 34 km (calculated)
- Geometric albedo: 0.09 (assumed)
- Absolute magnitude (H): 10.6

2007 BP_{102} is a high inclination centaur and damocloid from the outer regions of the Solar System, approximately 34 kilometers in diameter. It was first observed by astronomers at the Mauna Kea Observatories on 24 January 2007.

With a Tisserand's parameter of 1.977, it may be considered a member of the damocloids, a dynamical group of minor planets which have comet-like orbits without showing a cometary coma or tail. It orbits the Sun at a distance of 17.7–30 AU once every 116 years and 5 months (42,513 days). Its orbit has an eccentricity of 0.26 and an inclination of 65° with respect to the ecliptic.

As of July 2017, it is one of 7 known objects with inclination (i) > 60° and perihelion (q) > 15 AU, along with the first discovered (528219) 2008 KV42.
