= (762135) 2010 WG9 =

Trans-Neptunian object

(762135) 2010 WG_{9}
Discovery
- Discovered by: LaSilla–Quest Variability Srvy.
- Discovery site: La Silla Observatory
- Discovery date: 30 November 2010 (discovery: first observation only)

Designations
- Minor planet category: TNO · centaur · distant

Orbital characteristics
- Epoch 4 September 2017 (JD 2458000.5)
- Uncertainty parameter 3
- Observation arc: 6.22 yr (2,271 days)
- Aphelion: 87.037 AU
- Perihelion: 18.765 AU
- Semi-major axis: 52.901 AU
- Eccentricity: 0.6453
- Orbital period (sidereal): 384.77 yr (140,538 days)
- Mean anomaly: 10.821°
- Mean motion: 0° 0^{m} 9.36^{s} / day
- Inclination: 70.331°
- Longitude of ascending node: 92.065°
- Argument of perihelion: 293.00°
- Known satellites: 1

Physical characteristics
- Dimensions: 100.81 km (calculated); 112.7±61.9 km
- Synodic rotation period: 263.8±0.1 h
- Geometric albedo: 0.074±0.080; 0.10 (assumed)
- Spectral type: B–R = 1.10; B–V = 0.798±0.034; V–R = 0.520±0.018
- Absolute magnitude (H): 8.1

(762135) 2010 WG_{9} is a high inclination, binary trans-Neptunian object and slow rotator from the outer Solar System, approximately 100 kilometers in diameter. It was first observed at ESO's La Silla Observatory in northern Chile on 30 November 2010.

== Orbit and classification ==
2010 WG_{9} orbits the Sun at a distance of 18.8–87.0 AU once every 384 years and 9 months (140,538 days). Its orbit has an eccentricity of 0.65 and an inclination of 70° with respect to the ecliptic.

As of October 2019, it is one of six known objects with inclination (i) > 60° and perihelion (q) > 15 AU, along with the first discovered (528219) 2008 KV42.

== Physical characteristics ==
=== Rotation period ===
A rotational lightcurve of 2010 WG_{9} was obtained from photometric observations by the LaSilla–Quest Variability Survey at La Silla in Chile. Lightcurve analysis gave a rotation period of 263.8 hours with a brightness amplitude of 0.14 magnitude (U=2). It belongs to the top 200 slowest rotators known to exist.

=== Diameter and albedo ===
It measures 112.7 kilometers in diameter and its surface has an albedo of 0.074. The Collaborative Asteroid Lightcurve Link assumes a standard albedo of 0.10 and calculates a diameter of 100.81 kilometers based on an absolute magnitude of 8.1.

== Satellite ==
2010 WG_{9}'s nature of being a binary TNO was first discovered on 19 December 2017 by B. Proudfoot, W. Grundy, and D. Spencer, using 300-second exposures taken with the Hubble Space Telescope. However, this discovery would not be announced publicly until 22 September 2026. The 2010 WG_{9} binary system is similar to other TNO binary systems (such as 65489 Ceto and 66652 Borasisi) in the sense that both components share nearly equal sizes. The diameter of the companion is estimated to be 79 ± 43 km (49.1 ± 26.7 mi), with an orbital period of nearly 11 days.
