= 2019 UN13 =

3rd closest non-impacting Earth approach

2019 UN_{13}
Discovery
- Discovered by: CSS (Teddy Pruyne)
- Discovery site: Catalina Stn.
- Discovery date: 31 October 2019 (first observed only)

Designations
- Alternative designations: C0PPEV1
- Minor planet category: NEO · Aten

Orbital characteristics
- Epoch 27 April 2019 (JD 2458600.5)
- Uncertainty parameter 7
- Observation arc: 3.7 hours (18 observations)
- Aphelion: 1.3301 AU (2.06 AU after passage)
- Perihelion: 0.6463 AU
- Semi-major axis: 0.9882 AU
- Eccentricity: 0.3460
- Orbital period (sidereal): 359 days
- Mean anomaly: 100.74°
- Mean motion: 1° 0^{m} 12.24^{s} / day
- Inclination: 1.4925°
- Longitude of ascending node: 217.58°
- Argument of perihelion: 291.05°
- Earth MOID: 0.000005 AU (700 km)

Physical characteristics
- Mean diameter: 1–2 m
- Mass: 2800 kg (est.)
- Absolute magnitude (H): 32.0

2019 UN_{13} is a small near-Earth asteroid roughly 1–2 meters in diameter. Even though the asteroid was in the night sky for months, it was fainter than the sky survey limit of apparent magnitude 24 until 29 October 2019 when the asteroid was two million km from Earth. It was discovered on October 31, 2019, passing 6,200 km above Earth's surface.

2020 QG and 2011 CQ1 are the only asteroids known where the nominal orbit passed closer to the surface of Earth. Other asteroids that passed very close to Earth include 2004 FU162, 2018 UA, and 2019 AS5.

An impact by 2019 UN_{13} would be less significant than the 2018 LA impact.

== 2019 flyby ==
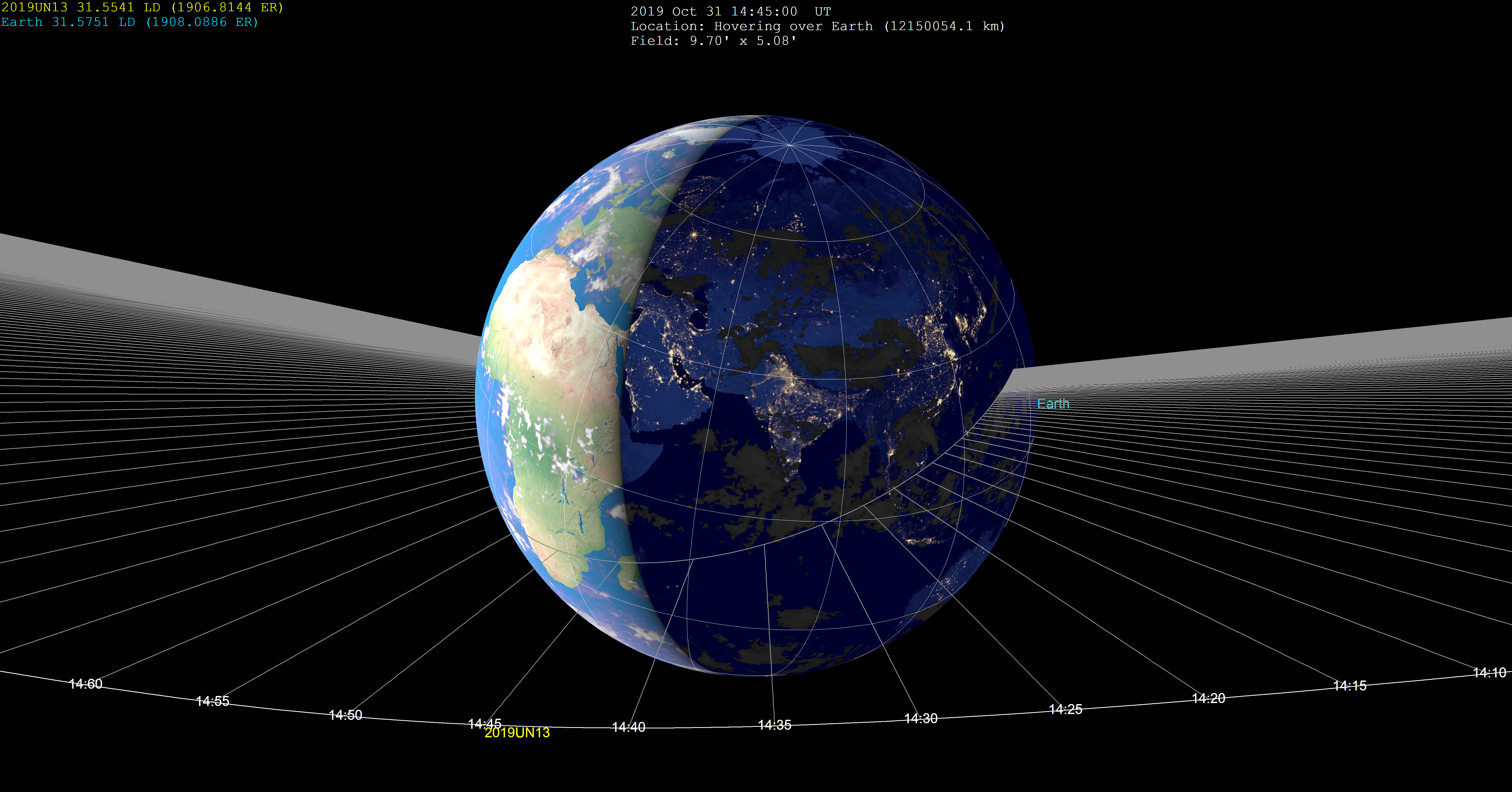

5 minute markers of trajectory above the earth near closest approach

== Orbit changes ==
The close approach to Earth lifted the asteroid's aphelion point (furthest distance from the Sun) from 1.33 AU (inside the orbit of Mars) to 2.06 AU (near the edge of the inner asteroid belt). The approach changed the orbit from an Aten asteroid with a semi-major axis less than 1 AU to an Apollo asteroid with a semi-major axis greater than that of the Earth (> 1 AU).

Orbital elements for April 2019 and April 2020
	2019	2020
Orbit type	Aten	Apollo
Perihelion (closest distance to the Sun)	0.64 AU	0.83 AU
Semi-major axis (average distance from the Sun)	0.98 AU	1.4 AU
Aphelion (furthest distance from the Sun)	1.3 AU	2.0 AU
Orbital period	358 days	637 days

With the new orbit, 2019 UN_{13} will come to perihelion 0.83 AU from the Sun on 15 December 2019. Without perturbations, the previous orbit would have come to perihelion in January 2020.

== Future ==
There is a small chance the asteroid will pass 0.0001 AU (15,000 km) from Mars on 26 October 2023. There is also a 1 in 3 million chance the asteroid will impact Earth on 1 November 2111.

== See also ==
Closest non-impacting asteroids to Earth, except Earth-grazing fireballs (using JPL SBDB numbers and Earth radius of 6,378 km)
Asteroid	Date	Distance from surface of Earth	Uncertainty in approach distance	Observation arc	Reference
2025 UC11	2025-10-30 12:11	237 km	±11 km	1 day (41 obs)	data
2020 VT4	2020-11-13 17:21	368 km	±11 km	5 days (34 obs)	data
2020 QG	2020-08-16 04:09	2939 km	±11 km	2 days (35 obs)	data
2021 UA1	2021-10-25 03:07	3049 km	±10 km	1 day (22 obs)	data
2023 BU	2023-01-27 00:29	3589 km	±<1 km	10 days (231 obs)	data
2011 CQ1	2011-02-04 19:39	5474 km	±5 km	1 day (35 obs)	data
2019 UN13	2019-10-31 14:45	6235 km	±189 km	1 day (16 obs)	data
2008 TS26	2008-10-09 03:30	6260 km	±970 km	1 day (19 obs)	data
2004 FU162	2004-03-31 15:35	6535 km	±13000 km	1 day (4 obs)	data
