= 471325 Taowu =

Trans-Neptunian object on a retrograde polar orbit

- Taowu imaged by the Canada–France–Hawaii Telescope on 22 May 2014

Discovery
- Discovered by: Mount Lemmon Survey
- Discovery site: Mount Lemmon Obs.
- Discovery date: 31 May 2011

Designations
- Pronunciation: /ˌtaʊˈwuː/
- Named after: Taowu
- Alternative designations: 2011 KT_{19}; "Niku" (nickname)
- Minor planet category: TNO · centaur distant

Orbital characteristics
- Epoch 17 October 2024 (JD 2460600.5)
- Uncertainty parameter 2
- Observation arc: 14.05 yr (5,131 d)
- Earliest precovery date: 10 May 2010
- Aphelion: 47.588 AU
- Perihelion: 23.839 AU
- Semi-major axis: 35.713 AU
- Eccentricity: 0.3325
- Orbital period (sidereal): 213.43 yr (77,955 d)
- Mean anomaly: 42.884°
- Mean motion: 0° 0^{m} 16.625^{s} / day
- Inclination: 110.311°
- Longitude of ascending node: 243.903°
- Time of perihelion: ≈ 15 May 1999 ±0.13 days
- Argument of perihelion: 322.913°

Physical characteristics
- Mean diameter: 179 km (assumed albedo 0.058)
- Apparent magnitude: 22
- Absolute magnitude (H): 7.45

471325 Taowu (provisional designation 2011 KT_{19}, formerly nicknamed Niku (/ˈniːkuː/)) is a trans-Neptunian object whose orbit is tilted 110° with respect to the ecliptic. Thus, it has a nearly polar retrograde orbit around the Sun from the reference point of Earth's orbital plane.

== Discovery ==
Taowu was discovered on 31 May 2011 by the Mount Lemmon Survey in Arizona. It was announced by the Minor Planet Center on 2 June 2011, after other telescopes confirmed the object with additional observations. The object was given the minor planet provisional designation 2011 KT_{19}, which reflects its discovery date. Initial calculations of Taowu's orbit using these few observations suggested it was a centaur on a prograde elliptical orbit (semi-major axis 28 AU, eccentricity 0.41, inclination 38°). However, Taowu was only observed for up to 8 days before being lost, due to large uncertainties in its orbit.

In 2016, a team of astronomers led by Ying-Tung Chen performed a search for outer Solar System objects in observations by the Pan-STARRS 1 survey. They rediscovered Taowu in Pan-STARRS observations from 2013–2016 and recognized it had an unusual retrograde polar orbit. Chen's team made follow-up observations at Lulin Observatory in Taiwan and found additional observations of the object in archival images from the Dark Energy Survey and Canada–France–Hawaii Telescope. After Chen's team submitted their observations of Taowu to the Minor Planet Center, it was recognized that Taowu had been previously observed by the Mount Lemmon Survey in 2011. Taowu received its permanent minor planet catalog number 471325 on 18 August 2016 and the Minor Planet Center declared Mount Lemmon Survey as the object's official discoverer.

== Name ==
The object is named after Taowu (檮杌; Táowù), one of the Four Perils in Chinese mythology. The name follows the International Astronomical Union's naming conventions for centaurs on Neptune-crossing orbits (perihelion <30 AU), which are named after mythological chimeras. The name was announced by the International Astronomical Union on 3 February 2025.

The object had previously been nicknamed Niku (逆骨; nìgǔ) by Ying-Tung Chen, who was involved with rediscovering the object and studying its orbit in 2016. The nickname is a Mandarin adjective meaning "rebellious", in reference to the object's unusual retrograde orbit.

== Orbit ==
Taowu is near, but likely not in a 7:9 resonance with Neptune. While it was thought to be fully resonant upon initial observation, more accurate measurements indicate Taowu will leave temporary libration within the next 500,000 years. Notably, it is part of a group of objects that orbit the Sun in a highly inclined orbit; the reasons for this unusual orbit are unknown as of August 2016. Taowu's orbital characteristics have been compared to those of 2008 KV42 (nicknamed "Drac"). The orbits of Taowu, 2008 KV_{42}, 2002 XU93, 2010 WG9, 2007 BP102, and 2011 MM4 appear to occupy a common plane, with three in prograde and three in retrograde orbits. The probability of this alignment occurring by chance is 0.016%. These orbits should leave a common plane in a few million years because the precession of prograde and retrograde orbits are in opposite directions. Simulations including the hypothetical Planet Nine did not maintain a common orbital plane and the plane does not coincide with the plane of the predicted high-inclination large semi-major axis objects of that model. Other simulations with a few Earth-mass dwarf planet on a high-inclination orbit also failed to reproduce the alignment.

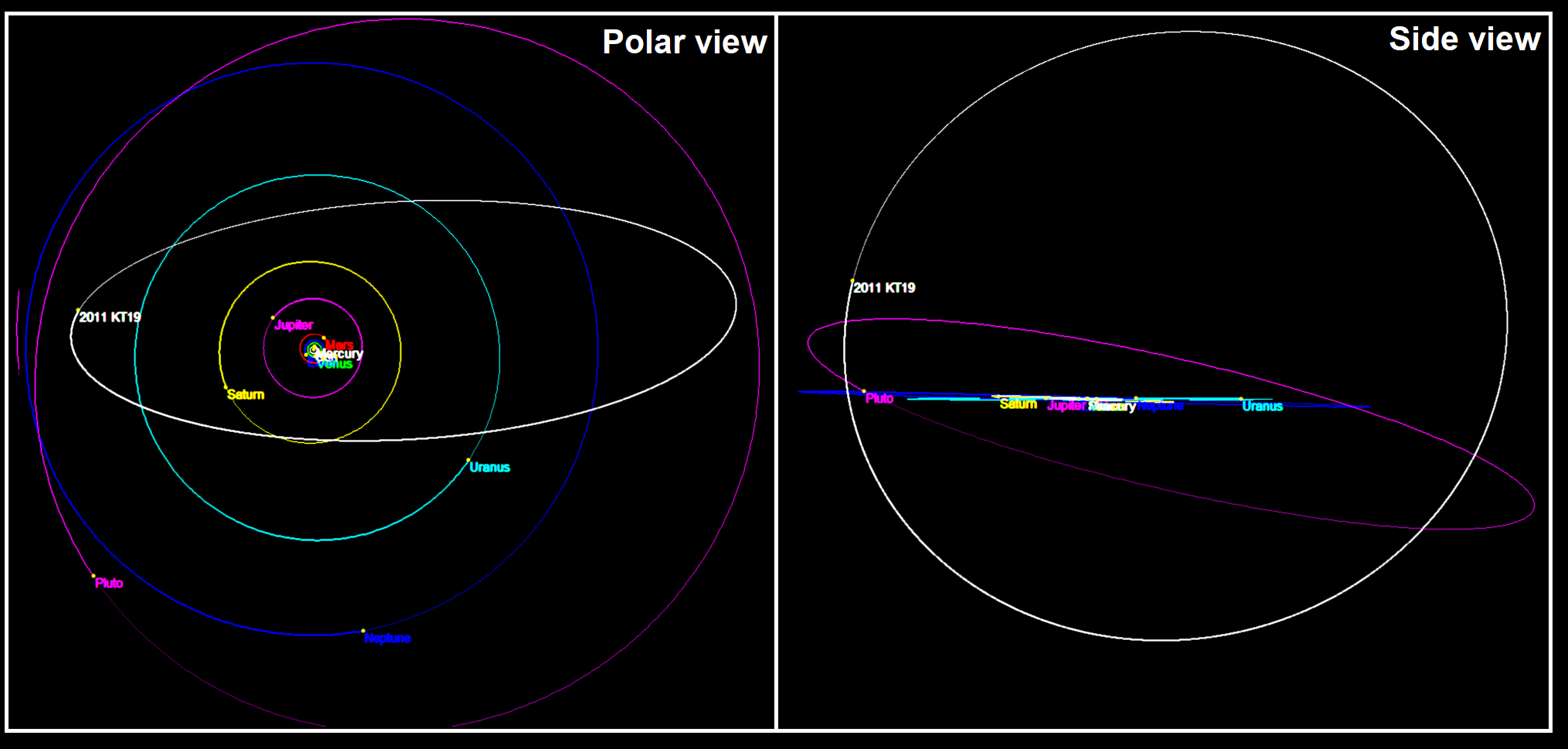
The orbit of Taowu (white) in relation to Pluto and the planets of the Solar System
The orbit of Taowu (purple), is shown with another steep retrograde TNO, 2008 KV42 (yellow), and the other planets. Pluto's orbit is in red.

== Physical characteristics ==
The diameter of Taowu has not been measured, but it can be estimated from its brightness (absolute magnitude) using a range of plausible values for its surface reflectivity (geometric albedo). If Taowu reflects between 5% and 25% of visible light, then its diameter is between 100 and 200 km (62 and 124 mi). A 2023 study has attempted to check if Taowu exhibits brightness variability due to its rotation, but results have not yet been published.
