= 2008 TS26 =

Near-Earth asteroid

2008 TS_{26}
Discovery
- Discovered by: Andrea Boattini
- Discovery site: Mount Lemmon Obs.
- Discovery date: 9 October 2008

Designations
- Minor planet category: NEO · Apollo

Orbital characteristics
- Epoch 9 October 2008 (JD 2454748.5)
- Aphelion: 3.016 AU
- Perihelion: 0.828 AU
- Semi-major axis: 1.922 AU
- Eccentricity: 0.56913
- Orbital period (sidereal): 973.45 days (2.67 years)
- Mean anomaly: 14.885°
- Mean motion: 0° 22^{m} 11.352^{s} / day
- Inclination: 0.819°
- Longitude of ascending node: 16.426°
- Argument of perihelion: 301.63°

Physical characteristics
- Mean diameter: 0.61–1.36 m (2.0–4.5 ft)
- Absolute magnitude (H): 33.2

2008 TS_{26} is a small near-Earth Apollo asteroid that made a very close approach to Earth at a distance of 12,630 km (7,850 mi) on 9 October 2008. It has a mean diameter between 61 centimeters and 1.36 meters, making it one of the smallest known asteroids in the Solar System.

Closest non-impacting asteroids to Earth, except Earth-grazing fireballs (using JPL SBDB numbers and Earth radius of 6,378 km)
Asteroid	Date	Distance from surface of Earth	Uncertainty in approach distance	Observation arc	Reference
2025 UC11	2025-10-30 12:11	237 km	±11 km	1 day (41 obs)	data
2020 VT4	2020-11-13 17:21	368 km	±11 km	5 days (34 obs)	data
2020 QG	2020-08-16 04:09	2939 km	±11 km	2 days (35 obs)	data
2021 UA1	2021-10-25 03:07	3049 km	±10 km	1 day (22 obs)	data
2023 BU	2023-01-27 00:29	3589 km	±<1 km	10 days (231 obs)	data
2011 CQ1	2011-02-04 19:39	5474 km	±5 km	1 day (35 obs)	data
2019 UN13	2019-10-31 14:45	6235 km	±189 km	1 day (16 obs)	data
2008 TS26	2008-10-09 03:30	6260 km	±970 km	1 day (19 obs)	data
2004 FU162	2004-03-31 15:35	6535 km	±13000 km	1 day (4 obs)	data

== See also ==
- List of Solar System objects by size
