= 2006 BZ8 =

Centaur and damocloid

2006 BZ_{8}
Discovery
- Discovered by: CSS
- Discovery site: Catalina Stn.
- Discovery date: 23 January 2006 (first observed only)

Designations
- Minor planet category: centaur · damocloid unusual · distant

Orbital characteristics
- Epoch 21 November 2025 (JD 2461000.5)
- Uncertainty parameter 2
- Observation arc: 1.71 yr (623 days)
- Aphelion: 17.303 AU
- Perihelion: 1.918 AU
- Semi-major axis: 9.611 AU
- Eccentricity: 0.8004
- Orbital period (sidereal): 29.79 yr (10,882 d)
- Mean anomaly: 234.837°
- Mean motion: 0° 1^{m} 59.091^{s} / day
- Inclination: 165.301°
- Longitude of ascending node: 183.673°
- Argument of perihelion: 82.220°
- Earth MOID: 0.9970 AU
- Jupiter MOID: 0.2084 AU
- Saturn MOID: 1.6202 AU
- T_{Jupiter}: –1.035

Physical characteristics
- Mean diameter: 9.0–24.5 km
- Synodic rotation period: 5.960±0.003 h
- Geometric albedo: 0.020+0.022 −0.010
- Absolute magnitude (H): 14.17±0.13 (linear) (Note: Linear fit of CSS V-band photometry using a phase slope of β = 0.054±0.008 mag per degree of phase angle.); 13.82±0.15 (H-G) (Note: Two-parameter H-G modeling of V-band CSS photometry takes the opposition effect into account, yielding an absolute magnitude of H = 13.82±0.15 and a slope parameter of G = −0.12±0.10.)

2006 BZ_{8} is a dark centaur and damocloid on a retrograde and highly eccentric orbit from the outer region of the Solar System. It was first observed on 23 January 2006 by the Catalina Sky Survey at the Catalina Station near Tucson, Arizona, United States. It has not been observed since 2008. This unusual object is estimated around 9–23.5 kilometers (5.6–15 miles) in diameter.

== See also ==
- List of notable asteroids § Retrograde and highly inclined
- 2006 RJ2 – retrograde centaur, damocloid, and potential co-orbital with Saturn
- 2017 SV13 – another retrograde centaur, damocloid, and potential co-orbital with Saturn
