= 2017 SX17 =

Asteroid discovered in 2017

2017 SX_{17}
Discovery
- Discovered by: Mount Lemmon Srvy.
- Discovery site: Mount Lemon Obs.
- Discovery date: 29 September 2017

Designations
- Minor planet category: NEO · Apollo

Orbital characteristics
- Epoch 23 March 2018 (JD 2458200.5)
- Uncertainty parameter 5
- Observation arc: 8 days
- Aphelion: 1.4625 AU
- Perihelion: 0.8673 AU
- Semi-major axis: 1.1649 AU
- Eccentricity: 0.2555
- Orbital period (sidereal): 1.26 yr (459 d)
- Mean anomaly: 90.265°
- Mean motion: 0° 47^{m} 2.4^{s} / day
- Inclination: 2.8675°
- Longitude of ascending node: 189.81°
- Argument of perihelion: 249.11°
- Earth MOID: 0.00082 AU (0.32 LD)

Physical characteristics
- Mean diameter: 6 m (est. at 0.24); 8 m (estimate); 12 m (est. at 0.057)
- Absolute magnitude (H): 28.3

2017 SX_{17} is a very small asteroid, classified as a near-Earth object of the Apollo group, approximately 6–12 meters (20–40 feet) in diameter. It was first observed by astronomers of the Mount Lemmon Survey at Mount Lemmon Observatory on 29 September 2017, three days prior to its sub-lunar close encounter with Earth at 0.23 lunar distances on 2 October 2017.

== Orbit and classification ==
2017 SX_{17} is a member of the Apollo asteroids, which cross the orbit of Earth. Apollo's are the largest group of near-Earth objects with approximately 10 thousand known objects.

It orbits the Sun at a distance of 0.87–1.46 AU once every 15 months (459 days; semi-major axis of 1.16 AU). Its orbit has an eccentricity of 0.26 and an inclination of 3° with respect to the ecliptic.

The body's observation arc begins with an observation made by Pan-STARRS on 24 September 2017, five days prior to its official first observation.

=== Close approaches ===
The object last approached the Earth on 2 October 2017, at 10:20 UT, at a distance of 87,065 kilometres (54,100 miles) at a speed of 26,310 km/h (16,350 mph). This distance corresponds to 0.000582 AU (0.226 LD).

After the 2017-flyby, it still has an exceptionally low minimum orbital intersection distance with Earth of 123,000 km (0.00082 AU), or 0.032 lunar distances (LD).

=== Approaches in 2017 ===
Date/Time (UT)	Nominal Distance (AU, LD and km)	Body
1 October 2017 – 22:29	0.001737 AU (0.676 LD; 259,900 km)	Moon
2 October 2017 – 10:20	0.000582 AU (0.226 LD; 87,100 km)	Earth

== Physical characteristics ==
Based on a generic magnitude-to-diameter conversion, 2017 SX_{17} measures between 6–12 meters (20–40 feet) in diameter, for an absolute magnitude of 28.3, and an assumed albedo between 0.057 and 0.24, which represent typical values for carbonaceous and stony asteroids, respectively.

As of 2018, no rotational lightcurve has been obtained from photometric observations. The body's rotation period, pole and shape remain unknown.

== Numbering and naming ==
This minor planet has neither been numbered nor named by the Minor Planet Center.
