= 2020 QG =

Earth-crossing asteroid

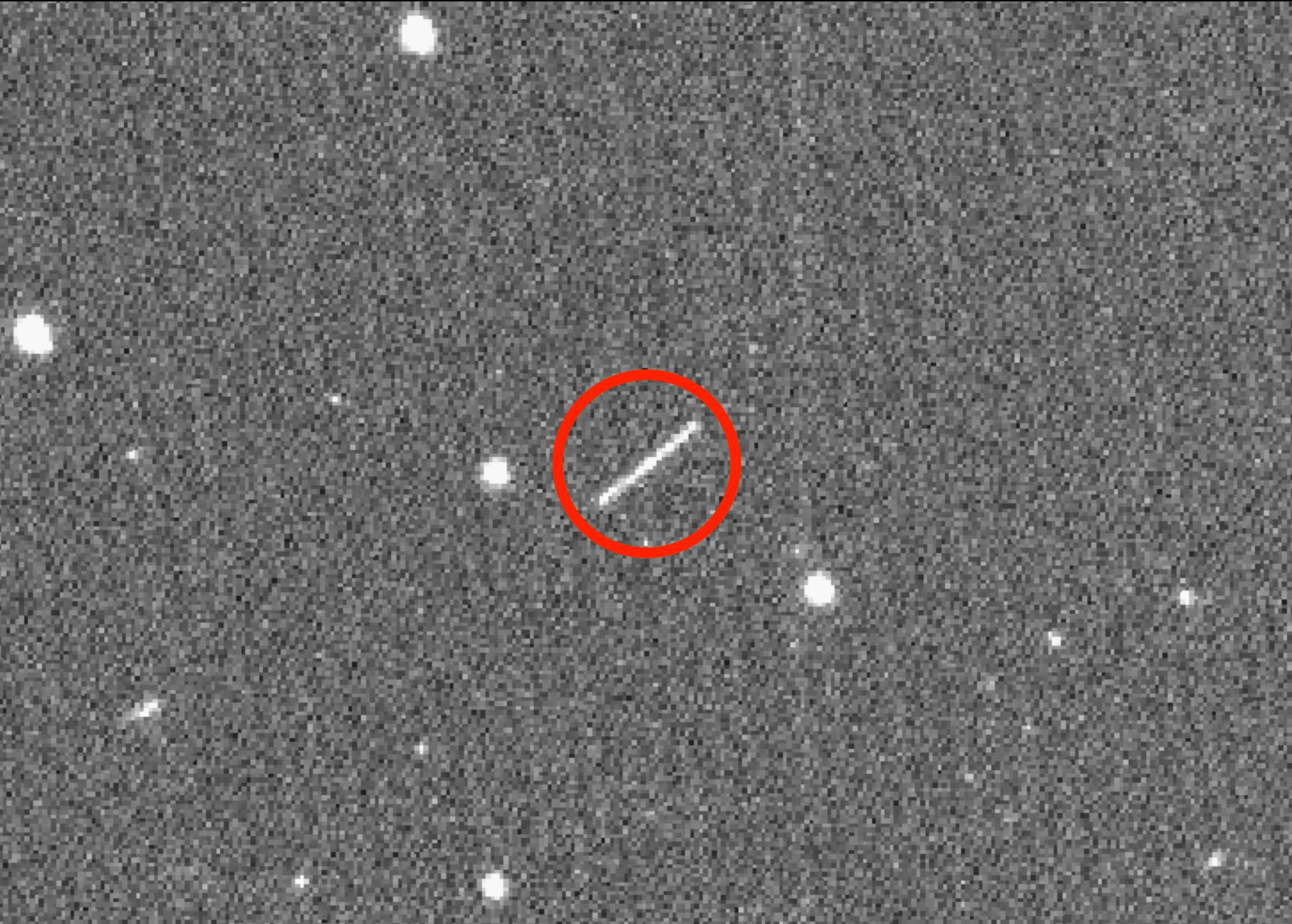
- 2020 QG imaged as a streak of light by the Zwicky Transient Facility on 16 August 2020

Discovery
- Discovered by: Zwicky Transient Facility
- Discovery site: Palomar Obs.
- Discovery date: 16 August 2020

Designations
- Alternative designations: ZTF0DxQ
- Minor planet category: NEO · Apollo

Orbital characteristics
- Epoch 31 May 2020 (JD 2459000.5)
- Uncertainty parameter 6
- Observation arc: 1.6 days (Note: The Minor Planet Center's solution uses only 28 of the 35 observations.)
- Aphelion: 2.8933±0.0009 AU
- Perihelion: 0.99628 AU
- Semi-major axis: 1.9448±0.0006 AU
- Eccentricity: 0.48772±0.0002
- Orbital period (sidereal): 2.71 yr (990.51±0.47 d)
- Mean anomaly: 337.41±0.011°
- Mean motion: 0° 21^{m} 48.696^{s} / day
- Inclination: 5.4727±0.004°
- Longitude of ascending node: 143.50°
- Time of perihelion: 1 August 2020 03:43 UT
- Argument of perihelion: 162.01±0.003°
- Earth MOID: 0.00027 AU (40,000 km)

Physical characteristics
- Mean diameter: ~3 m (est. at ~0.17); 2–14 m (est. at 0.01–0.60)
- Absolute magnitude (H): 29.87±0.25

2020 QG is an Earth-crossing asteroid, a few meters in diameter. It belongs to the Apollo group, and passed above the surface of Earth approximately 2,950 kilometres (1,830 mi) away (Note: The asteroid passed about 9317±20 km from the center of Earth and Earth has a radius of 6371 km. (9317 – 6371 = 2946)) (less than half an Earth radius) on 16 August 2020 at 04:09 UT. It was first imaged by the Zwicky Transient Facility (ZTF) at the Palomar Observatory about 6 hours after this closest approach, and was later identified by Kunal Deshmukh, a student at the Indian Institute of Technology Bombay, along with colleagues Kritti Sharma, Chen-Yen Hsu and Bryce T. Bolin analyzing images from the ZTF.

At the time, 2020 QG passed closer to Earth than any known asteroid, except for those that became meteors. It passed closer than 2011 CQ1 and 2020 JJ. (Note: Due to short arcs and the uncertainty in their approach distances asteroids such as 2004 FU162 and 2014 LY21 may have passed closer to Earth, but their nominal solutions did not.) Given an absolute magnitude of 29.8, it is estimated to be around 3–6 metres (10–20 ft) in diameter so similar to Earth-impactors 2008 TC3, 2014 AA, 2018 LA, and 2019 MO.

== Orbit and classification ==
2020 QG orbits the Sun at approximately 1.0–2.9 AU every 964.2 days (2.64 years) after its 2020 orbital perturbation by its close approach with Earth. Before perturbation, it orbited every 990.5 days (with a semi-major axis of 1.9 AU).

Before its perturbation, flying by Earth, the asteroid's orbit had an eccentricity of 0.49 and an inclination of 5.5° (with respect to the ecliptic). The asteroid came to perihelion (closest approach to the Sun) on 1 August, and then on 16 August 2020 the close approach to Earth reduced its orbital period. From the encounter with the larger gravity field, the orbital eccentricity became 0.48 and the inclination stands at 4.7°.

In May 2020, before any perturbation, the asteroid had an Earth-MOID (Minimum orbit intersection distance) of 0.00027 AU (40,000 km; 25,000 mi). Hours before the close approach the Earth-MOID was 0.0001 AU (15,000 km; 9,300 mi), the close-approach perturbation (change to orbit) bringing it closer.

Orbital Elements
Parameter	Epoch	Period (p)	aphelion (Q)	perihelion (q)	Semi-major axis (a)	eccentricity (e)	inclination (i)
Units		(days)	AU				(°)
Pre-flyby	2020-May-31	990.6	2.893	0.9962	1.945	0.4877	5.473°
Post-flyby	2020-Dec-01	964.2	2.829	0.9908	1.910	0.4813	4.737°

Animations of 2020 QG's orbit

Asteroid 2020 QG trajectory
(16 August 2020)

Around the Sun

Around the Earth

View of flyby

Sun · Earth · 2020 QG

== Detectability ==
Asteroids that are similar in size to 2020 QG are difficult to detect because they are small and therefore dim. Between 2010–2020, the asteroid was never brighter than about apparent magnitude 31 making it about 10 thousand times fainter than a typical discovery magnitude of 21. (Note: Asteroids are generally discovered when they are around apparent magnitude 19–21 because that is when they are bright enough to be detected by automated astronomical surveys. The Catalina Sky Survey and ATLAS have a limiting magnitude of 19.5. The Zwicky Transient Facility has a limiting magnitude of 20.5 and Pan-STARRS has a limiting magnitude of 24.) The Hubble Space Telescope needs 3 weeks of exposure time to image magnitude 31 objects and has an extremely small field of view, making serendipitous discoveries essentially impossible at those magnitudes. During the 2020 approach, the asteroid appeared dimmer than magnitude 24 until it had a solar elongation of only 60 degrees. The asteroid was imaged when it had a solar elongation of 125 degrees and was around magnitude 19.

== Future approaches ==
2020 QG will make several close approaches with Earth in the future, albeit at larger distances compared to the August 2020 encounter. The next close approach by 2020 QG will be in May 2028, which it will pass by Earth from a nominal distance of 0.31 AU (120 LD).

== See also ==
Closest non-impacting asteroids to Earth, except Earth-grazing fireballs (using JPL SBDB numbers and Earth radius of 6,378 km)
Asteroid	Date	Distance from surface of Earth	Uncertainty in approach distance	Observation arc	Reference
2025 UC11	2025-10-30 12:11	237 km	±11 km	1 day (41 obs)	data
2020 VT4	2020-11-13 17:21	368 km	±11 km	5 days (34 obs)	data
2020 QG	2020-08-16 04:09	2939 km	±11 km	2 days (35 obs)	data
2021 UA1	2021-10-25 03:07	3049 km	±10 km	1 day (22 obs)	data
2023 BU	2023-01-27 00:29	3589 km	±<1 km	10 days (231 obs)	data
2011 CQ1	2011-02-04 19:39	5474 km	±5 km	1 day (35 obs)	data
2019 UN13	2019-10-31 14:45	6235 km	±189 km	1 day (16 obs)	data
2008 TS26	2008-10-09 03:30	6260 km	±970 km	1 day (19 obs)	data
2004 FU162	2004-03-31 15:35	6535 km	±13000 km	1 day (4 obs)	data

- List of asteroid close approaches to Earth in 2020
- Asteroid impact prediction
