= 2023 BU =

Near-Earth asteroid

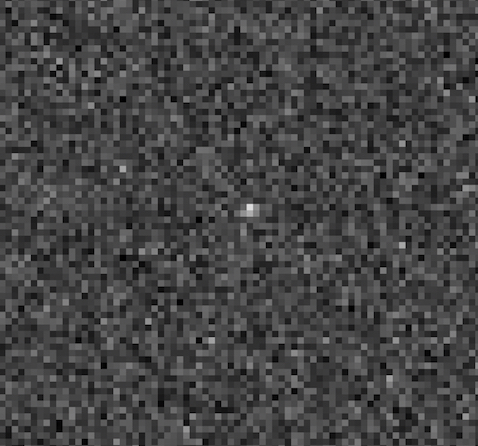
- Radar image of 2023 BU by the Goldstone Solar System Radar on 29 January 2023

Discovery
- Discovered by: Gennadiy Borisov
- Discovery site: MARGO, Nauchnyi, Crimea
- Discovery date: 21 January 2023

Designations
- Alternative designations: gb00553
- Minor planet category: NEO · Apollo

Orbital characteristics
- Epoch 25 February 2023 (JD 2460000.5) (Post-flyby orbit)
- Uncertainty parameter 1
- Observation arc: 10 days (231 obs)
- Aphelion: 1.230 AU
- Perihelion: 0.9840 AU
- Semi-major axis: 1.107 AU
- Eccentricity: 0.1111
- Orbital period (sidereal): 1.16 yr
- Mean anomaly: 28.7°
- Inclination: 3.75°
- Longitude of ascending node: 125.5°
- Time of perihelion: 27 January 2023 04:30
- Argument of perihelion: 355.8°
- Earth MOID: 0.00046 AU (69,000 km; 0.18 LD)

Physical characteristics
- Mean diameter: 3–8 meters (CNEOS)
- Synodic rotation period: ~77 seconds
- Absolute magnitude (H): 29.4±0.5 (JPL); 29.4 (MPC)

2023 BU is a near-Earth object that passed 9,967 ± 1 km (6,193.21 ± 0.62 mi) from the centerpoint of Earth around 27 January 2023 00:29 UT. Since Earth's radius is about 6,378 km (3,963 mi), it was expected to pass approximately 3,589 ± 1 km (2,230.10 ± 0.62 mi) from the surface of Earth over the southern tip of South America. It passed at an altitude above low Earth orbit which is 2,000 km (1,200 mi) and below geostationary orbit which is 36,000 km (22,000 mi). The asteroid is about 3–8 meters in diameter and approached Earth from the night sky. It is the fifth closest non-impacting approach known to Earth (excluding Earthgrazers) after 2025 UC11, 2020 VT4, 2020 QG, and 2021 UA1.

== Orbital details ==
2023 BU · Earth · Sun

The asteroid came to perihelion (closest approach to the Sun) on 27 January 2023, four hours after closest approach with Earth. 2023 BU was first imaged by Gennadiy Borisov at Nauchnyi, Crimea, on 21 January 2023 23:53 UT, about five days before closest approach. It was last observed on 31 January 2023.

2023 BU closest Earth approach on 2023-Jan-27 00:27 UT
Date and time of closest approach	Earth distance (AU)	Sun distance (AU)	Velocity wrt Earth (km/s)	Velocity wrt Sun (km/s)	Uncertainty region (3-sigma)	Reference
2023-01-27 00:27	0.000067 AU (10,000 km; 0.0261 LD)	0.985 AU (147.4 million km; 383 LD)	9.3	35.1	± 0.05 km	Horizons

The gravitational effect of the 2023 Earth approach will increase the orbital period from 359 days to an estimated 425 days. It will lift the perihelion and aphelion distances. The relatively low Earth encounter speed of 9.3 km/s (21,000 mph) is a result of a low eccentricity and Earth-like orbit.

Orbital elements
Parameter	Epoch	Period (p)	Aphelion (Q)	Perihelion (q)	Semi-major axis (a)	Eccentricity (e)	Inclination (i)
Units		(days)	AU				(°)
Pre-flyby	2022-Oct-25	358.9	1.05	0.926	0.988	0.063	2.35°
Post-flyby	2023-Feb-25	425.4	1.23	0.984	1.11	0.111	3.75°

== Impact assessment ==
There was no risk of an Earth impact during the 2023 Earth approach. Assuming the asteroid is at the larger size estimate of 8 meters in diameter, if it had entered the atmosphere it would not have reached the ground intact and would breakup around 30 km above the ground, thus representing only minimal threat to life.

Impacts by objects 8 meters (26 ft) in diameter occur, on average, every 5 years; impacts by objects 4 meters (13 ft) in diameter happen, on average, once every year. 2023 BU has a 1 in 17 million chance of impacting Earth on 20 January 2110.

History of 2023 BU closest approach uncertainties for the 3500–3600 km pass of Earth's surface
JPL SBDB solution	Observation arc	Date and time of closest approach	Uncertainty region (3-sigma) (Note: The JPL SBDB time of closest approach can vary by a minute from the Horizons time of closest approach giving them slightly different uncertainty regions. Horizons values are calculated using the JPL SBDB time of closest approach.)
JPL 1	1 day (25 obs)	2023-01-26 21:17 ± 02:22	± 2,600 km
JPL 2	2 days (30 obs)	2023-01-27 00:17 ± 01:05	± 1,700 km
JPL 3	3 days (42 obs)	2023-01-27 00:28 ± 00:10	± 262 km
JPL 4	3 days (39 obs)	2023-01-27 00:26 ± 00:10	± 260 km
JPL 5	4 days (65 obs)	2023-01-27 00:28 ± 00:02	± 29 km
JPL 6	4 days (61 obs)	2023-01-27 00:28 ± 00:02	± 27 km
JPL 9	5 days (121 obs)	2023-01-27 00:29 ± <00:01	± 5 km
JPL 11	5 days (143 obs)	2023-01-27 00:29 ± <00:01	± 2 km (Note: JPL#11 Soln.date: 2023-Jan-26_15:02:34 PST was the active solution at the time of closest approach "2023-Jan-26 16:29 PST".)
JPL 12	6 days (166 obs)	2023-01-27 00:29 ± <00:01	± 0.3 km
JPL 13	6 days (191 obs)	2023-01-27 00:29 ± <00:01	± 0.2 km
JPL 14	6 days (194 obs)	2023-01-27 00:29 ± <00:01	± 0.19 km
JPL 15	6 days (199 obs)	2023-01-27 00:29 ± <00:01	± 0.18 km
JPL 19	10 days (231 obs)	2023-01-27 00:29 ± <00:01	± 0.15 km
JPL 21	10 days (238 obs)	2023-01-27 00:29 ± <00:01	± 0.13 km

Closest non-impacting asteroids to Earth, except Earth-grazing fireballs (using JPL SBDB numbers and Earth radius of 6,378 km)
Asteroid	Date	Distance from surface of Earth	Uncertainty in approach distance	Observation arc	Reference
2025 UC11	2025-10-30 12:11	237 km	±11 km	1 day (41 obs)	data
2020 VT4	2020-11-13 17:21	368 km	±11 km	5 days (34 obs)	data
2020 QG	2020-08-16 04:09	2939 km	±11 km	2 days (35 obs)	data
2021 UA1	2021-10-25 03:07	3049 km	±10 km	1 day (22 obs)	data
2023 BU	2023-01-27 00:29	3589 km	±<1 km	10 days (231 obs)	data
2011 CQ1	2011-02-04 19:39	5474 km	±5 km	1 day (35 obs)	data
2019 UN13	2019-10-31 14:45	6235 km	±189 km	1 day (16 obs)	data
2008 TS26	2008-10-09 03:30	6260 km	±970 km	1 day (19 obs)	data
2004 FU162	2004-03-31 15:35	6535 km	±13000 km	1 day (4 obs)	data

== See also ==
- List of asteroid close approaches to Earth in 2023
