= 2017 SV13 =

Space object

2017 SV_{13}
Discovery
- Discovered by: Pan-STARRS 1
- Discovery site: Haleakala Obs.
- Discovery date: 17 September 2017 (first observed only)

Designations
- Minor planet category: centaur · damocloid unusual · distant

Orbital characteristics
- Epoch 1 July 2021 (JD 2459396.5)
- Uncertainty parameter 6
- Observation arc: 42 days
- Aphelion: 17.302 AU
- Perihelion: 2.010 AU
- Semi-major axis: 9.656 AU
- Eccentricity: 0.7919
- Orbital period (sidereal): 30.09 yr (10,990 d)
- Mean anomaly: 46.490°
- Mean motion: 0° 1^{m} 58.253^{s} / day
- Inclination: 113.283°
- Longitude of ascending node: 11.633°
- Argument of perihelion: 343.213°
- Earth MOID: 1.0349 AU
- Jupiter MOID: 2.8967 AU
- Saturn MOID: 3.1974 AU
- T_{Jupiter}: –1.119

Physical characteristics
- Mean diameter: 1 km (est.)
- Geometric albedo: 0.09 (assumed)
- Absolute magnitude (H): 18.2

2017 SV_{13} is a centaur and damocloid on a retrograde and highly eccentric orbit from the outer region of the Solar System. It was first observed on 17 September 2017 by the Pan-STARRS survey at Haleakala Observatory in Hawaii, United States. This unusual object measures approximately 1 kilometer (0.6 miles) in diameter.

== See also ==
- List of notable asteroids § Retrograde and highly inclined
- 2006 BZ8 – retrograde centaur, damocloid, and potential co-orbital with Saturn
- 2006 RJ2 – another retrograde centaur, damocloid, and potential co-orbital with Saturn
