= 2006 RJ2 =

Centaur and damocloid

2006 RJ_{2}
Discovery
- Discovered by: CSS
- Discovery site: Catalina Stn.
- Discovery date: 14 September 2006 (first observed only)

Designations
- Minor planet category: centaur · damocloid unusual · distant

Orbital characteristics
- Epoch 21 November 2025 (JD 2461000.5)
- Uncertainty parameter 7
- Observation arc: 37 days
- Aphelion: 17.015 AU
- Perihelion: 2.322 AU
- Semi-major axis: 9.668±0.091 AU
- Eccentricity: 0.7599
- Orbital period (sidereal): 30.06 yr (10,980 d)
- Mean anomaly: 231.591°
- Mean motion: 0° 1^{m} 58.03^{s} / day
- Inclination: 164.613°
- Longitude of ascending node: 191.597°
- Argument of perihelion: 161.386°
- Earth MOID: 1.3315 AU
- Jupiter MOID: 1.0638 AU
- Saturn MOID: 0.6362 AU
- T_{Jupiter}: –1.171

Physical characteristics
- Mean diameter: 3 km (est.)
- Geometric albedo: 0.09 (assumed)
- Absolute magnitude (H): 15.9

2006 RJ_{2} is a centaur and damocloid on a retrograde and highly eccentric orbit from the outer region of the Solar System. It was first observed on 14 September 2006 by the Catalina Sky Survey at the Catalina Station near Tucson, Arizona, United States. It has not been observed since 2006. This unusual object measures approximately 3 kilometers (1.9 miles) in diameter.

== See also ==
- List of notable asteroids § Retrograde and highly inclined
- 2006 BZ8 – retrograde centaur, damocloid, and potential co-orbital with Saturn
- 2017 SV13 – another retrograde centaur, damocloid, and potential co-orbital with Saturn
