= NGC 4698 =

Galaxy in the constellation Virgo

- NGC 4698 imaged by the Hubble Space Telescope

Observation data (J2000 epoch)
- Constellation: Virgo
- Right ascension: 12^{h} 48^{m} 22.9151^{s}
- Declination: +08° 29′ 14.514″
- Redshift: 0.003366±0.00000200
- Heliocentric radial velocity: 1,002 km/s
- Distance: 73.22 ± 4.17 Mly (22.448 ± 1.279 Mpc)
- Group or cluster: Virgo Cluster
- Apparent magnitude (V): 10.6
- Apparent magnitude (B): 11.46

Characteristics
- Type: SA(s)ab
- Apparent size (V): 4′.0 × 2′.9
- Notable features: Seyfert-2 galaxy

Other designations
- VCC 2070, IRAS 12458+0845, 2MASX J12482293+0829140, UGC 7970, MCG +02-33-024, PGC 43254, CGCG 071-045

NGC 4698 is a barred spiral galaxy in the constellation Virgo. It belongs to the Virgo Cluster of galaxies and is positioned near the northeastern edge of this assemblage. Its velocity with respect to the cosmic microwave background is 1,335±23 km/s, which corresponds to a Hubble distance of 64.2 ± 4.6 Mly (19.69 ± 1.42 Mpc). However, 28 non-redshift measurements give a farther mean distance of 73.22 ± 4.17 Mly (22.448 ± 1.279 Mpc). It was discovered by German-British astronomer William Herschel on 18 January 1784.

The morphological classification of NGC 4698 in the De Vaucouleurs system is SA(s)ab, which indicates a purely spiral structure with moderate to tightly wound arms. It is inclined to the line of sight from the Earth by an angle of 53° along a position angle of 170°.

A unique feature of this galaxy is that the stars and dust of the nuclear disk are rotating in a direction that is aligned perpendicularly to the galactic disk. The bulge likewise appears elongated out of the galactic plane. This unusual alignment may have been the result of a past merger event.

NGC 4698 is classified as a Seyfert-2 galaxy with an active galactic nucleus, which displays a prominent emission of radio and X-ray energy from the core while showing narrow emission lines in the optical spectrum. The unified model of Seyfert galaxies proposes that the nucleus of a Seyfert 2 galaxy is obscured by a thick torus of gas and dust. However, the varying X-ray emission of the core of NGC 4698 shows little indication of being obstructed, suggesting instead that the source of the energy emission is generally unobscured but anemic in nature.

== Gallery ==
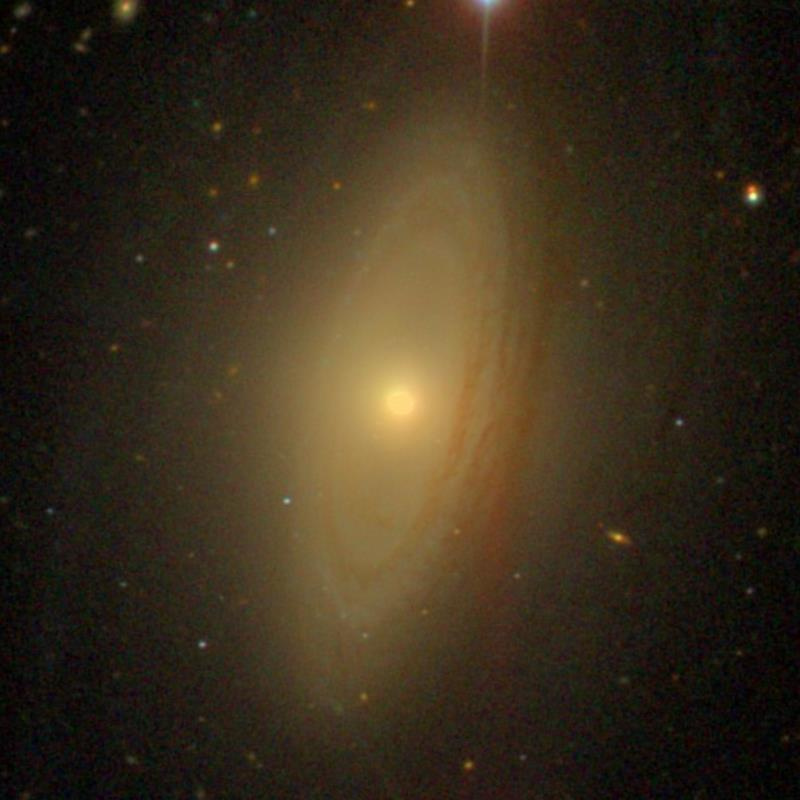
NGC 4698 (SDSS DR14)

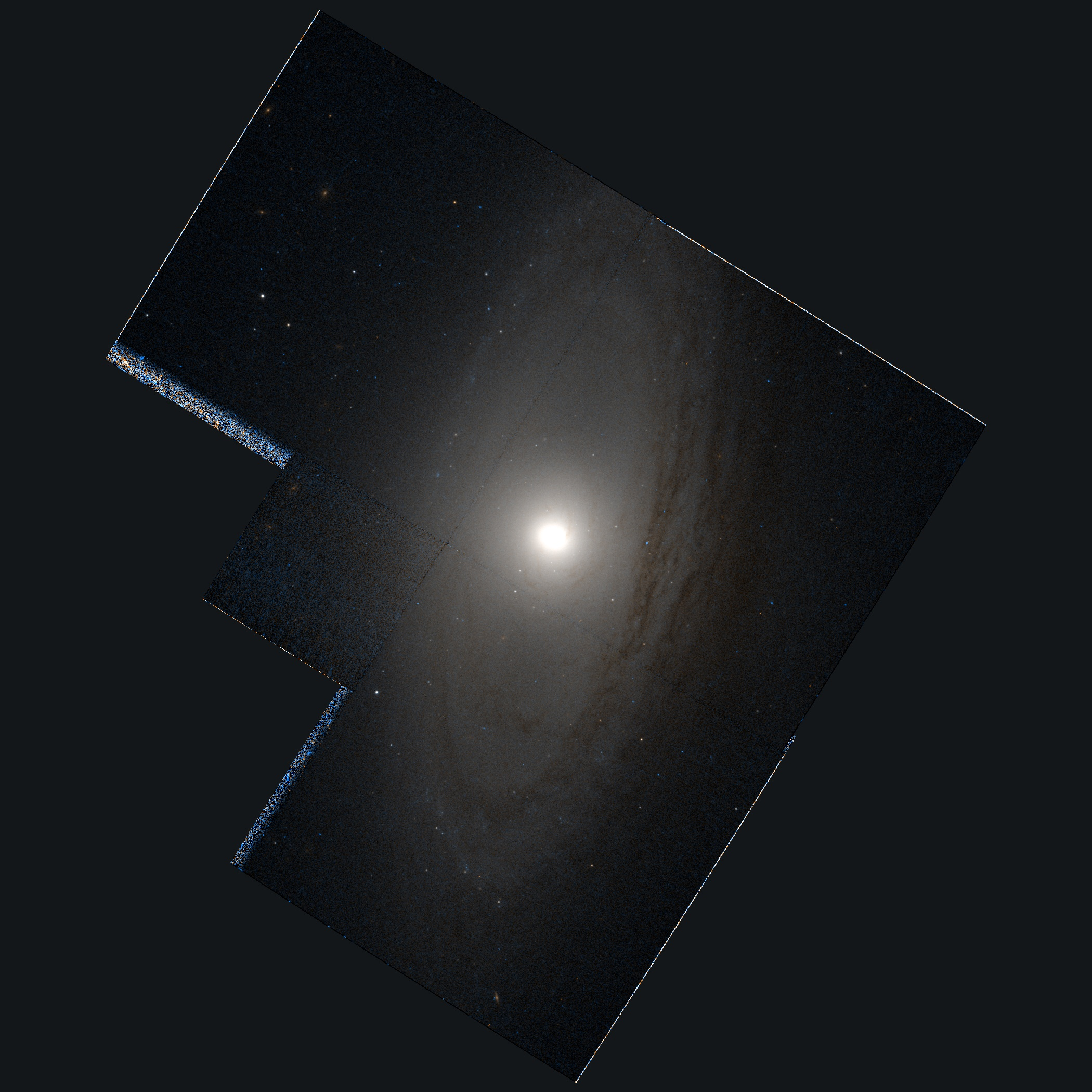
NGC 4698 (HST)

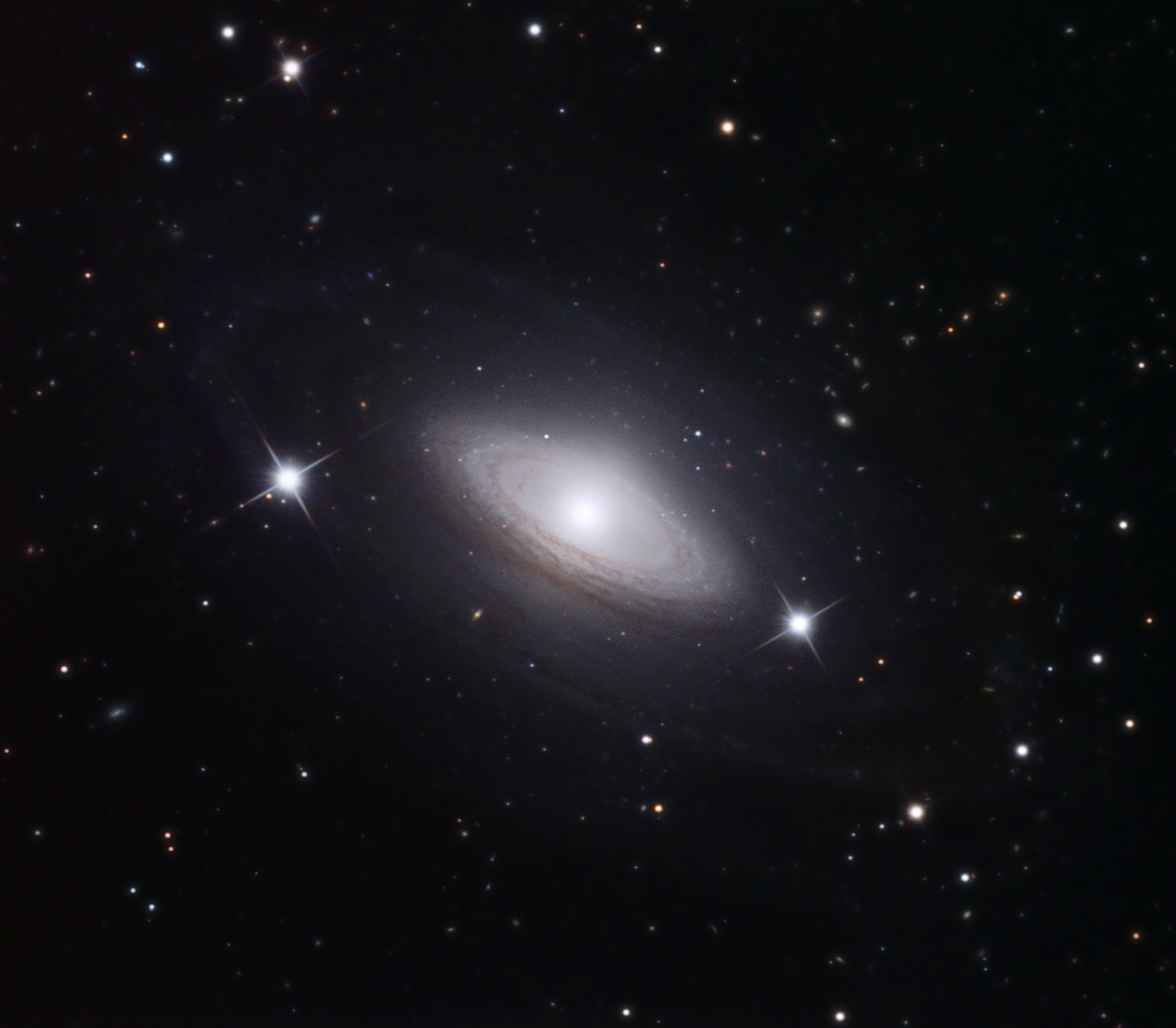
NGC 4698 by a Schulman telescope at Mt. Lemmon, AZ.

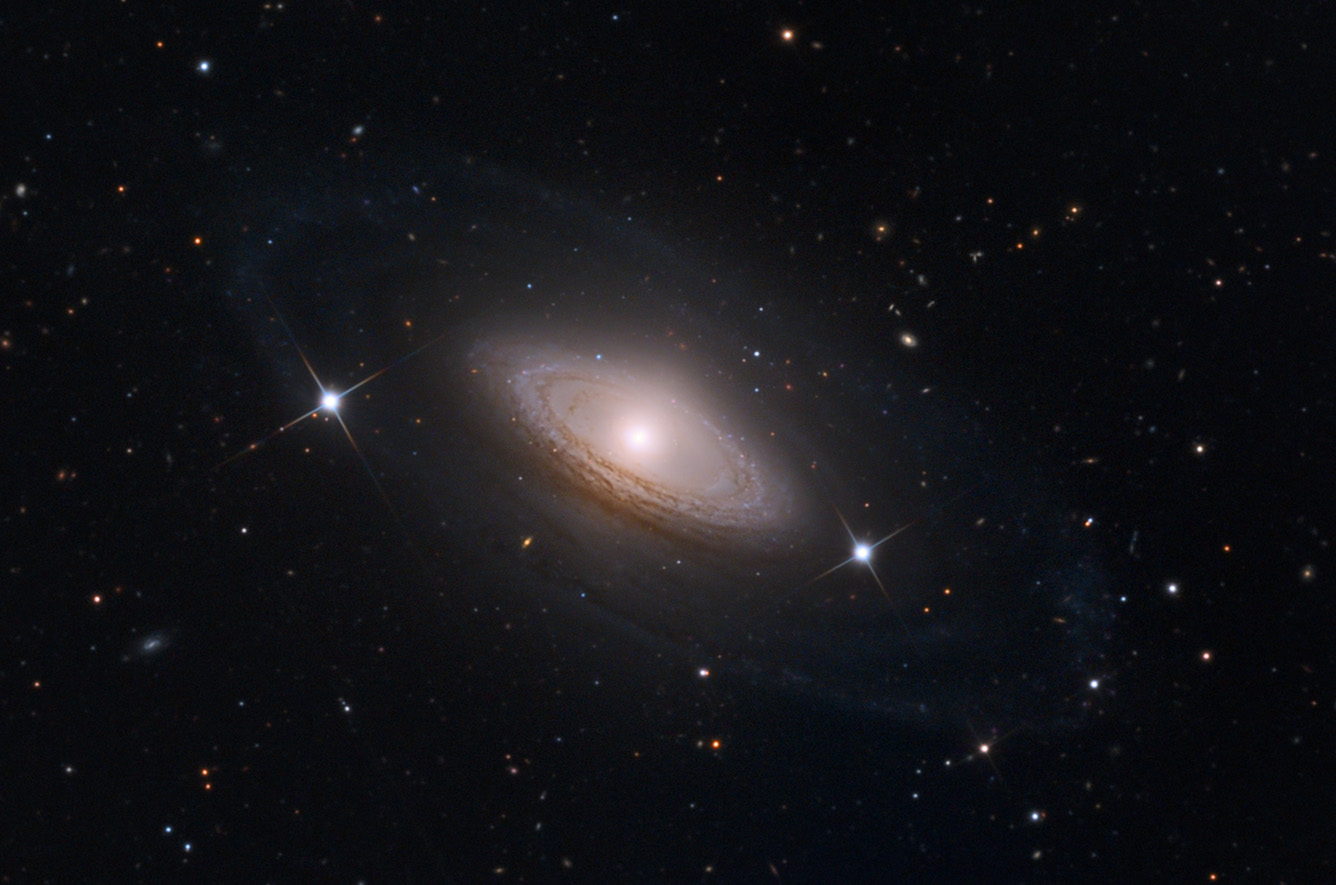
NGC 4698 imaged with the 32-inch Schulman Telescope at Mount Lemmon Observatory
