= 2011 CQ1 =

Apollo asteroid

2011 CQ_{1}
Discovery
- Discovered by: Catalina Sky Survey; Richard A. Kowalski
- Discovery date: 4 February 2011

Designations
- Minor planet category: Aten; NEO

Orbital characteristics
- Epoch 13 January 2016 (JD 2457400.5)
- Uncertainty parameter 5
- Observation arc: 12.4 hours (35 observations used)
- Aphelion: 1.0087 AU (150.90 Gm) (Q)
- Perihelion: 0.66454 AU (99.414 Gm) (q)
- Semi-major axis: 0.83661 AU (125.155 Gm) (a)
- Eccentricity: 0.20567 (e)
- Orbital period (sidereal): 0.77 yr (279.5 d)
- Mean anomaly: 18.607° (M)
- Mean motion: 1.2880°/day (n)
- Inclination: 5.2445° (i)
- Longitude of ascending node: 315.23° (Ω)
- Argument of perihelion: 335.40° (ω)
- Earth MOID: 0.000166307 AU (24,879.2 km)
- Jupiter MOID: 4.09715 AU (612.925 Gm)

Physical characteristics
- Dimensions: ~2 meters (79 in)
- Apparent magnitude: 14.2 (2011 peak)
- Absolute magnitude (H): 32.1

2011 CQ_{1} is a meteoroid discovered on 4 February 2011 by Richard A. Kowalski, at the Catalina Sky Survey. On the same day the meteoroid passed within 0.85 Earth radii (5,480 kilometers (3,410 mi) of Earth's surface, and was perturbed from the Apollo class to the Aten class of near-Earth objects. With a relative velocity of only 9.7 km/s, had the asteroid passed less than 0.5 Earth radii from Earth's surface, it would have fallen as a brilliant fireball. The meteoroid is between 80 centimeters (31 in) and 2.6 meters (100 in) wide. The meteoroid was removed from the Sentry Risk Table on 5 February 2011.

Parameter	Epoch	aphelion (Q)	perihelion (q)	Semi-major axis (a)	eccentricity (e)	Period (p)	inclination (i)	Longitude ascending node (Ω)	Mean anomaly (M)	Argument of perihelion (ω)
Units		AU				(days)	(°)			
Pre-flyby	2011-Jan-26	1.347	0.9096	1.128	0.1940	437.9	1.073°	135.4°	310.9°	58.59°
Post-flyby	2011-Feb-08	1.009	0.6624	0.8360	0.2076	279.2	5.296°	315.4°	220.6°	335.1°

It was not until 2020 QG on 16 August 2020 that a non-impacting closer approach to Earth was observed.

Animation of 2011 CQ_{1}'s orbit - 2011 flyby

Around the Sun

Around the Earth

Sun · 2011 CQ_{1} · Earth

== See also ==
Closest non-impacting asteroids to Earth, except Earth-grazing fireballs (using JPL SBDB numbers and Earth radius of 6,378 km)
Asteroid	Date	Distance from surface of Earth	Uncertainty in approach distance	Observation arc	Reference
2025 UC11	2025-10-30 12:11	237 km	±11 km	1 day (41 obs)	data
2020 VT4	2020-11-13 17:21	368 km	±11 km	5 days (34 obs)	data
2020 QG	2020-08-16 04:09	2939 km	±11 km	2 days (35 obs)	data
2021 UA1	2021-10-25 03:07	3049 km	±10 km	1 day (22 obs)	data
2023 BU	2023-01-27 00:29	3589 km	±<1 km	10 days (231 obs)	data
2011 CQ1	2011-02-04 19:39	5474 km	±5 km	1 day (35 obs)	data
2019 UN13	2019-10-31 14:45	6235 km	±189 km	1 day (16 obs)	data
2008 TS26	2008-10-09 03:30	6260 km	±970 km	1 day (19 obs)	data
2004 FU162	2004-03-31 15:35	6535 km	±13000 km	1 day (4 obs)	data
