= (468861) 2013 LU28 =

Trans-Neptunian object

(468861) 2013 LU_{28}
Discovery
- Discovered by: Mount Lemmon Srvy.
- Discovery site: Mount Lemon Obs.
- Discovery date: 8 June 2013

Designations
- Alternative designations: 2014 LJ_{9} · 2015 KB_{157}
- Minor planet category: TNO · centaur damocloid · distant

Orbital characteristics
- Epoch 9 June 2026 (JD 2461200.5)
- Uncertainty parameter 0
- Observation arc: 12.82 yr (4,684 d)
- Aphelion: 348.86 AU
- Perihelion: 8.748851AU
- Semi-major axis: 178.808 AU
- Eccentricity: 0.951071
- Orbital period (sidereal): 2433.62 yr
- Mean anomaly: 359.24°
- Mean motion: 0° 0^{m} 1.484^{s} / day
- Inclination: 125.309096°
- Longitude of ascending node: 276.050762°
- Argument of perihelion: 153.16585°
- Jupiter MOID: 3.87262 AU
- T_{Jupiter}: -2.065

Physical characteristics
- Mean diameter: 106 km (est.); 114 km (est.)
- Geometric albedo: 0.08 (est.); 0.09 (est.)
- Spectral type: Prominent water (H_{2}O/"bowl" type)
- Absolute magnitude (H): 8.21

(468861) 2013 LU_{28} is a highly eccentric trans-Neptunian object, retrograde centaur and damocloid from the outer regions of the Solar System. It was discovered on 8 June 2013 by astronomers with the Mount Lemmon Survey at the Mount Lemmon Observatory in Arizona, United States.

2013 LU_{28} is approximately 110 kilometers (68 miles) in diameter. It was numbered in 2016 and has not been named since.

== Discovery and naming ==
=== Discovery ===
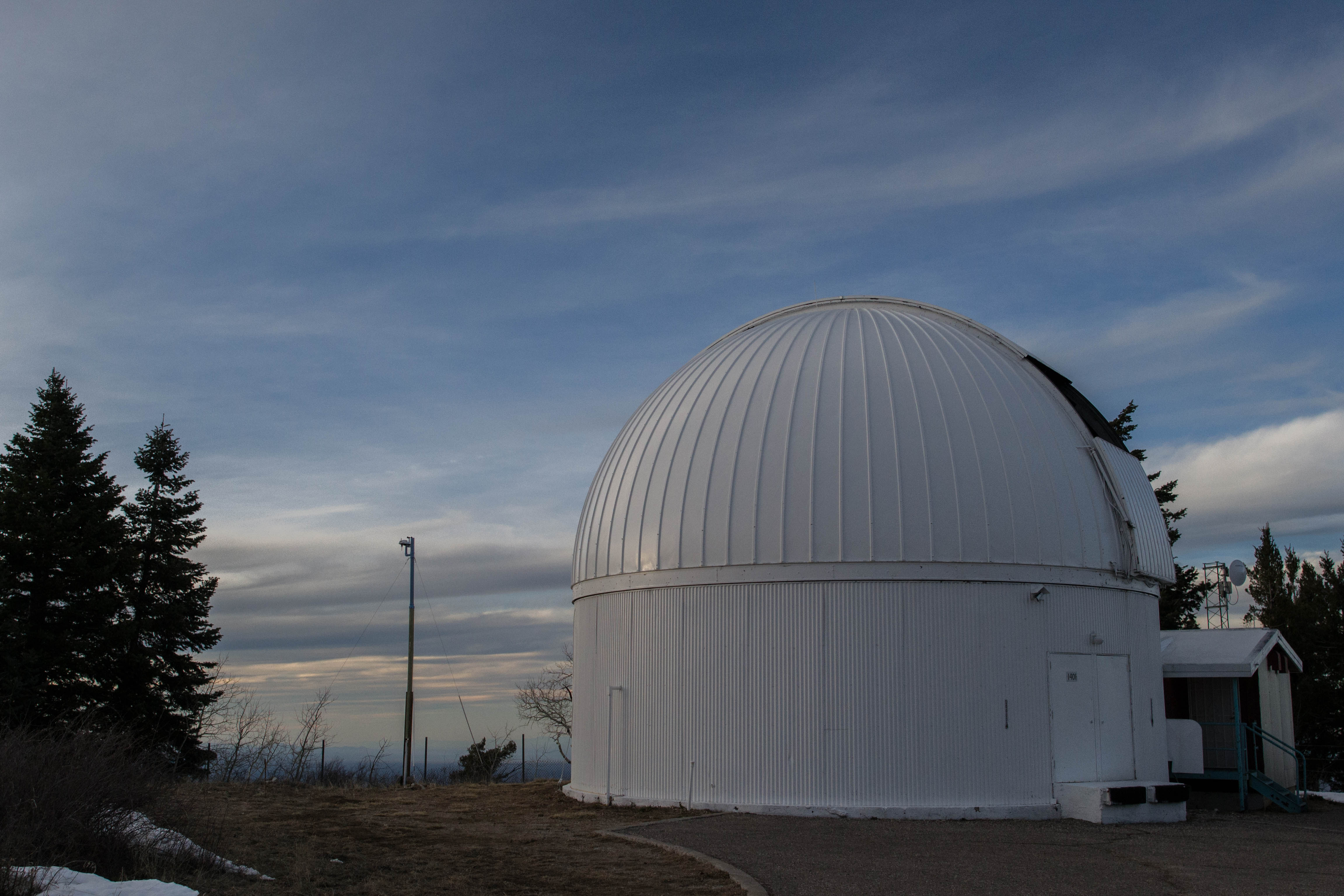
Mount Lemmon Survey

2013 LU_{28} was discovered on 8 June 2013 by astronomers with the Mount Lemmon Survey at the Mount Lemmon Observatory in Arizona, United States.

=== Naming and numbering ===
This distant minor planet was numbered by the Minor Planet Center on 20 June 2016 (M.P.C. 100585). As of 2025, it has not been named.

== Orbit and classification ==
2013 LU_{28} orbits the Sun at a distance of 8.7–353.1 AU once every 2434 years (888,879 days; semi-major axis of 180.92 AU). Its orbit has an exceptionally high eccentricity of 0.95 and an inclination of 125° with respect to the ecliptic. The body's observation arc begins with its official discovery observation at Mount Lemmon in June 2013.

=== TNO, centaur and damocloid ===
With a semi-major axis larger than that of Neptune, 2013 LU_{28} is generically classified as a trans-Neptunian object. It is also considered an (extended) centaur, due to its eccentric orbit with a low perihelion of 8.7 AU and a higher-than-90°-inclination, which gives it a retrograde orbit. There are only about a hundred known retrograde minor planets out of nearly 800,000 observed bodies, and, together with 2008 YB_{3} and 2011 MM4, it is among the largest such objects. 2013 LU_{28} also meets the orbital definition for being a damocloid, a cometary-like object without a coma or tail and a Tisserand's parameter with respect to Jupiter of less than 2 besides a retrograde orbit.

== Physical characteristics ==
=== Diameter and albedo ===
According to Johnston's Archive and astronomer Michael Brown, 2013 LU_{28} measures 106 and 114 kilometers in diameter, based on an absolute magnitude of 8.1 and an assumed albedo for the body's surface of 0.08 and 0.09, respectively. As of 2018, no physical characteristics have been determined from photometric observations. The body's rotation period, pole and shape remain unknown.

== Observations ==
On 12 April 2024, the James Webb Space Telescope (JWST) observed 2013 LU_{28} using its Mid-Infrared Instrument (MIRI). Published results are expected at a later date.

On 30 January 2025, 2013 LU_{28}'s shadow, cast by a magnitude 12 star (TYC 2449-01891-1), swept across the eastern US and central Europe. Out of 31 stations, 7 successfully observed the occultation, from which a 122.2 km x 105.0 km profile was derived.
