= 2021 UA1 =

Earth-crossing asteroid

2021 UA_{1}
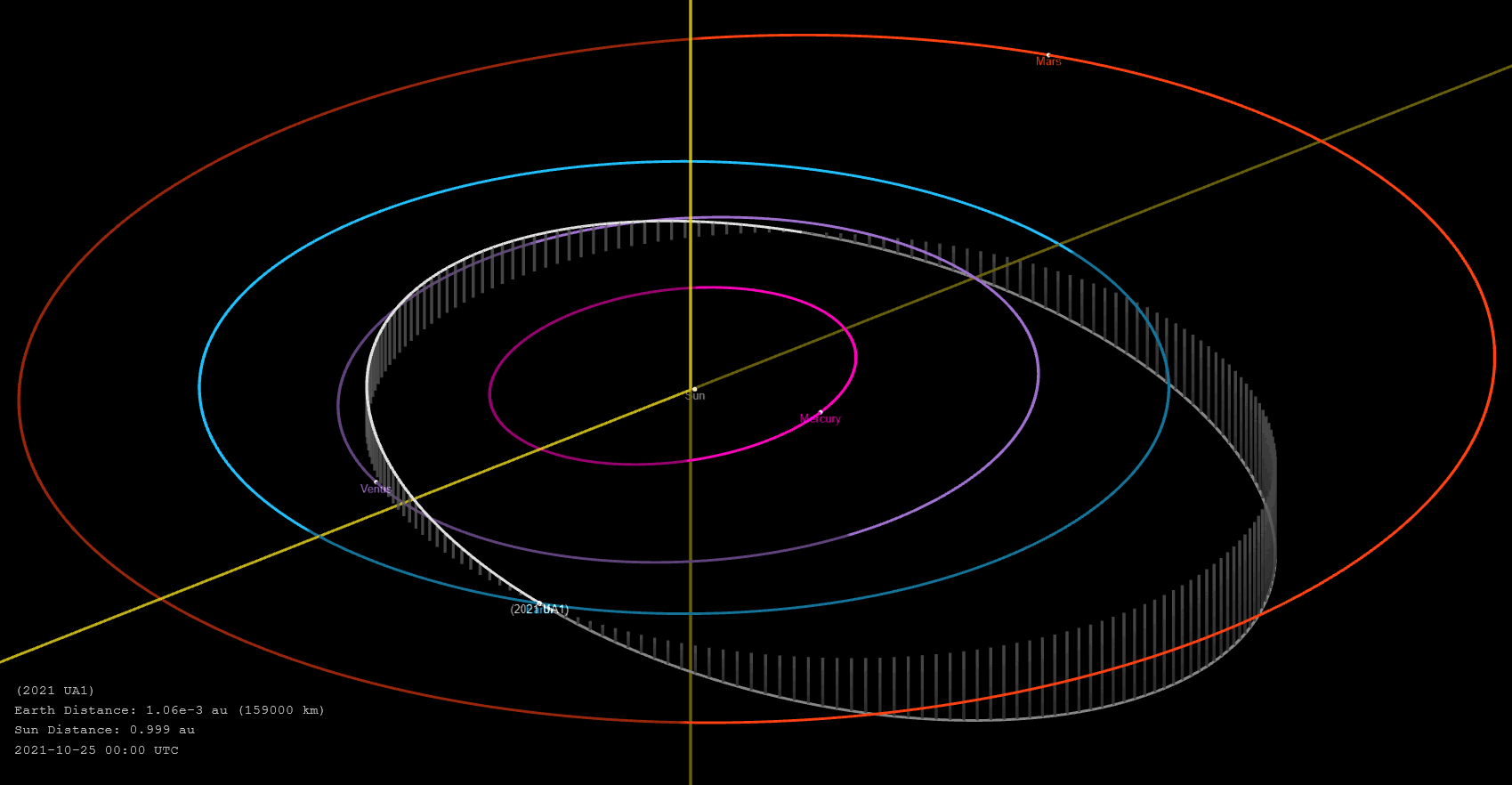
- Orbit of 2021 UA_{1}

Discovery
- Discovered by: Catalina Sky Survey
- Discovery date: 25 October 2021

Designations
- Minor planet category: NEO; Aten (pre-flyby); Apollo (post-flyby); risk listed

Orbital characteristics
- Epoch 2021-Jul-01 (JD 2459396.5)
- Uncertainty parameter 6
- Observation arc: 0.9 days
- Aphelion: 1.35 AU (Q)
- Perihelion: 0.6139 AU (q)
- Semi-major axis: 0.98 AU (a)
- Eccentricity: 0.3750 (e)
- Orbital period (sidereal): 0.97 years
- Mean anomaly: 312.8° (M)
- Inclination: 10.19° (i)
- Longitude of ascending node: 211.6° (Ω)
- Argument of perihelion: 66.27° (ω)
- Earth MOID: 0.000064 AU (9,600 km)
- Jupiter MOID: 3.7 AU (550,000,000 km)

Physical characteristics
- Dimensions: ~2 m (7 ft); 1–3 meters
- Absolute magnitude (H): 31.8

2021 UA_{1} is a small (~2 meter) near-Earth object that passed about 3047 km from the surface of Earth while passing over Antarctica on 25 October 2021 around 03:07 UT. (Note: Geocentric approach distance 0.000063 AU – 6378 km (Earth radius) is 3047 km. It passed within 4 degrees of the South celestial pole near closest approach.) Given the small size of the asteroid it only reached the brightness of Pluto at around apparent magnitude 14. Since it approached from the direction of the Sun, it was not discovered until 4 hours after closest approach.

Closest non-impacting asteroids to Earth, except Earth-grazing fireballs (using JPL SBDB numbers and Earth radius of 6,378 km)
Asteroid	Date	Distance from surface of Earth	Uncertainty in approach distance	Observation arc	Reference
2025 UC11	2025-10-30 12:11	237 km	±11 km	1 day (41 obs)	data
2020 VT4	2020-11-13 17:21	368 km	±11 km	5 days (34 obs)	data
2020 QG	2020-08-16 04:09	2939 km	±11 km	2 days (35 obs)	data
2021 UA1	2021-10-25 03:07	3049 km	±10 km	1 day (22 obs)	data
2023 BU	2023-01-27 00:29	3589 km	±<1 km	10 days (231 obs)	data
2011 CQ1	2011-02-04 19:39	5474 km	±5 km	1 day (35 obs)	data
2019 UN13	2019-10-31 14:45	6235 km	±189 km	1 day (16 obs)	data
2008 TS26	2008-10-09 03:30	6260 km	±970 km	1 day (19 obs)	data
2004 FU162	2004-03-31 15:35	6535 km	±13000 km	1 day (4 obs)	data

The 2021 Earth approach lifted the orbit and increased the orbital period from 356 days to 413 days. This changed it from an Aten asteroid to an Apollo asteroid.

Orbital Elements
Parameter	Epoch	Period (p)	Aphelion (Q)	Perihelion (q)	Semi-major axis (a)	Eccentricity (e)	Inclination (i)
Units		(days)	AU				(°)
Pre-flyby	2021-Jul-01	355.6	1.351	0.614	0.982	0.3750	10.19°
Post-flyby	2022-Jan-01	413.1	1.525	0.646	1.086	0.4046	0.006°

Animation of 2021 UA_{1}'s orbit around Sun - 2021 Earth approach 2021 UA_{1} · Mercury · Venus · Earth · Mars · Sun
