= (342842) 2008 YB3 =

Centaur

(342842) 2008 YB_{3}
Discovery
- Discovered by: Siding Spring Srvy.
- Discovery site: Siding Spring Obs.
- Discovery date: 18 December 2008

Designations
- Minor planet category: centaur · damocloid distant

Orbital characteristics
- Epoch 1 July 2021 (JD 2459396.5)
- Uncertainty parameter 1
- Observation arc: 11.78 yr (4,302 d)
- Aphelion: 16.698 AU
- Perihelion: 6.4673 AU
- Semi-major axis: 11.583 AU
- Eccentricity: 0.4417
- Orbital period (sidereal): 39.42 yr (14,399 d)
- Mean anomaly: 94.371°
- Mean motion: 0° 1^{m} 30^{s} / day
- Inclination: 105.06°
- Longitude of ascending node: 112.64°
- Argument of perihelion: 330.44°
- T_{Jupiter}: −0.2460

Physical characteristics
- Mean diameter: 67 km
- Synodic rotation period: n.a.
- Geometric albedo: 0.062
- Spectral type: BR; B–I = 1.750±0.01; B–R = 1.260±0.01; R–I = 0.490±0.01; V–R = 0.460±0.01
- Absolute magnitude (H): 9.3

(342842) 2008 YB_{3} is a sizable centaur and retrograde damocloid from the outer Solar System, approximately 67 kilometers (42 miles) in diameter. It was discovered on 18 December 2008, by astronomers with the Siding Spring Survey at the Siding Spring Observatory in Australia. The minor planet was numbered in 2012 and has since not been named.

== Orbit and classification ==
2008 YB_{3} orbits the Sun at a distance of 6.5–16.7 AU once every 39 years and 5 months (14,399 days; semi-major axis of 11.58 AU). Its orbit has an eccentricity of 0.44 and an inclination of 105° with respect to the ecliptic. The body's observation arc begins with its official discovery observation at Siding Spring in December 2008.

=== Retrograde centaur and damocloid ===
2008 YB_{3} is a member of the centaurs, a population of inward-moving bodies transiting from the Kuiper belt to the group of Jupiter-family comets. Orbiting mainly between Jupiter and Neptune, they typically have a semi-major axis of 5.5 to 30.1 AU. Centaurs are cometary-like bodies with an eccentric orbit. Their short dynamical lifetime is due to the perturbing forces exerted on them by the outer planets of the Solar System.

The object is on a retrograde orbit as it has an inclination of more than 90°. There are only about a hundred known retrograde minor planets out of nearly 800,000 observed bodies, and, together with 2013 LU_{28} and 2011 MM_{4}, it is among the largest such objects. The object also meets the orbital definition for being a damocloid. This is a small group of cometary-like objects without a coma or tail and a Tisserand's parameter with respect to Jupiter of less than 2 besides a retrograde orbit.

== Numbering and naming ==
This minor planet was numbered by the Minor Planet Center on 29 October 2012, receiving the number 342842 in the minor planet catalog (M.P.C. 80959). As of 2025, it has not been named. According to the established naming conventions, it will be named after one of the many centaurs from Greek mythology, which are creatures with the upper body of a human and the lower body and legs of a horse.

== Physical characteristics ==
2008 YB_{3} has an intermediate BR color, in between the BB ("grey-blue") and RR ("very red") color classes. Sheppard's obtained color indices: B–I (1.750), B–R (1.260), R–I (0.490) and V–R (0.460) agree with most other centaurs. The resulting B–V index is 0.8 (subtracting V–R from B–R).

=== Diameter and albedo ===
According to the survey of centaurs and scattered-disc objects carried out by the NEOWISE mission of NASA's Wide-field Infrared Survey Explorer, 2008 YB_{3} measures 67.1 kilometers (41.7 miles) in diameter and its surface has an albedo of 0.062, which makes it too small to be considered as a dwarf planet candidate.

=== Rotation period ===
As of 2021, no rotational lightcurve of has been obtained from photometric observations. The body's rotation period, pole and shape remain unknown.

== See also ==
- List of centaurs (small Solar System bodies) § 342842
