= 2004 FU162 =

Closest known Earth approach until 2008

2004 FU_{162}
Designations
- Minor planet category: Aten · NEO

Orbital characteristics
- Epoch 5 April 2004 (JD 2453100.5)
- Uncertainty parameter 9
- Observation arc: 44 minutes (Note: Observation arc: (31.30799 – 31.27744) * 24 hours * 60 minutes = 43.99 minutes) (only 4 observations)
- Aphelion: 1.1511 AU
- Perihelion: 0.5026 AU
- Semi-major axis: 0.8269 AU
- Eccentricity: 0.3922
- Orbital period (sidereal): 0.75 yr (275 days)
- Mean anomaly: 262.67°
- Mean motion: 1° 18^{m} 39.24^{s} / day
- Inclination: 4.1647°
- Longitude of ascending node: 191.25°
- Argument of perihelion: 139.78°
- Earth MOID: 0.0001 AU

Physical characteristics
- Dimensions: 4–12 meters (estimated)
- Absolute magnitude (H): 28.7

2004 FU_{162} is an Aten near-Earth asteroid less than 20 meters in diameter crudely estimated to have passed roughly 6500 km above the surface of Earth (Note: The asteroid passed about 12913±15000 km from the center of Earth and Earth has a radius of 6371 km.) on 31 March 2004.

It was only observed for 44 minutes on 31 March 2004, by the Lincoln Near-Earth Asteroid Research (LINEAR) team at Lincoln Laboratory's Experimental Test Site in Socorro, New Mexico, and remains a lost asteroid. The estimated 4 to 6 meter sized body made one of the closest known approaches to Earth.

== Description ==
On 31 March 2004, around 15:35 UTC, the asteroid is crudely estimated to have passed within approximately 1 Earth radius (R_{🜨}) or 6,400 kilometers of the surface of the Earth (or 2.02 R_{🜨} from Earth's center). But due to the very short observation arc, the uncertainty in the close approach distance is a large ±15000 km. By comparison, geostationary satellites orbit at 5.6 R_{🜨} and GPS satellites orbit at 3.17 R_{🜨} from the center of the Earth.

As of 2008 this was the third or fourth closest approach. The first observation of 2004 FU_{162} was not announced until 22 August 2004.

It was only observed four times in the space of 44 minutes and could not be followed up. Nevertheless, "the orbit is quite determinate and, given the exceptional nature of this close approach, the object is now receiving a designation". No precovery images have been found.

2004 FU_{162} is estimated to be approximately 6 meters in diameter. This means that it would burn up from atmospheric friction before striking the ground in the case of an Earth impact.

On 26 March 2010, it may have come within 0.0825 AU (12.3 million km) of Earth, but with an uncertainty parameter of 9, the orbit is poorly determined.

Another, larger near-Earth asteroid, 2004 FH passed just two weeks prior to 2004 FU_{162}.

A closer non-impacting approach to Earth was not known until 2008 TS_{26} on 9 October 2008.

== See also ==
Closest non-impacting asteroids to Earth, except Earth-grazing fireballs (using JPL SBDB numbers and Earth radius of 6,378 km)
Asteroid	Date	Distance from surface of Earth	Uncertainty in approach distance	Observation arc	Reference
2025 UC11	2025-10-30 12:11	237 km	±11 km	1 day (41 obs)	data
2020 VT4	2020-11-13 17:21	368 km	±11 km	5 days (34 obs)	data
2020 QG	2020-08-16 04:09	2939 km	±11 km	2 days (35 obs)	data
2021 UA1	2021-10-25 03:07	3049 km	±10 km	1 day (22 obs)	data
2023 BU	2023-01-27 00:29	3589 km	±<1 km	10 days (231 obs)	data
2011 CQ1	2011-02-04 19:39	5474 km	±5 km	1 day (35 obs)	data
2019 UN13	2019-10-31 14:45	6235 km	±189 km	1 day (16 obs)	data
2008 TS26	2008-10-09 03:30	6260 km	±970 km	1 day (19 obs)	data
2004 FU162	2004-03-31 15:35	6535 km	±13000 km	1 day (4 obs)	data
