= Cer-Vit =

Cer-vit is a family of glass-ceramic materials that were invented by Owens Illinois in the mid-1960s. Its principle ingredients are the oxides of lithium, aluminum and silicon. It is melted to form a glass which is then heat treated to nucleate and crystallize it into a material that is more than 90% microscopic crystals. Its formulation and heat treatment can be modified to produce a variety of material properties. One form is a material that is transparent and has a near zero thermal expansion. Its transparency is because the microscopic crystals are smaller than the wave length of light and are transparent, and its low thermal expansion is because they have a spodumene structure.

Cer-Vit C 101 was used to form large mirror blanks (158 inches (4,000 mm) in diameter) that were used in telescopes in several places, including South America, France and Australia. Owens Illinois ceased production of C101 in 1978. In addition, Cer-Vit materials were used to make stove tops, cook ware and aviation applications, but never commercialized.

Today, glass-ceramic products such as transparent mirror blanks and stove tops, and cookware are manufactured and in daily use. These products include trade names of Zerodor, Hercuvit, and Pyroceram, most of which have low or zero thermal expansion, which allows them to be exposed to rapid temperature changes or localized heating or cooling.

== Applications ==
At Mount Lemmon Observatory, two 1.5 meter diameter telescopes have a Cer-Vit glass mirror. One of the telescopes discovered 2011 AG5, an asteroid which achieved 1 on the Torino Scale.

== Bibliography ==
- Structure and Characterization of Lithiumaluminalsilicate Glass and Glass Ceramics derived from Spodumene Mineral. A. Nordman, Y Cheng, T.J. Bastock, Journal of Physics Condensed Matter, Volume 7, Number 16
- Glass-ceramics capture $2 million telescope-mirror contract. David H. Taeler, Ceramic Age, August 1968, Volume 84, Number 8
- Transparent Glass-Ceramics G. H. Beal, D. A. Duke, Journal of Materials Science 4(1969) 140-152
