= 2011 MM4 =

Centaur

2011 MM_{4}
Discovery
- Discovered by: Pan-STARRS 1
- Discovery site: Haleakala Obs.
- Discovery date: 24 June 2011

Designations
- Minor planet category: centaur · damocloid distant

Orbital characteristics
- Epoch 23 March 2018 (JD 2458200.5)
- Uncertainty parameter 0
- Observation arc: 6.99 yr (2,552 d)
- Aphelion: 31.121 AU
- Perihelion: 11.138 AU
- Semi-major axis: 21.129 AU
- Eccentricity: 0.4729
- Orbital period (sidereal): 97.12 yr (35,473 d)
- Mean anomaly: 49.176°
- Mean motion: 0° 0^{m} 36.36^{s} / day
- Inclination: 100.48°
- Longitude of ascending node: 282.45°
- Argument of perihelion: 6.86°
- T_{Jupiter}: −0.4

Physical characteristics
- Mean diameter: 64 km
- Geometric albedo: 0.083
- Absolute magnitude (H): 9.5

2011 MM_{4} is a sizable centaur and retrograde damocloid from the outer Solar System, approximately 64 kilometers (40 miles) in diameter. It was discovered on 24 June 2011, by astronomers with the Pan-STARRS 1 at the Haleakala Obs. in Hawaii.

== History ==
=== Discovery ===
2011 MM_{4} was discovered on 24 June 2011, by astronomers with the Pan-STARRS 1 at the Haleakala Obs. in Hawaii.

=== Naming and numbering ===
As of 2025, 2011 MM_{4} has not been numbered or named by the Minor Planet Center.

== Orbit and classification ==
2011 MM_{4} orbits the Sun at a distance of 11.1–31.2 AU once every 97 years and 2 months (35,473 days; semi-major axis of 21.13 AU). Its orbit has an eccentricity of 0.47 and an inclination of 100° with respect to the ecliptic. The body's observation arc begins at Pan-STARRS in June 2010.

=== Retrograde centaur and damocloid ===
2011 MM_{4} is a member of the centaurs, a population of inward-moving bodies transiting from the Kuiper belt to the group of Jupiter-family comets. Orbiting mainly between Jupiter and Neptune, they typically have a semi-major axis of 5.5 to 30.1 AU. Centaurs are cometary-like bodies with an eccentric orbit. Their short dynamical lifetime is due to the perturbing forces exerted on them by the outer planets of the Solar System.

The object is on a retrograde orbit as it has an inclination of more than 90°. There are only about a hundred known retrograde minor planets out of nearly 800,000 observed bodies, and, together with 2013 LU_{28} and 2008 YB_{3}, it is among the largest such objects. The object also meets the orbital definition for being a damocloid. This is a small group of cometary-like objects without a coma or tail and a Tisserand's parameter with respect to Jupiter of less than 2 besides a retrograde orbit.

== Physical characteristics ==
=== Diameter and albedo ===
According to the survey of centaurs and scattered-disk objects carried out by the NEOWISE mission of NASA's Wide-field Infrared Survey Explorer, 2011 MM_{4} measures 64 kilometers in diameter and its surface has an albedo of 0.083, which makes it too small to be considered as a dwarf-planet candidate.

=== Rotation period ===
As of 2021, no rotational lightcurve of has been obtained from photometric observations. The body's rotation period, pole and shape remain unknown.

== See also ==
- List of centaurs (small Solar System bodies) § 2011 MM4
