= Astronomy Camp =

Science summer camp in Arizona, U.S.

Astronomy Camp is a science summer camp hosted by the University of Arizona's Alumni Association, and run by astronomer Don McCarthy. Many of the early camps took place at the Mount Lemmon Station Observatory atop Mount Lemmon, near Tucson, Arizona. On Mount Lemmon, the campers have access to a 12-inch (30 cm), 20-inch, 40-inch and 60-inch telescope, and on the nearby Mount Bigelow site, a 61-inch (150 cm) telescope.

In recent years, the camp has also taken place at the Kitt Peak National Observatory, where the students have access to a wide variety of telescopes, including the 90-inch (230 cm) Bok Telescope, the ARO 12m Radio Telescope, and a variety of smaller instruments.

At both locations, the telescopes and other equipment are used for hands-on learning and research on a variety of astronomical topics. Campers are encouraged to propose their own projects and collect the data necessary to answer their research questions.

Don McCarthy won the American Astronomical Society Education Prize in 2012 in part for his work running Astronomy Camp.

== Location ==
- Mount Lemmon observatory: 32°26′32″N 110°47′20″W
- Kitt Peak observatory: 31°57′36″N 111°35′55″W
