= Catalina Station =

Astronomical observatory (1963–)

- Alternative names: Steward Observatory Catalina Station
- Organization: Steward Observatory
- Observatory code: 693
- Location: Mount Bigelow, Arizona
- Coordinates: 32.4168°N 110.7326°W
- Altitude: 2,518 meters (8,261 ft)
- Established: 1963
- Website: Steward Observatory

Telescopes
- Kuiper Telescope: 1.54 m (61 in) reflector
- Schmidt camera: 0.68 m (27 in) reflector

Catalina Station (CS), also known as Steward Observatory Catalina Station, is an astronomical observing facility located on Mount Bigelow in the Santa Catalina Mountains approximately 29 kilometers (18 miles) northeast of Tucson, Arizona. The site in the Coronado National Forest is used with special permission from the United States Forest Service (USFS) by the Steward Observatory of the University of Arizona.

== History ==
The Catalina Station site was selected by Gerard P. Kuiper of the Lunar and Planetary Laboratory (LPL) at the University of Arizona in 1960. He believed that a slightly higher location than an alternate site at Kitt Peak National Observatory would be better for LPL's purposes, and Mt. Bigelow was both higher and easily accessible from the University of Arizona via the Catalina Highway. Construction began in late 1962 and the first telescope, a 21-inch reflector, began operating in early 1963. At this time the site was known as Catalina Observatory. The first telescope was at CS Site I, and later in 1963 a 28-inch telescope opened at CS Site II, about 0.5 km (0.31 miles) to the southeast. In 1965 a 61-inch telescope was opened at Site I, followed by two similar 60-inch telescopes at Site II shortly thereafter. In 1969 a 40-inch reflector was erected near Site II, adjacent to a FAA transmitter. As a condition for occupying the Mount Lemmon Observatory (MLO) site, the USFS required LPL to vacate Site II, which was completed in 1972. The 40-inch telescope remained until 1975, when it too was moved to Mount Lemmon Observatory. In 1972, a 28-inch Schmidt camera replaced the 21-inch reflector. The 61-inch Kuiper and the Schmidt camera continue to be used, though they have been upgraded several times. In 1978, the site was transferred from the Lunar and Planetary Laboratory to the Steward Observatory. In 1989, it was first referred to as the Catalina Site, and later became known as the Catalina Station.

== Telescopes ==
- The 1.54 m (61 in) Kuiper Telescope, previously known as the NASA Telescope, was built in 1965. It is a Cassegrain design with two different secondary mirrors available. It is one of the telescopes used by students at Astronomy Camp.
- The 0.68 m (27 in)/0.76 m (30 in) Schmidt camera was installed at CS in 1972. It was first used by the Catalina Sky Survey in 1998, and was completely overhauled in 2003, changing its original optical specifications significantly.

=== Former telescopes ===
- A 0.54 m (21 in) reflecting telescope was installed in 1963 and was replaced in 1972 by the Schmidt camera.
- A 0.7 m (28 in) reflecting telescope was installed in 1963 and moved to the Mount Lemmon Observatory in 1972.
- A 1.52 m (60 in) reflecting telescope, sometimes also referred to as the NASA Telescope, was built in the late 1960s. It was moved to the Mount Lemmon Observatory in 1972 and is known as the Steward Observatory Telescope.
- A 1.52 m (60 in) aluminium-mirror reflecting telescope built in the late 1960s was moved to National Astronomical Observatory of Mexico in the Sierra de San Pedro Mártir in 1970.
- A 1.02 meters (40 in) reflecting telescope was built in 1969 and moved to the Mount Lemmon Observatory in 1975.

== See also ==
- List of astronomical observatories
