= Dynamical lifetime =

In statistical orbital mechanics, a body's dynamical lifetime refers to the mean time that a small body can be expected to remain in its current mean motion resonance. Classic examples are comets and asteroids which evolve from the 7:3 resonance to the 5:2 resonance with Jupiter's orbit with dynamical lifetimes of 1-100 Ma.
