= Mount Lemmon Observatory =

Astronomical observatory in Arizona, United States

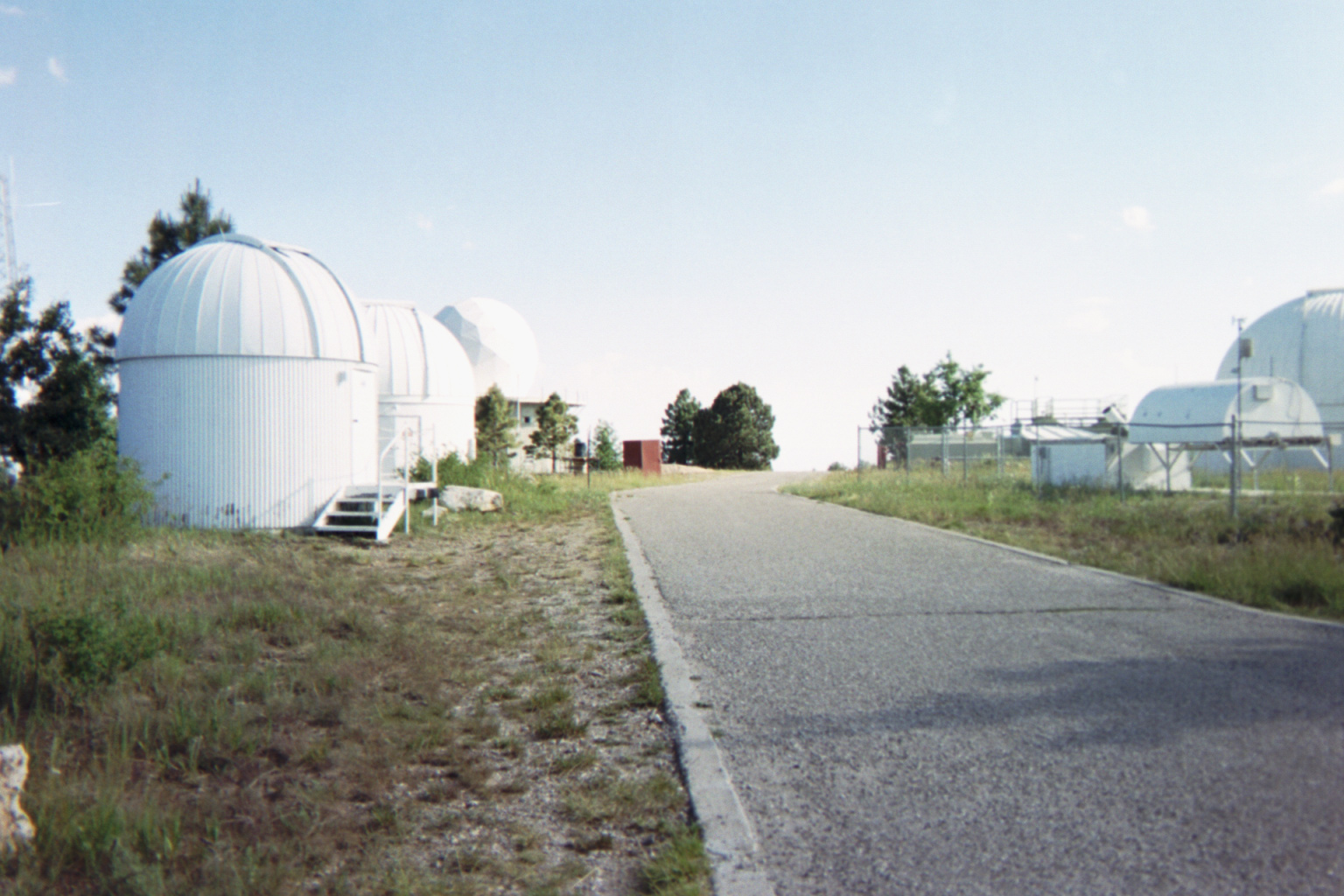
- View of the telescopes on Mount Lemmon
- Alternative names: MLO
- Organization: Steward Observatory
- Observatory code: G84
- Location: Mount Lemmon, Arizona
- Coordinates: 32.4420°N 110.7893°W
- Altitude: 2,791 meters (9,157 ft)
- Established: 1970
- Website: Steward Observatory

Telescopes
- Steward Observatory Telescope: 1.5 m reflector
- UMN MLOF telescope: 1.5 m reflector
- CSS telescope: 1.0 m reflector
- KASI telescope: 1.0 m reflector
- Related media on Commons

Mount Lemmon Observatory (MLO), also known as the Mount Lemmon Infrared Observatory, is an astronomical observatory located on Mount Lemmon in the Santa Catalina Mountains approximately 28 kilometers (17 miles) northeast of Tucson, Arizona (US). The site in the Coronado National Forest is used with special permission from the U.S. Forest Service by the University of Arizona's Steward Observatory, and contains a number of independently managed telescopes.

== History ==
The MLO site was first developed in 1954 as Mount Lemmon Air Force Station, a radar installation of the Air Defense Command. Upon transfer to the Steward Observatory 1970, the site was converted to an infrared observatory. Until 2003, a radar tower operated from Fort Huachuca was used to track launches from the White Sands Missile Range in New Mexico and Vandenberg Air Force Base in California.

== Telescopes ==
Below are the 8 telescopes currently operating at the observatory.

- The 1.52 m (60 in) Steward Observatory Telescope is a Cassegrain reflector used for the Mount Lemmon Survey (MLS), which is part of the Catalina Sky Survey (CSS). It was built in the late 1960s and first installed at Catalina Station on Mount Bigelow, which is nearby in the Santa Catalina Mountains. It was moved to Mt. Lemmon in 1972, and then re-housed in its current location in 1975. Its original metal primary mirror performed poorly and was replaced in 1977 with a glass mirror made of Cer-Vit. It is one of the telescopes used by students at Astronomy Camp. It discovered 2011 AG5, an asteroid which achieved 1 on the Torino Scale.
- The 1.52 m (60 in) UMN-MLOF (University of Minnesota Mount Lemmon Observing Facility) telescope began operating in 1970. It is a Dall-Kirkham optical/near infrared and is of the same general design as the 1.5 m Steward telescope and another at San Pedro Mártir. The original metal mirror performed poorly and was replaced with a Cer-Vit mirror in 1974. The University of California, San Diego (UCSD) was originally a partner of UMN in operating the telescope.
- The 1.02 m (40 in) CSS (Catalina Sky Survey) reflecting telescope is an unusual Pressman-Camichel design and is used to provide automated follow up observations of newly discovered near-Earth objects. It was originally located at Catalina Station and was moved to MLO in 1975. It was refurbished in 2008 and placed in a new dome in 2009 before being integrated into CSS operations.
- The 1.0 m (39 in) KASI robotic telescope was installed in 2003 and is the only instrument of the Mt. Lemmon Optical Astronomy Observatory (LOAO) operated by the Korea Astronomy and Space Science Institute (KASI).

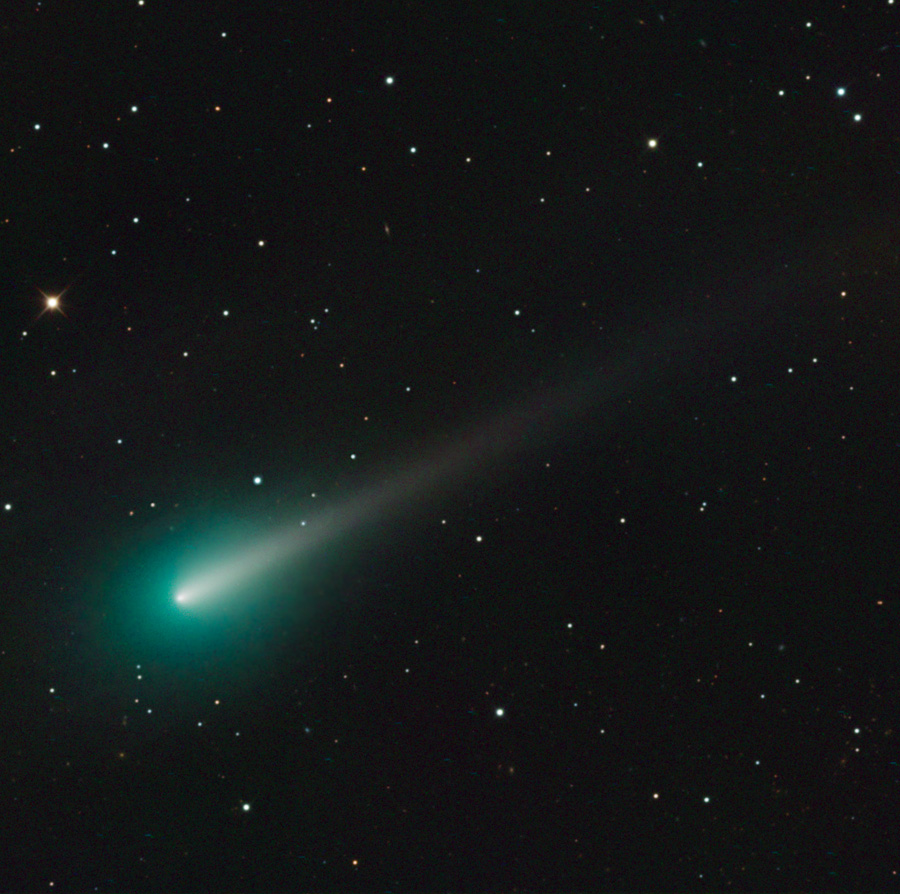
Comet ISON (C/2012 S1) as seen on October 8, 2013 with the Schulman Telescope (recorded with STX-16803 CCD camera)

- The 0.81 m (32 in) Schulman Telescope is a Ritchey-Chrétien reflector built by RC Optical Systems and installed in September 2010. It is operated by the Mount Lemmon SkyCenter and is Arizona's largest dedicated public observatory. The Schulman Telescope was designed from inception for remote control over the internet by amateur and professional astrophotographers worldwide, and is currently the world's largest telescope dedicated for this purpose.
- A 0.7 m (28 in) reflecting telescope installed in 1963 at Catalina Station was moved to MLO in 1972.
- A 0.6 m (24 in) Ritchey-Chrétien reflector was built by RC Optical Systems and is operated by the Mount Lemmon SkyCenter.
- The University of Louisville Manner Telescope, a 0.6 m (24 in) Ritchey-Chrétien reflector built by RC Optical Systems, remotely operated for high precision photometry including exoplanet candidate confirmation and characterization for NASA TESS.
- The 0.5 m (20 in) John Jamieson Telescope was donated to UA in 1999 and dedicated in 2005. It is optimized for near infrared observing and is operated by the Mount Lemmon SkyCenter.

== See also ==
- Catalina Station
- Kitt Peak National Observatory
- List of astronomical observatories
