= 2025 UC11 =

Aten meteoroid and near-Earth object

2025 UC_{11}
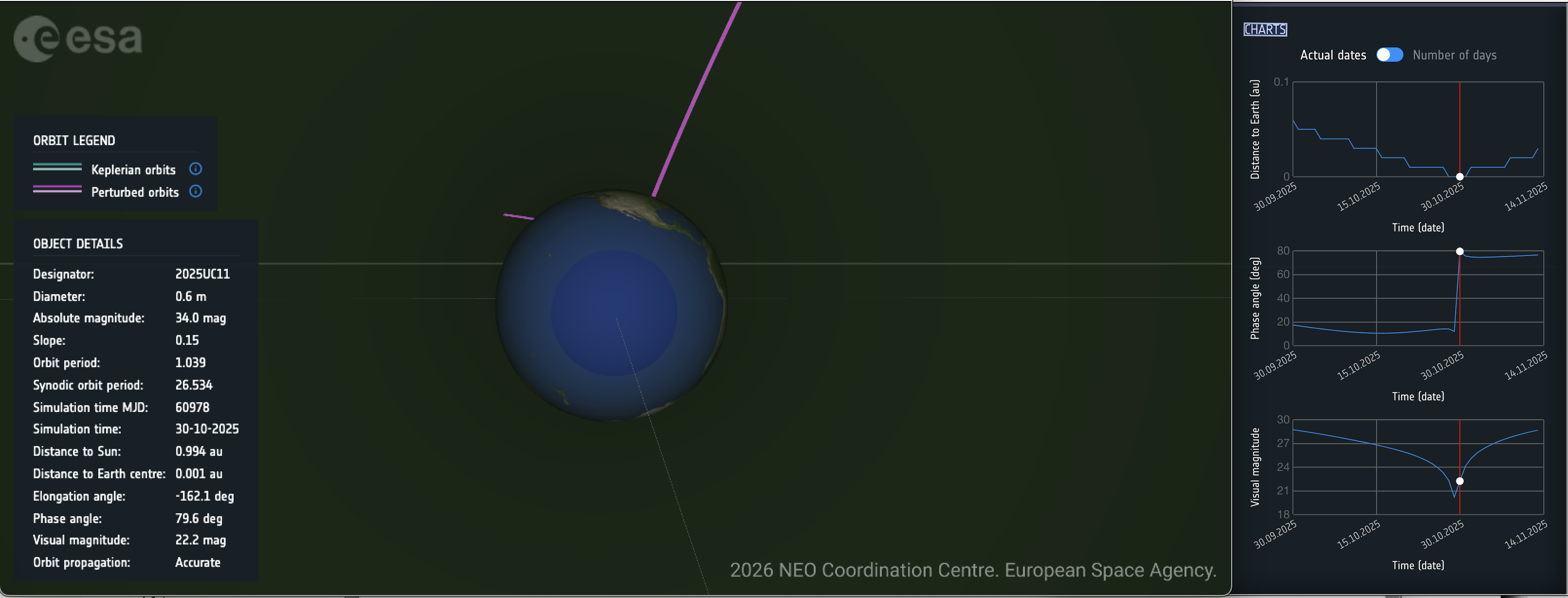
- Orbital diagram of 2025 UC_{11} at the sub-perigee zenith point above the South Pacific, 12:11 UTC on 30 October 2025 (Courtesy European Space Agency - ESA)

Discovery
- Discovered by: JPL SynTrack Robotic Telescope: SRO #1
- Discovery site: Sierra Remote Observatories, Auberry, California
- Discovery date: 30 October 2025

Designations
- Designation: 2025 UC_{11}
- Alternative names: ST25J47 (local)
- Minor planet category: NEO • Aten meteoroid

Orbital characteristics
- Epoch 21 November 2025 (JD 2461000.5)
- Uncertainty parameter 4
- Observation arc: 1 day
- Aphelion: .995
- Perihelion: .897
- Semi-major axis: 0.946 AU
- Eccentricity: 0.05199
- Orbital period (sidereal): 336 days (0.92 years)
- Mean anomaly: 186.48°
- Mean motion: 1.0715°/day
- Inclination: 5.114°
- Longitude of ascending node: 36.31°
- Time of perihelion: ≈ 1 May 2026
- Argument of perihelion: 195.59°
- Earth MOID: 0.000275535 AU
- Mercury MOID: 0.43 AU
- Venus MOID: 0.18 AU

Physical characteristics
- Mean diameter: 0.41 m - 0.93 m
- Apparent magnitude: 31.5 (on 22 December 2025)
- Absolute magnitude (H): 34.06

2025 UC_{11} is an Aten meteoroid and near-Earth object that is the closest and smallest known flyby to date to have been tracked with modern telescopes. (Note: The term flyby has no universally accepted parameter for closeness to Earth, but here refers to any object passing within one lunar distance of our planet. In absolute terms, the smallest-ever observed object is 2015 FF415, which passed more distantly than 2025 UC_{11} (within 35,000 kilometers of our planet). 2015 FF_{415} is recognized by an MPC circular (one telescope's observations) but, slightly apocryphally, does not show up in any other database. Smaller objects than 2025 UC_{11} that go unobserved approach our planet continually.) 2025 UC_{11} reached perigee on 30 October 2025 at 12:11 UTC. Visualizations from the European Space Agency's Synodic Orbital Viewer Tool show that its sub-perigee zenith point was somewhere deep over the South Pacific Ocean, approaching Point Nemo. It descended to an altitude 4,101 miles from Earth's center (approximately 142 to 152 miles from the Earth's surface).

The Minor Planet Center listed 2025 UC_{11} at 20:57 UTC in Electronic Circular #2025-U298 on the same date as its closest approach.

== Size ==
Based upon calculations using an absolute magnitude (H) of 34.06, 2025 UC_{11}'s range of diameters is within the range defining a meteoroid; that is, the minimum and maximum of its diameter (0.41 m–0.93 m) are both less than 1 meter. (Note: The diameter range is calculated using the standard NASA/JPL size equation: $\log_{10}(d) = 3.1236 - 0.5 \log_{10}(p_v) - 0.2H$, where $d$ is the diameter in kilometers, $H$ is the absolute magnitude, and $p_v$ is the geometric albedo. Given $H$ of 2025 UC_{11}$= 34.06$: For a high albedo ($p_v = 0.25$): $\log_{10}(d) = 3.1236 - 0.5 \log_{10}(0.25) - 0.2(34.06) \approx -3.3854$, yielding $d \approx 0.000412\text{ km}$ (0.41 m).; For a low albedo ($p_v = 0.05$): $\log_{10}(d) = 3.1236 - 0.5 \log_{10}(0.05) - 0.2(34.06) \approx -3.0349$, yielding $d \approx 0.000923\text{ km}$ (0.92 m, or up to 0.93 m when accounting for corrections in solar flux constants).; This mathematical variance demonstrates that regardless of surface composition, the entire diameter remains safely under the 1-meter threshold defining a meteoroid.)

== Closeness of approach ==
The fact that 2025 UC_{11} approached Earth 90 miles more closely than 2020 VT4, which passed within 4,191 miles from Earth's center on 13 November 2020, differentiates this near-Earth object as having the closest approach to Earth that was simultaneously tracked with modern telescopes, and that did not result in it burning up in the atmosphere or impacting the Earth.

2025 UC_{11} approached Earth from a distance of between 80 and 90 miles above the Kármán Line, which defines the lower part of the Earth's thermosphere, 100 kilometers (62 miles) above mean sea level.

If 2025 UC_{11} had not re-emerged back into solar orbit after its near encounter with Earth, it most likely would not have impacted but rather would have vaporized after burning up in the atmosphere due to its small size.

The observation and tracking of 2025 UC_{11} at such a near distance from Earth signal astronomers' improving ability to monitor increasingly small near-Earth objects. While it is still exceedingly difficult to provide advance warning of objects of this size before they approach Earth very closely, in previous years it would have been difficult to track them at all.

== Initial discovery and observation ==
Close approach time lapse animation of 2025 UC_{11} (1 second = ~1 hour)

Michael Shao, Navtej Singh, and Russell Trahan, while operating the JPL SynTrack Robotic Telescope at the Sierra Remote Observatories, Auberry, California, made the first discovery observation of 2025 UC_{11} on 30 October 2025, at 05:13 UTC (9:13 pm local Pacific time), some seven hours before it would reach its closest point to Earth. The astronomers assigned it the local designation ST25J47.

On 30 October 2025 at 20:57 UTC, after 11 additional observatories contributed measurements, and roughly 16 hours after the Sierra Remote Observatories provided the earliest discovery observation, the Minor Planet Center confirmed the object as a new minor planet on its website in Electronic Circular #2025-U298 and gave the object the provisional designation 2025 UC_{11}, thus informing the public of the discovery.

2025 UC_{11} has subsequently been included in the Sormano Astronomical Observatory APEC list, a catalogue of 420 asteroids since 1900 that were very large or had very close encounters with Earth within ~1 lunar distance.

== Data from other observatories ==
The Minor Planet Center circular and an associated update list 12 separate observatories that tracked this near-Earth object, including Cerro Tololo Inter-American Observatory in Chile, Palomar Mountain Observatory, and Tenerife Observatory. In Europe, 2025 UC_{11} was spotted by the Meerkat alert system.

== Ephemerides ==
2025 UC_{11} has up-to-date ephemerides, based on the orbital elements that were calculated during its most recent close approach. While this can contribute toward a well-understood orbit, data from future oppositions are required for more accurate knowledge of an object's position over time. The quality of that data, however, may be degraded for dim objects. This object will not be as close in future approaches to Earth, and thus it will be dimmer and more challenging to observe during these subsequent approaches.

== Orbit and classification ==
=== Orbital elements ===
2025 UC_{11} is currently on an Earth-crossing Aten-type orbit with an orbital semi-major axis of 0.945847 AU (141 million km; 87.9 million mi) and an orbital period of 0.92 years or 336 days. With a nominal perihelion distance of 0.897 AU and an aphelion distance of 0.9950 AU, 2025 UC_{11}'s orbit can cross the orbital path of Earth, resulting in occasional close passes with our planet. The nominal minimum orbit intersection distances (MOID) with Jupiter and Earth are approximately 3.9695 AU (593,830,000 km; 368,990,000 mi) and .0003 AU (45,000 km; 28,000 mi), respectively. 2025 UC_{11} has an orbital eccentricity of 0.052 and an inclination of 5.1 degrees to the ecliptic.

Synodic orbital path of 2025 UC_{11} following the motion of Earth about the Sun with the object's relative trajectory moving around it in 3D from 14 Oct 2025 to 5 Nov 2025. Courtesy: European Space Agency - ESA

Before the Earth encounter on 30 October 2020, 2025 UC_{11} had an Apollo-type orbit, also crossing the path of Earth. It had a perihelion distance of 0.920 AU and a semi-major axis of 1.079 AU (161 million km; 100 million mi), with an orbital period of 1.12 years or 409 days. The orbit had an orbital eccentricity of 0.147 and an inclination of 1.24 degrees to the ecliptic.

Orbital simulations from the JPL Horizons application show that since the year 1600 A.D., 2025 UC_{11} has not appeared to cross the orbital path of any other planet in the solar system, except Earth, nor is it expected to encounter the orbital path of any other planet by 2200 A.D., notwithstanding the changes in its orbital characteristics since encountering near-Earth orbit.

Orbital Elements
Parameter	Epoch	Period (p)	Aphelion (Q)	Perihelion (q)	Semi-major axis (a)	Eccentricity (e)	Inclination (i)
Units		(days)	AU			Unitless 0<=e<=1	(°)
Pre-flyby	2025-Mar-31	409.1	1.238	0.920	1.079	0.147	1.24°
Post-flyby	2025-Nov-21	335.99	0.995	0.897	0.946	0.052	5.11°

While 2025 UC_{11}'s orbit would meet the criteria of a potentially hazardous object, it would need to be significantly more massive to qualify as potentially hazardous. 2025 UC_{11} is not a threat to Earth.

=== Type of orbit ===
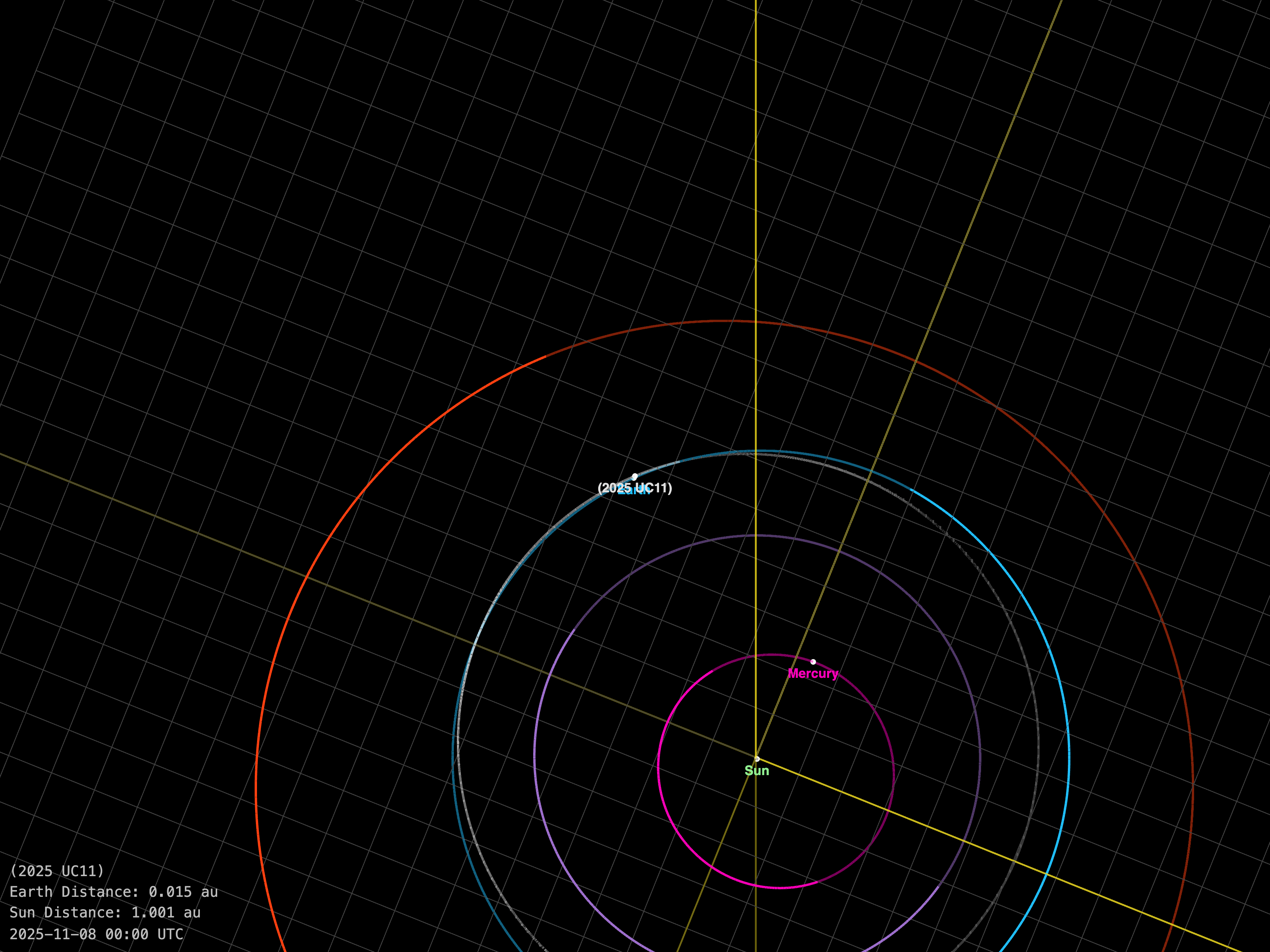
Orbit of 2025 UC_{11} from above at 0.015 AU from Earth. (Courtesy NASA/JPL-Caltech)

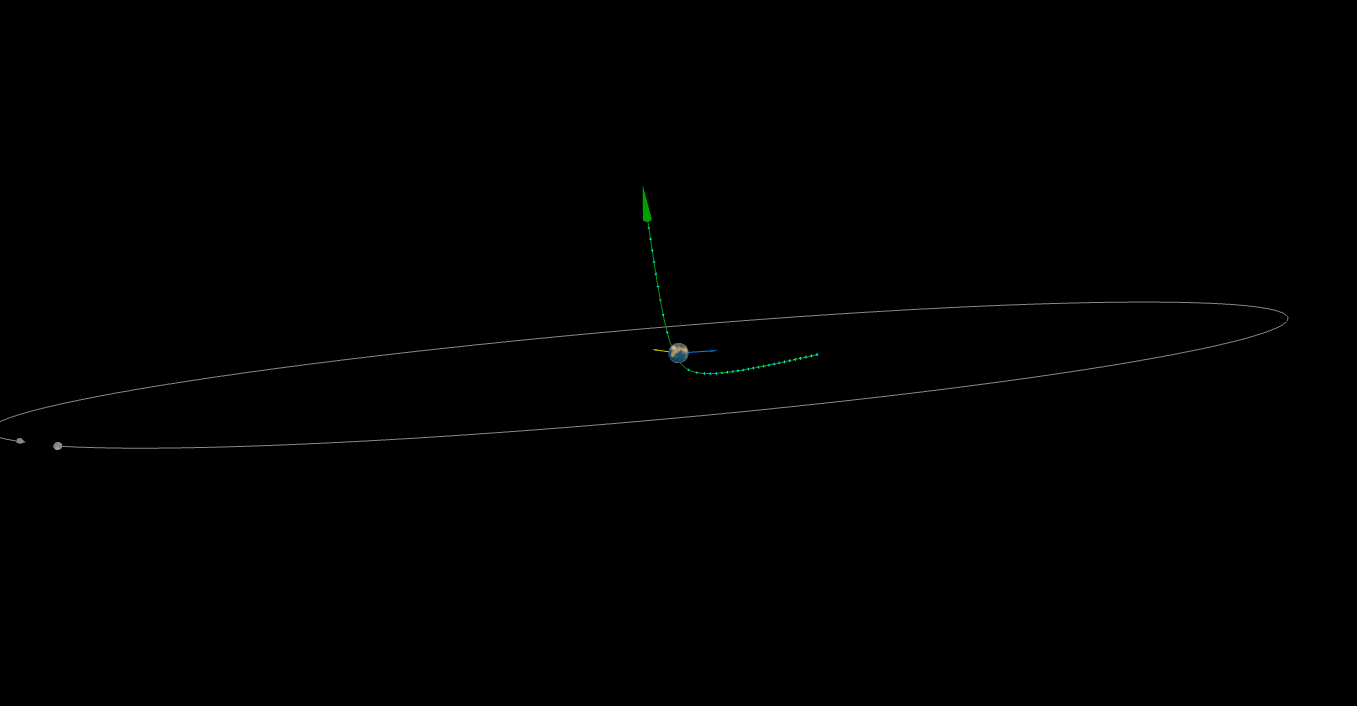
Orbital flyby diagram of 2025 UC_{11} (image provided by the International Astronomical Union's Minor Planet Center)

2025 UC_{11} belongs to the Aten-type of orbital subgroups. This can be known from observing the values in the table above. An object of Aten-type orbit must satisfy two requirements. First, it must have an average distance from the Sun that is less than that of Earth. Second, it must cross Earth's orbit. The first characteristic can be ascertained by looking at the sidereal orbital period of 2025 UC_{11}. After it approached Earth in 2025, its period shifted from 409.1 years to 335.99 years. By Kepler's third law, any period shorter than one Earth year must have an average distance from the Sun that is less than that of Earth.

To know whether 2025 UC_{11} crosses Earth's orbital path, despite the length of its orbital period, one must ascertain whether its farthest distance from the sun, its aphelion, is greater than Earth's closest distance from the Sun, its perihelion, since this would indicate an intersection of the Earth's orbital path by an object that spent some, or even perhaps most, of the distance it traveled around the Sun while inside Earth's orbit.

2025 UC_{11}'s aphelion is 0.995 AU. Earth's perihelion is 0.983 AU. Therefore, 2025 UC_{11}'s farthest distance from the sun is greater than Earth's closest distance from the Sun. 2025 UC_{11} intersects the orbital path of the Earth.

Thus, 2025 UC_{11} satisfies both the requirements needed to have an Aten-type orbit.

== Discovery methods ==
Astronomers at the Sierra Remote Observatories, with the aid of the JPL Syntrack Robotic Telescope, used synthetic tracking to plot the orbit of 2025 UC_{11}. In an academic report, they describe synthetic tracking and its significance to the process of discovering tiny near-Earth objects such as 2025 UC_{11}: Small objects "require closer proximity to Earth to be sufficiently bright for observation." However, small objects that have now become close enough to observe have a "faster motion rate" relative to the observer than they had when they were farther away, thus making them very challenging to identify.

The astronomers, therefore, describe "a potent technique for observing fast-moving near-Earth objects (NEOs), offering enhanced detection sensitivity and astrometric accuracy by avoiding trailing loss." Trailing loss occurs in traditional long-exposure astrophotography when fast-moving near-Earth objects (NEOs) appear as faint streaks rather than bright points, making them difficult to detect against background noise.

Synthetic tracking alleviates many problems of background noise by taking multiple short exposures and computationally stacking them to align the image of the moving object, concentrating its light and improving the ability to discover fainter, smaller NEOs. The accuracy of the results is, according to the study authors, comparable with the results obtained from stellar astrometry. This ability to stack, or "integrate" the images "empowers small telescopes to detect faint objects, a feat unattainable without this technique."

Early synthetic tracking prior to 2014 focused mainly on KBOs (Kuiper belt objects) and bodies at or beyond the orbit of Uranus, rather than near-Earth objects. Since then, observatories have been using the techniques more widely to detect challenging and faint near-Earth objects such as 2025 UC_{11}.
