= Bienor =

Bienor may refer to:

- Bienor (mythology), name of four characters in Greek mythology
- 54598 Bienor, an asteroid

== See also ==
- Bianor (disambiguation)
