= 54598 Bienor =

Elongated centaur

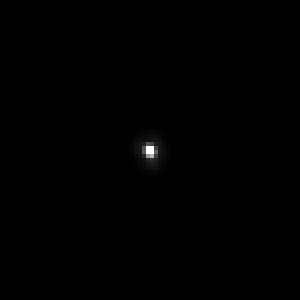
- Bienor imaged by the Hubble Space Telescope on 3 September 2005

Discovery
- Discovered by: Deep Ecliptic Survey
- Discovery site: Cerro Tololo Obs.
- Discovery date: 27 August 2000

Designations
- Pronunciation: /baɪˈiːnɔːr/
- Named after: Bienor
- Alternative designations: 2000 QC_{243}
- Minor planet category: centaur · distant

Orbital characteristics
- Epoch 5 May 2025 (JD 2460800.5)
- Uncertainty parameter 0
- Observation arc: 72.28 yr (26,401 d)
- Aphelion: 19.995 AU
- Perihelion: 13.192 AU
- Semi-major axis: 16.594 AU
- Eccentricity: 0.2050
- Orbital period (sidereal): 67.60 yr (24,690 days)
- Mean anomaly: 345.994°
- Mean motion: 0° 0^{m} 52.491^{s} / day
- Inclination: 20.727°
- Longitude of ascending node: 337.791°
- Time of perihelion: 21 December 2027
- Argument of perihelion: 152.290°
- Known satellites: 0
- Saturn MOID: 4.066 AU
- Uranus MOID: 0.638 AU

Physical characteristics
- Dimensions: (254±10) × (110±8) × (90±8) km (Note: Rizos et al. (2024) originally give Bienor's ellipsoid dimensions in terms of a, b, c semi-axes (radius for each orthogonal direction).)
- Mean diameter: 179–184 ± 6 km (radiometric area equivalent) (Note: The area-equivalent diameter of 179–184 ± 6 km was radiometrically measured from Herschel Space Observatory and Atacama Large Millimeter Array observations of Bienor's thermal radiation in 2011 and 2016.); 158±16 km (calculated area equivalent) (Note: The area-equivalent diameter of 158±16 km was calculated from the projected surface area of Bienor in 2011 and 2016, using the dimensions of 254 × 110 × 90 km in Rizos et al. (2024). It does not match the radiometrically measured area-equivalent diameter of 179–184 ± 6 km; this could be either due to shape irregularities, surface albedo variation, or an unknown natural satellite.)
- Mean density: 0.55–1.15 g/cm^{3}
- Sidereal rotation period: 9.1736±0.0002 h
- Axial tilt: 30°±3° wrt ecliptic (Note: The axial tilt or obliquity i with respect to the ecliptic can be obtained from ecliptic latitude via subtracting from the ecliptic north pole (+90°): $i = 90 -\beta$. β is the ecliptic latitude of Bienor's north pole direction, in degrees.)
- Pole ecliptic longitude: 35°±8°
- Pole ecliptic latitude: 50°±3°
- Geometric albedo: 0.065±0.005
- Spectral type: BR (TNO color class); B−V = 0.70±0.02; V−R = 0.47±0.02; V−I = 0.92±0.04
- Apparent magnitude: ~19
- Absolute magnitude (H): 7.47±0.04 (2016 average) (Note: Due to Bienor's elongated shape, its apparent and absolute magnitude can vary by 0.3 magnitudes as it rotates over time. Additionally, Bienor's absolute magnitude has been observed to gradually change over timescales of years. Observations from 2016 measure a rotationally averaged absolute magnitude of 7.47±0.04.)

54598 Bienor (provisional designation 2000 QC_{243}) is a centaur orbiting the Sun between Saturn and Uranus in the outer Solar System. Named after the mythological centaur Bienor, it was discovered on 27 August 2000 by the Deep Ecliptic Survey at Cerro Tololo Inter-American Observatory in Chile. Bienor has a highly elongated shape that spans up to 254 km (158 mi) across its longest dimension to 90 km (56 mi) across its shortest. It is one of the largest centaurs with a known size and is the fourth centaur whose stellar occultation was detected by multiple people simultaneously, after 10199 Chariklo, 2060 Chiron, and (95626) 2002 GZ32.

Like other centaurs, Bienor is believed to have originated from the region beyond Neptune in the outer Solar System, where the trans-Neptunian objects reside. The present-day orbit of Bienor is strongly influenced by the gravity of the giant planets, which makes it unstable and subject to ejection within a few million years. Observations have shown that the surface of Bienor is dark, colored gray, and contains some water ice, with potentially large amounts of organic compounds. Bienor's brightness periodically fluctuates as it rotates every 9.17 hours, although it exhibits several unusual behaviors such as gradual brightening in absolute magnitude (intrinsic brightness), which are less easily explained. The unusual behavior of Bienor's brightness alongside other anomalies such as radiometric overestimates of Bienor's diameter have led some astronomers to hypothesize that Bienor might either have an icy ring system, a natural satellite, or albedo variations across its surface.

== History ==
=== Discovery ===
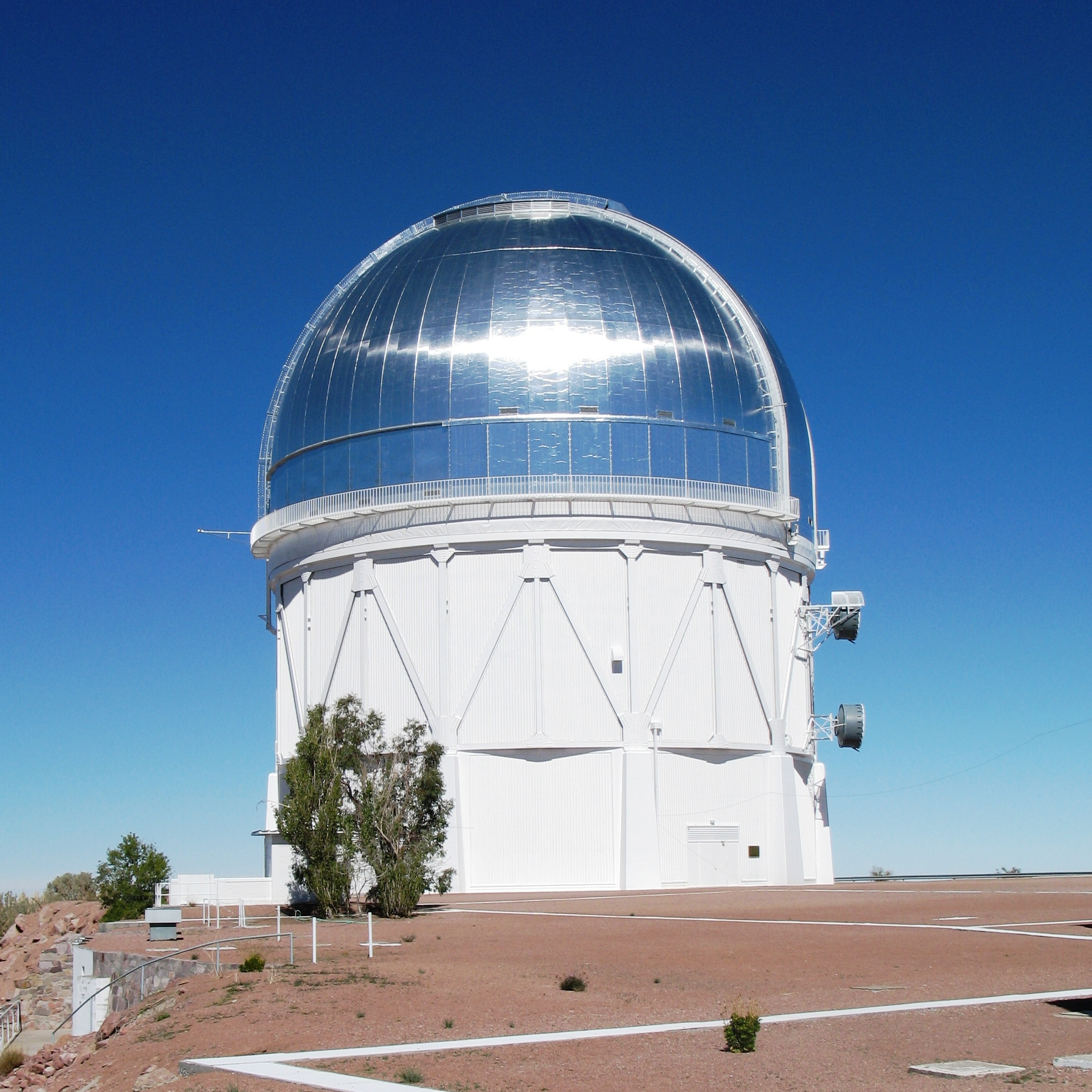
The Víctor M. Blanco Telescope at Cerro Tololo Observatory, which discovered Bienor in 2000

Bienor was discovered on 27 August 2000 by the Deep Ecliptic Survey (DES), an astronomical survey led by astronomers Marc W. Buie, Susan D. Kern, Robert ("Bob") L. Millis, Lawrence H. Wasserman, Eugene I. Chiang, Jessica Lovering, James L. Elliot, Karen J. Meech, David E. Trilling, R. Mark Wagner, and Kelly B. Clancy. The DES operated during 1998–2005 with the goal of finding faint trans-Neptunian objects in the ecliptic region of the sky. One of the telescopes used for the DES was the 4.0-meter Víctor M. Blanco Telescope at Cerro Tololo Inter-American Observatory in Chile, which made the discovery observations of Bienor. Bienor was one of the few objects discovered by the DES whose orbits lay between Jupiter and Neptune. The discovery of Bienor was announced by the Minor Planet Center (MPC) on 14 October 2000, after the object was reobserved from Lowell Observatory earlier in that month. Since then, several precovery observations of Bienor have been identified, with the earliest set of observations coming from Palomar Observatory's digitally archived photographs from 12 January 1953.

=== Name and number ===
The object is named after the centaur Bienor from Greek mythology. This follows the official astronomical naming convention where centaurs in the Solar System are named after centaurs from mythology. In Greek myth, Bienor was one of the centaurs who attempted to kidnap Pirithous's bride Hippodamia at her wedding, but was killed by the hero Theseus. The name was suggested by Elaine K. Elliot, the wife of DES team member James ("Jim") Elliot. The naming of this object was announced by the International Astronomical Union's Minor Planet Center on 7 January 2004.

Before Bienor was officially named, it was known by its provisional designation 2000 QC_{243}, which indicates the year and half-month of the object's discovery date. Bienor's minor planet catalog number of 54598 was given by the Minor Planet Center on 16 February 2003.

== Orbit ==
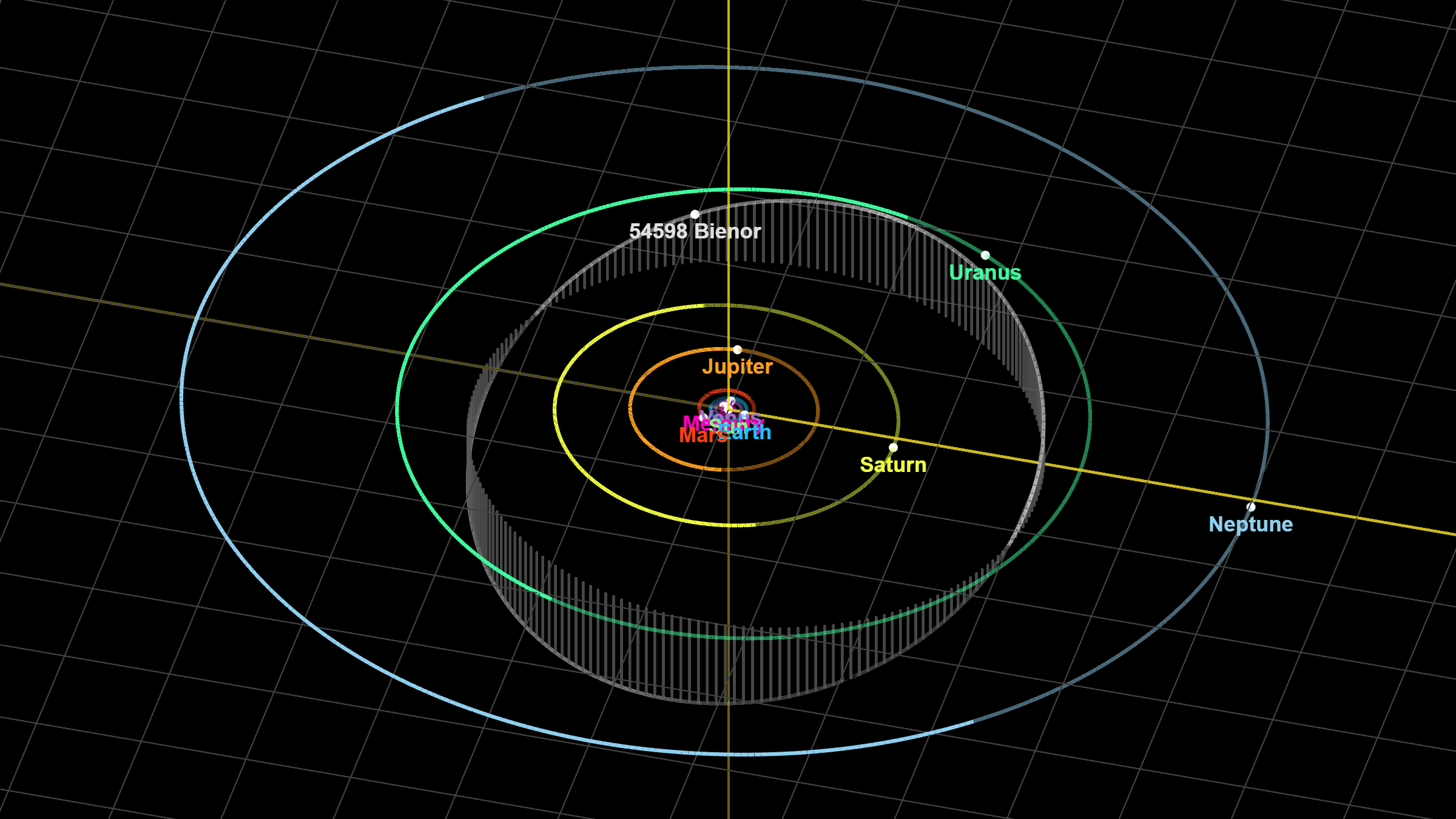
Diagram showing the orbit of Bienor with the outer planets

Bienor orbits the Sun between Saturn and Uranus with an average orbital distance of 16.6 astronomical units (AU) and an orbital period of 67.6 years. It follows an elliptical orbit that brings the object within 13.2 AU from the Sun at perihelion to as far as 20.0 AU at aphelion—slightly crossing outside the orbit of Uranus. The orbit of Bienor is inclined 20.7° with respect to the Earth's orbital plane (also known as the ecliptic). Bienor seems to be in a 5:4 mean-motion orbital resonance with Uranus. If confirmed, this resonance would not last longer than a million years because the resonance is destabilized by the gravitational perturbations of other planets.

Bienor is classified as a centaur, a type of small Solar System body generally (Note: There is no universally agreed definition of a centaur, as different researchers have argued for using different criteria (see Centaur (small Solar System body)#Discrepant criteria). Regardless, centaurs are broadly cited as orbiting between Jupiter and Neptune.) defined as orbiting between Jupiter and Neptune and sharing features of both asteroids and comets. Centaurs are believed to have originated from the region beyond Neptune (which includes the Kuiper belt and scattered disk), but were gravitationally scattered closer to the Sun due to close encounters with the giant planets, mostly with Neptune. The centaurs are still heavily influenced by the giant planets' gravitational perturbations, which makes their orbits unstable and susceptible to ejection within a few million years. This suggests that the current population of centaurs, including Bienor, entered the Solar System within Neptune's orbit recently in the past few million years.

== Observation ==
=== Visual ===
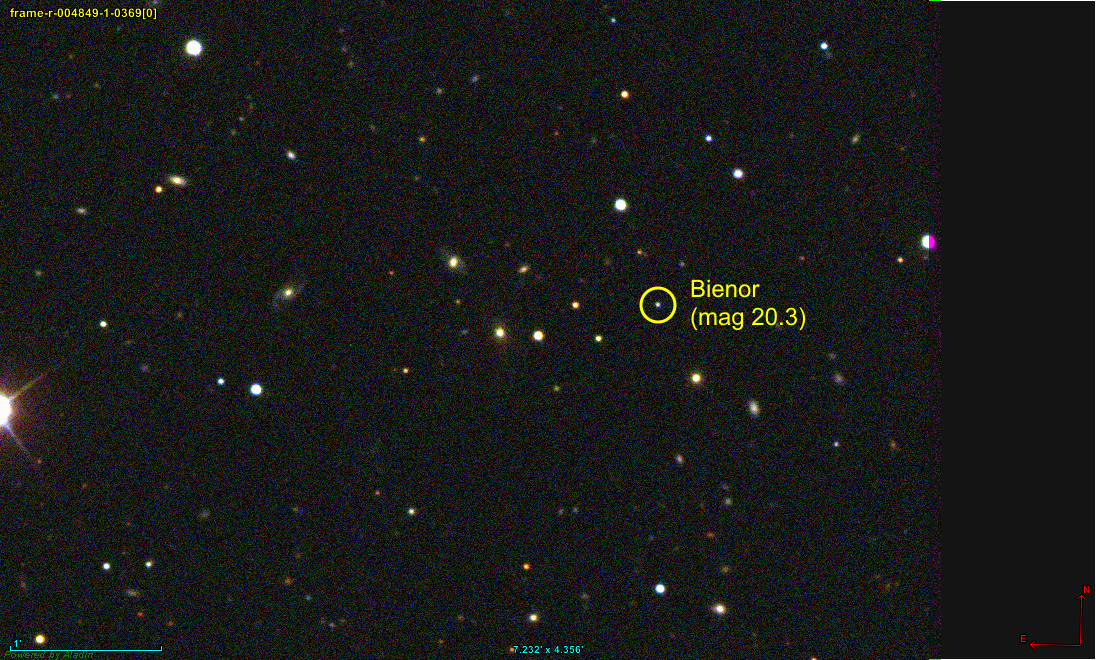
Bienor (circled) photographed by the Sloan Digital Sky Survey at Apache Point Observatory on 22 September 2004

As of 2025, Bienor is located in the northern celestial hemisphere of the sky (Note: The northern celestial hemisphere includes any part of the sky that has a declination greater than 0° (positive). The declination of Bienor's location in the sky is positive as of 2025, and will slowly change due to its slow orbital motion.) with a current apparent magnitude of around 19. Its apparent magnitude depends on its distance from Earth, approaching 18 at perihelion to nearly 21 at aphelion. As of 2025, Bienor has been observed for over 72 years—longer than its orbital period.

Bienor's intrinsic brightness, or absolute magnitude, has been observed to vary on short timescales of hours due to the rotation of Bienor's elongated shape, and on long timescales of years for less clear reasons. From 2001 to 2016, Bienor's rotationally averaged absolute magnitude brightened from 8.1 to 7.4—the exact cause of this unknown, though possible explanations include either a bright spot on Bienor's surface or a ring system orbiting it. Both scenarios invoke a gradual appearance due to the changing viewing angle of Bienor from Earth during this time interval.

=== Occultations ===
While moving across the sky, Bienor may serendipitously occult a background star—passing in front of the star and briefly blocking out its light from Earth. Observing stellar occultations by Bienor can provide accurate measurements for its position, shape, size, and can potentially uncover rings or natural satellites, although predicting occultations requires extensive astrometry from observational campaigns beforehand. The first positive detection of an occultation by Bienor was reported by a single person on 29 December 2017. The first Bienor occultation that was simultaneously detected by multiple people occurred on 11 January 2019, which involved eight different telescope locations in Portugal and Spain (with four of them detecting the occultation). Bienor was the fourth centaur whose stellar occultation has been positively detected by multiple people simultaneously, after 10199 Chariklo, 2060 Chiron, and (95626) 2002 GZ32. More stellar occultations by Bienor were observed by multiple people in 2022, 2023, and 2024.

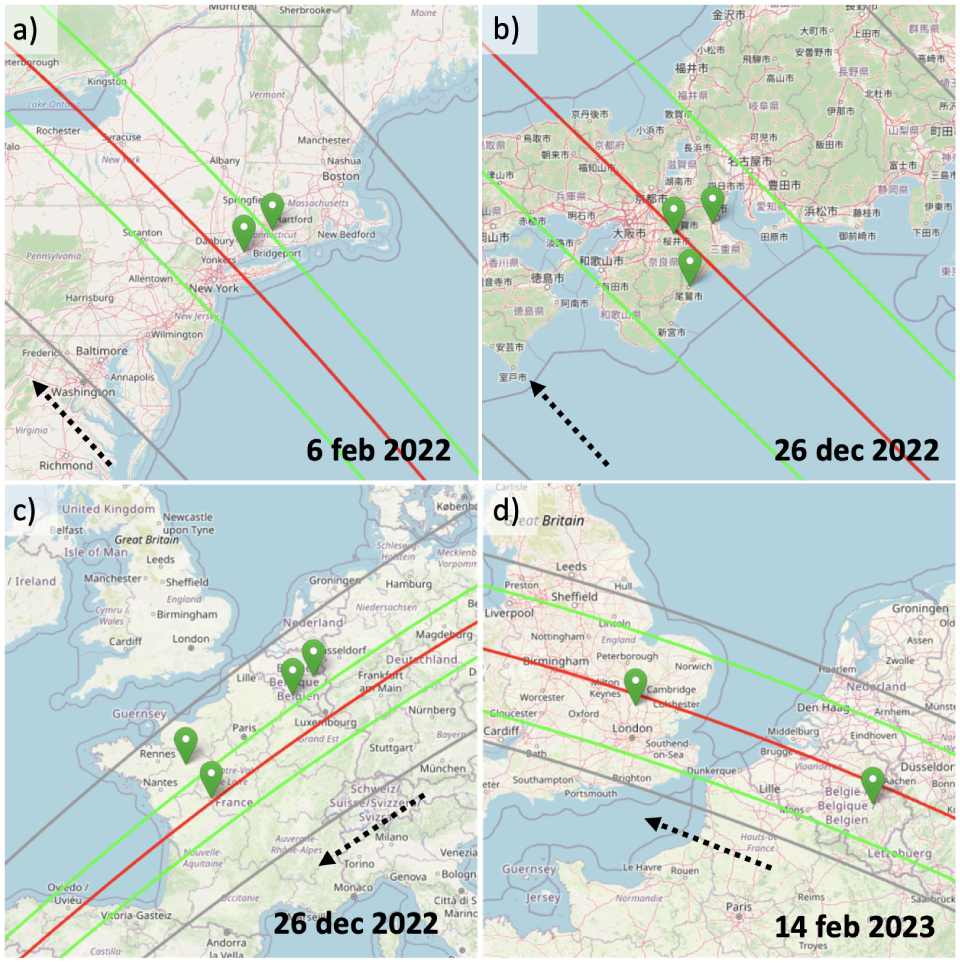
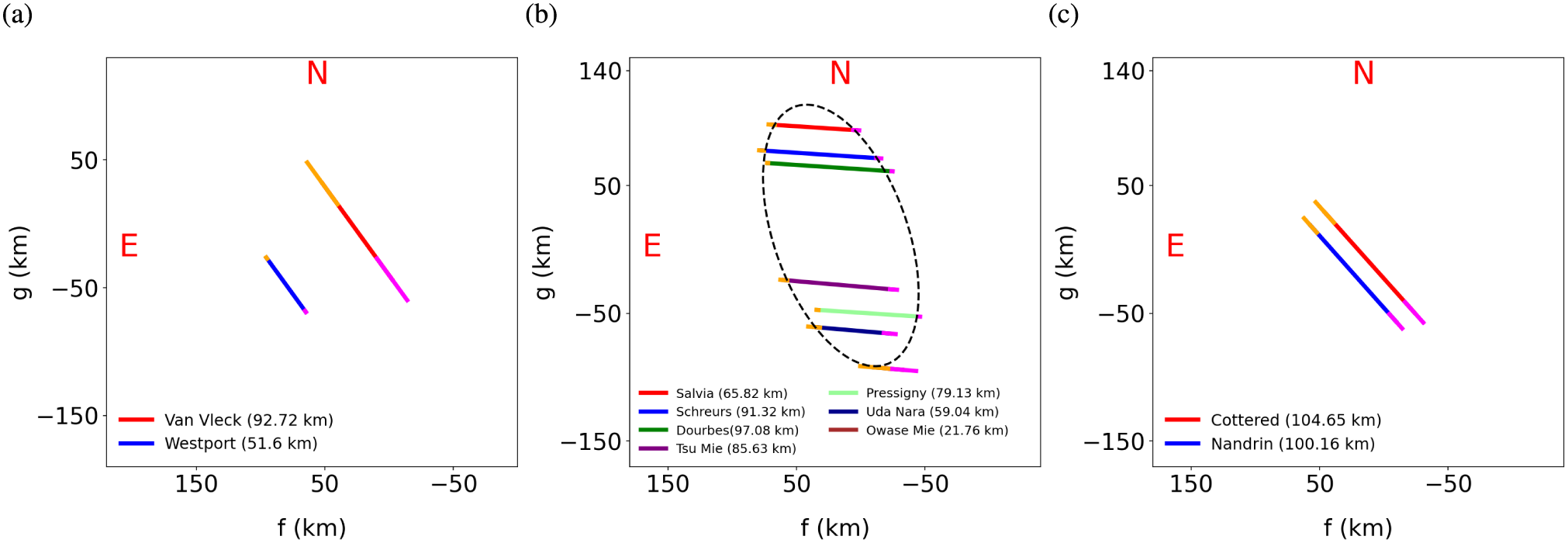
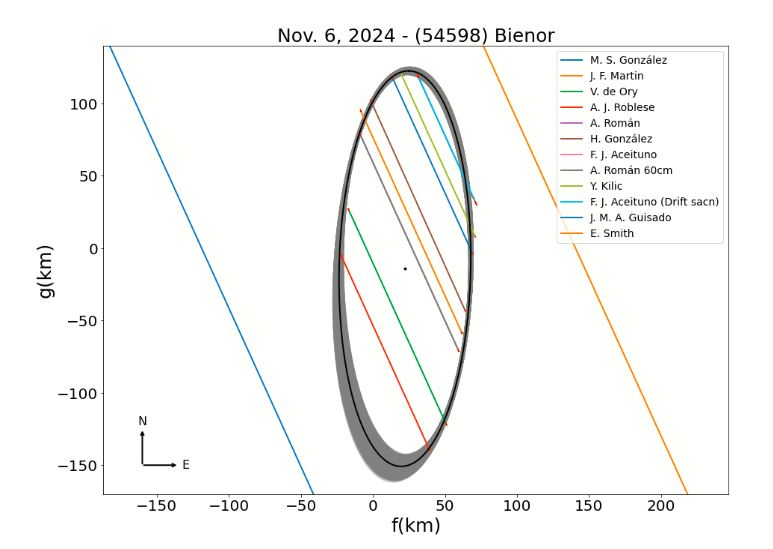
Left: When Bienor occulted a star on 6 February 2022 (a), 26 December 2022 (b and c), and 14 February 2023 (d), it cast a shadow over populated regions like the East Coast of the United States (a), Japan (b), and Western Europe (c and d). People located in the path of Bienor's shadow were able to observe the object occulting the star.
Middle: Silhouettes of Bienor constructed from stellar occultation detections (chords) on 6 Feb 2022 (a; left), 26 December 2022 (b; middle), 14 February 2023 (c; right). The large number of chords on 26 December 2022 reveals the elongated shape of Bienor.
Right: Silhouette of Bienor constructed from occultation chords on 6 November 2024

== Physical characteristics ==
=== Size, shape, and density ===
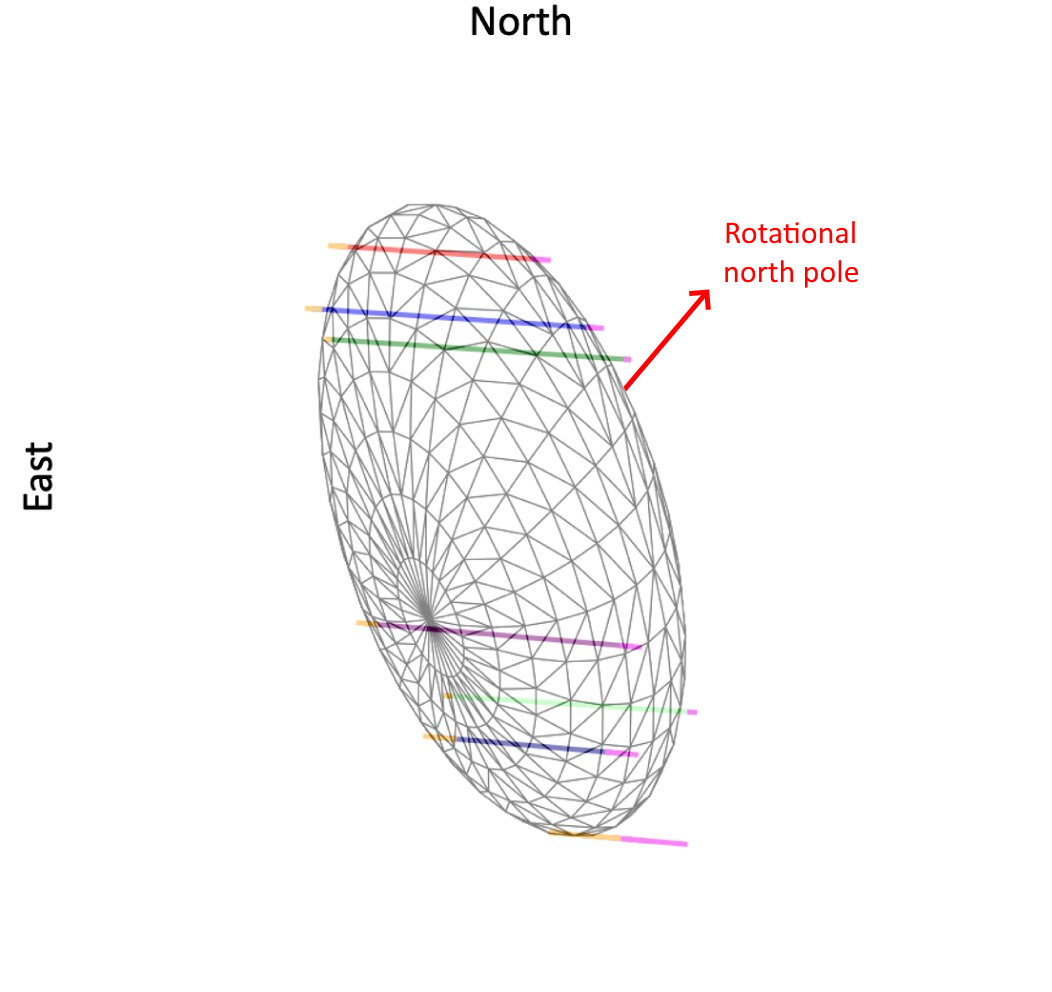
Ellipsoid shape model of Bienor fitted to occultation chords from 26 December 2022. According to this model, the rotational north pole of Bienor was pointed away from Earth.

Bienor is a highly elongated object whose shape is approximated as a triaxial ellipsoid with dimensions 254 km × 110 km × 90 km (158 mi × 68 mi × 56 mi). The shortest dimension of 90 km (56 mi) is parallel to Bienor's rotation axis, whereas the two other axes lie along Bienor's equatorial plane. Along Bienor's equator, the longest dimension of 254 km (158 mi) is more than twice as long as the shortest equatorial dimension of 110 km (68 mi). Astronomers were able to determine Bienor's shape by observing its silhouette from stellar occultations and by measuring periodic changes in its brightness over time. Observations of a stellar occultation on 6 November 2024 suggest that Bienor may be more elongated than the aforementioned ellipsoid approximation, with a maximum length of 275 km (171 mi). However, a formal analysis of the 2024 occultation has not yet been published.

The size of Bienor may be represented with an area-equivalent diameter (which is based on the amount of surface area visible from Earth), although it can vary due to rotation of its three-dimensional shape. Radiometric measurements of Bienor's thermal emission by the Herschel Space Observatory and Atacama Large Millimeter Array in 2011 and 2016 have determined an area-equivalent diameter of up to 179 to 184 km (111 to 114 mi), which would make Bienor one of the largest centaurs with measured diameters, after Chariklo, Chiron, and 2002 GZ_{32}. However, calculations of Bienor's area-equivalent diameter from occultations have consistently found smaller values between 130 and 170 km (81 and 106 mi), even when Bienor's rotation is taken into account. The discrepancy between the radiometric and occultation estimates of Bienor's area-equivalent diameter could be caused by either shape irregularities, surface albedo variation, or an unknown satellite of Bienor.

Although the mass and density of Bienor have not been measured, it could be estimated from its shape and rotation rate by assuming it is a purely self-gravitating fluid body in hydrostatic equilibrium. However, it is uncertain whether Bienor is actually in hydrostatic equilibrium. Nevertheless, estimates for Bienor's possible density range from 0.55 to 1.15 g/cm^{3}, depending on whether Bienor's brightness is affected by some external factor like surface albedo variations or an orbiting ring system. Since the densities of small Solar System bodies are expected to scale with size, Bienor's likely density is predicted to be somewhere around 0.7 g/cm^{3}—denser than a small comet nucleus, but less dense than a typical trans-Neptunian object around 500 km (310 mi) in diameter.

=== Rotation and light curve ===
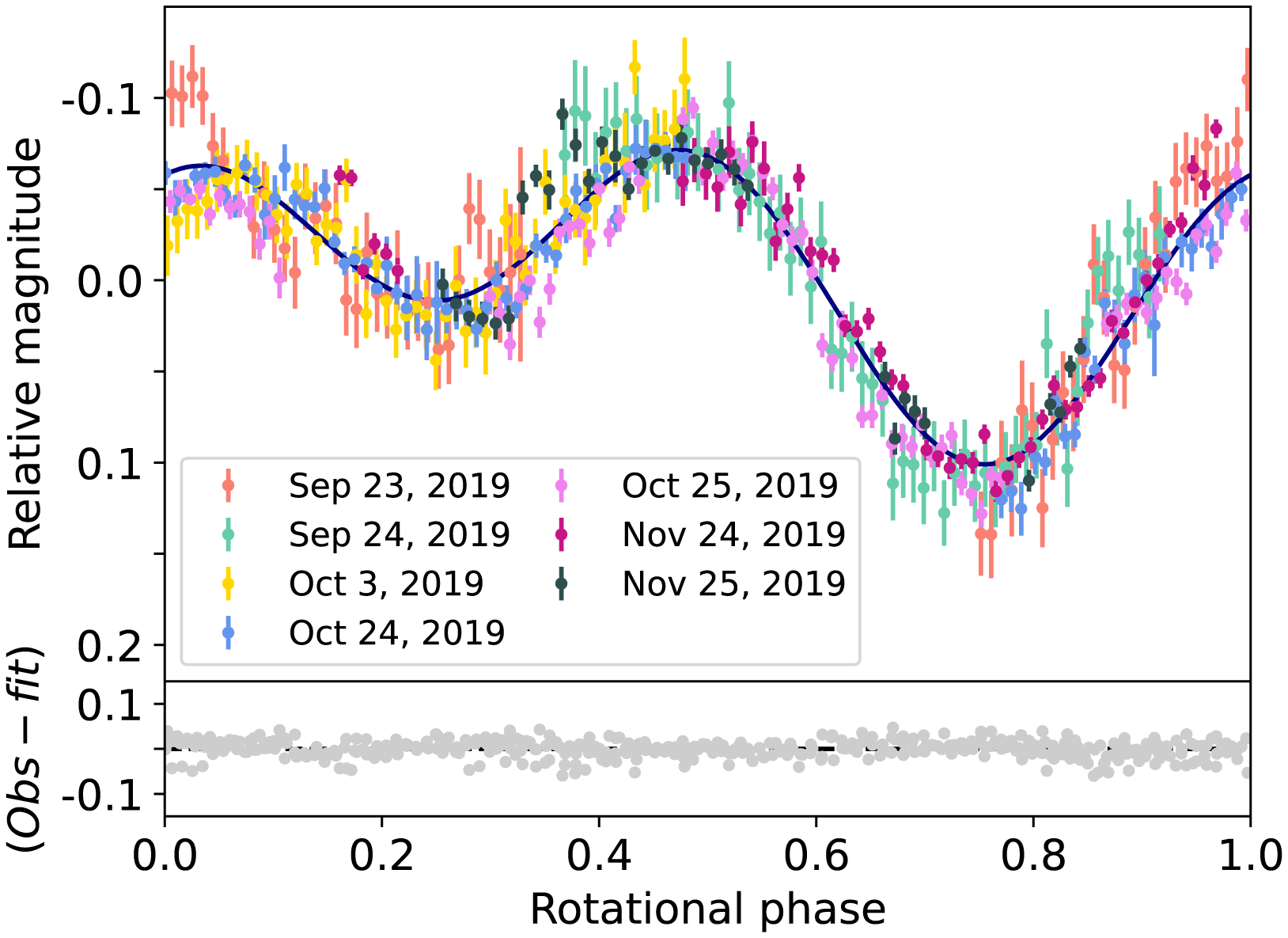
Rotational light curve of Bienor as measured in 2019, showing how its brightness varies over time. The two minima in Bienor's light curve have different depths.

Due to Bienor's elongated shape, its apparent brightness oscillates as it rotates every 9.17 hours. Bienor's rotation period was determined by measuring its brightness over time and plotting it as a light curve; this technique was first applied to Bienor in 2001, although it was not until 2003 that astronomers recognized that Bienor's correct rotation period should be around nine hours. Over the duration of Bienor's rotation, its light curve exhibits two distinct pairs of peaks and troughs whose minima differ by roughly 0.1 magnitudes; this could be caused by either an irregular shape, surface albedo variations at Bienor's poles, or an orbiting satellite or ring.

Bienor rotates in the prograde direction with respect to Earth's orbit (the ecliptic), with its rotational north pole pointing in the direction of the ecliptic coordinates (λ, β) = (35°, +50°). This translates to an axial tilt of 30° with respect to the ecliptic. The direction of Bienor's rotation pole was determined via observations of stellar occultations and long-term changes in Bienor's light curve. In particular, the amount of brightness variation or amplitude of Bienor's light curve was observed to gradually decrease between 2001 and 2016, due to the changing viewing angle of Bienor's rotation from Earth. Bienor's light curve amplitude was about 0.6 magnitudes in 2001, and reached a minimum of 0.08 magnitudes in 2015—when its pole was nearly pointed towards Earth. Bienor's light curve amplitude will maximize around 2030, when Bienor's equatorial plane aligns with Earth's line of sight—this will be an edge-on configuration.

=== Surface color and composition ===
Comparison of sizes, albedos, and colors of various large centaurs with measured diameters. Bienor is shown on the middle row, second from the left.

Bienor is a dark object with a low geometric albedo of 6.5%. It is spectrally neutral with respect to the Sun in visible light, (Note: A "spectrally neutral" object reflects similar amounts of light over a range of wavelengths (e.g. the visible spectrum).) which gives it a gray color. Based on Bienor's color in visible light, astronomers have categorized it as a member of the BR ("blue-red") group of trans-Neptunian objects and the "dark-neutral" group of centaurs. Since Bienor is believed to have transferred from the trans-Neptunian region to its current orbit a few million years ago, Bienor's surface is expected to be similar to those of trans-Neptunian objects. Near-infrared spectroscopy by telescopes on Earth have detected water ice in the surface of Bienor. Analysis of Bienor's near-infrared spectrum in 2009 suggests that 13% of its surface is composed of crystalline water ice with grains 39 μm in size, although the concentration of water ice has been observed to vary across different years, possibly due to changes in the viewing angle of Bienor from Earth. The remaining fraction of Bienor's surface composition has been tentatively suggested to be largely organic compounds. The James Webb Space Telescope has observed Bienor via mid-infrared spectroscopy in 2024, but was unable to find any recognizable spectral features that could be attributed to known compounds.

== Possible ring or satellite ==
Bienor has received scientific interest from astronomers because its large size suggests it might share certain features with Chariklo and Chiron—particularly their rings. In 2017, a team of researchers led by Estela Fernández-Valenzuela proposed that a narrow ring of icy material encircling Bienor could explain its various peculiarities, such as its overestimated area-equivalent diameter from radiometry, long-term change in absolute magnitude with viewing angle, and variation in water ice concentration. Alternatively, Bienor's peculiarities could instead be explained by the existence of a natural satellite or moon. No rings or satellites were detected in stellar occultations by Bienor in 2019–2024, although this does not rule out their possible existence around Bienor. It is possible that a ring of Bienor could have evaded detection because it was either too narrow or too transparent; observations of the 2019 occultation suggest that any possible ring around Bienor would either have to be narrower than 1.7 km (1.1 mi) in radial width at 100% opacity, or narrower than 3.4 km (2.1 mi) at 50% opacity. On the other hand, the properties of a hypothetical satellite around Bienor remain unconstrained by the available observational data on Bienor.

== Exploration concepts ==
The spacecraft exploration of Bienor was discussed in a 2008–2011 NASA case study on a hypothetical radioisotope electric propulsion (REP)-powered orbiter mission to a centaur. Bienor was initially considered a potential exploration target for this REP centaur orbiter mission, but it ended up being replaced by 32532 Thereus because Bienor was deemed incompatible with the mission's time and mass constraints. In another centaur mission concept proposed for NASA's 2023 Planetary Science Decadal Survey, dubbed the Centaur ORbiter And Lander (CORAL), Bienor was listed as a "top-interest" target alongside other centaurs like Chiron and Chariklo. However, all of these were dropped in favor of the more accessible target (433873) 2015 BQ311.

== See also ==
- List of centaurs (small Solar System bodies) § 54598
- (95626) 2002 GZ32 – one of the largest-known centaurs, with a highly elongated shape and dark surface like Bienor
