= Bianor (disambiguation) =

Bianor is a genus of spider.

Bianor (Ancient Greek: Βιάνωρ, gen.: Βιάνορος) may also refer to:

- Bianor, name of four mythical figures, see Bienor (mythology)
- Bianor (poet), a Roman-era Greek poet

== See also ==
- Papilio bianor, the common peacock butterfly
- Bienor (disambiguation)
