= (95626) 2002 GZ32 =

Elongated centaur

(95626) 2002 GZ_{32}
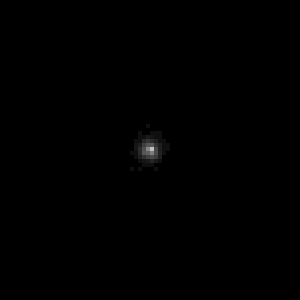
- 2002 GZ_{32} imaged by the Hubble Space Telescope on 26 February 2008

Discovery
- Discovered by: Mauna Kea Obs. (Note: The Minor Planet Center lists "Mauna Kea" as the discoverer without listing specific people.)
- Discovery site: Mauna Kea Obs.
- Discovery date: 13 April 2002

Designations
- Minor planet category: centaur · distant

Orbital characteristics
- Epoch 5 May 2025 (JD 2460800.5)
- Uncertainty parameter 0
- Observation arc: 30.33 yr
- Earliest precovery date: 29 March 1995
- Aphelion: 27.991 AU
- Perihelion: 18.003 AU
- Semi-major axis: 22.997 AU
- Eccentricity: 0.2171
- Orbital period (sidereal): 110.28 yr (40,281 days)
- Mean anomaly: 18.718°
- Mean motion: 0° 0^{m} 32.174^{s} / day
- Inclination: 15.046°
- Longitude of ascending node: 107.295°
- Time of perihelion: 10 August 2019
- Argument of perihelion: 155.376°
- Known satellites: 0
- Saturn MOID: 7.987 AU
- Uranus MOID: 1.400 AU
- Neptune MOID: 2.347 AU

Physical characteristics
- Dimensions: 366 × 306 × 120 km
- Mean diameter: 218±12 km (area equivalent)
- Sidereal rotation period: 5.80±0.03 h
- Geometric albedo: 0.043±0.007
- Spectral type: BR (TNO color class); B−V = 0.63±0.05; V−R = 0.46±0.03; V−I = 0.92±0.05
- Apparent magnitude: ~20
- Absolute magnitude (H): 7.39±0.06

(95626) 2002 GZ_{32} is a centaur orbiting the Sun between Saturn and Neptune in the outer Solar System. It is one of the largest known centaurs, having a highly elongated shape that spans 366 km (227 mi) across its longest width to 120 km (75 mi) across its shortest. The object was discovered on 13 April 2002 by astronomers at Mauna Kea Observatory in Hawaiʻi.

Due to 2002 GZ_{32}'s highly elongated shape, its apparent brightness oscillates as it rotates every 5.8 hours. 2002 GZ_{32} has a dark gray surface that potentially contains water ice. It was the third centaur whose stellar occultation has been simultaneously observed by multiple people, after 10199 Chariklo and 2060 Chiron.

== History ==
=== Discovery ===
2002 GZ_{32} imaged by the Canada–France–Hawaii Telescope on 13 April 2002

2002 GZ_{32} was discovered on 13 April 2002 by astronomers at Mauna Kea Observatory in Hawaiʻi. The observatory's 8.2-meter Subaru Telescope and University of Hawaiʻi 2.24-meter telescope were used for the discovery of 2002 GZ_{32}. Astronomers involved in the discovery included Jana Pittichová, S. Ash, Karen Meech, James Bauer, David C. Jewitt, Richard Wainscoat, Daisuke Kinoshita, Junichi Watanabe, Tetsuharu Fuse, Marc Buie, Scott Sheppard, and N. Yamamoto. The discovery of this object was announced by the Minor Planet Center (MPC) on 18 May 2002, after the object was reobserved in the same month. In 2007, astronomer Andrew Lowe reported precovery observations of 2002 GZ_{32} in Palomar Observatory's Digitized Sky Survey images from March 1995 and May 1996, which helped improve calculations of the object's orbit. These precovery observations remain as the earliest known detections of 2002 GZ_{32}.

=== Number and name ===
This object has the minor planet provisional designation 2002 GZ_{32}, which was given by the MPC in the discovery announcement. The provisional designation indicates the year and half-month of the object's discovery date. 2002 GZ_{32} received its permanent minor planet catalog number of 95626 from the MPC on 28 October 2004.

2002 GZ_{32} does not have a proper name; more than ten years has passed since the object was numbered, so the discoverers no longer have an exclusive privilege for naming this object. According to naming guidelines by the International Astronomical Union's Working Group for Small Bodies Nomenclature, 2002 GZ_{32} should be named after a mythological centaur because it orbits between Jupiter and Neptune.

== Orbit ==
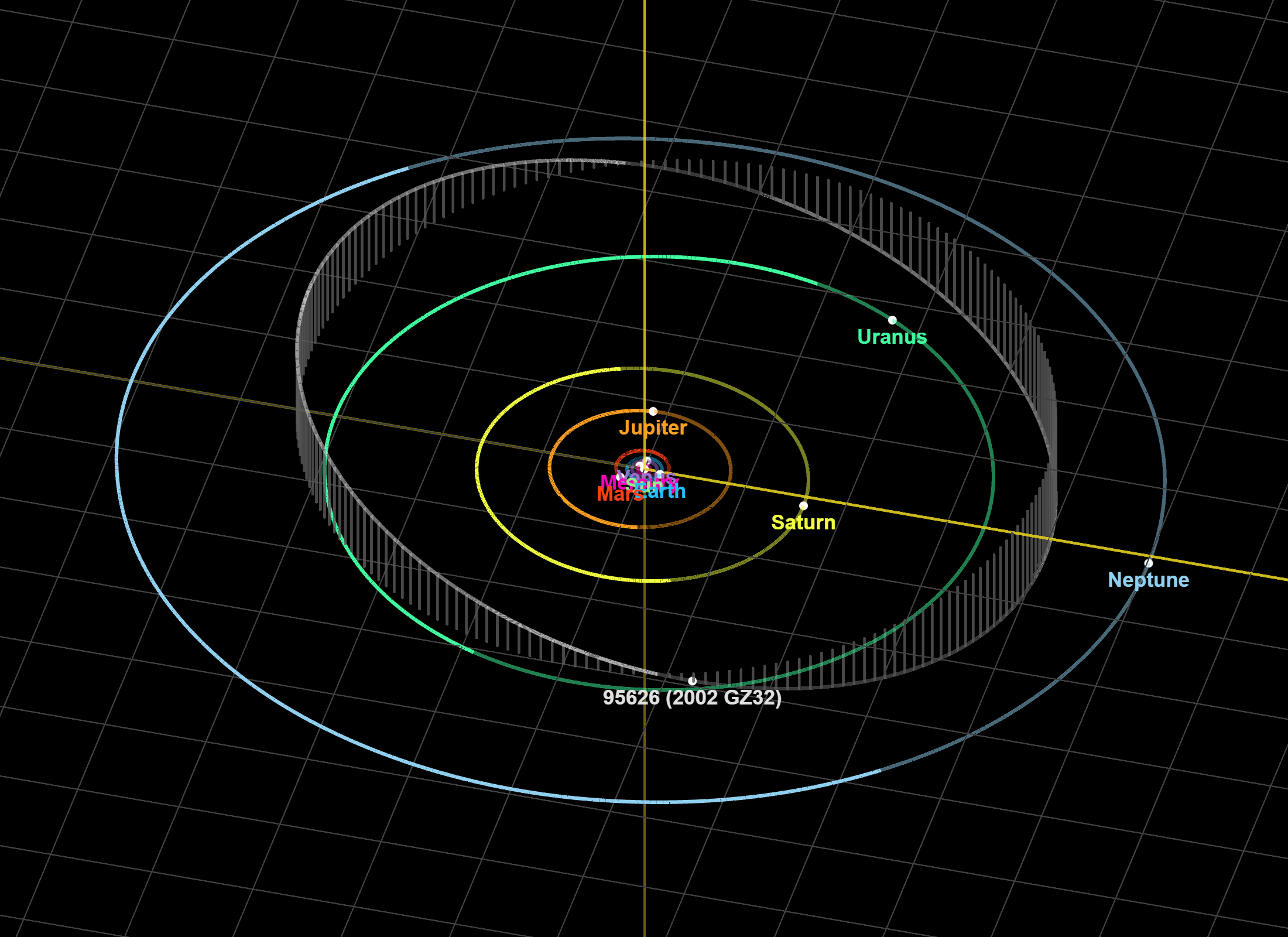
Diagram showing the orbit of 2002 GZ_{32} with the outer planets

2002 GZ_{32} orbits the Sun between Saturn and Neptune with an average orbital distance of 23 astronomical units (AU) and an orbital period of 110 years. It follows an elliptical orbit that crosses paths with Uranus, bringing the object within 18 AU from the Sun at perihelion to as far as 28 AU at aphelion. The orbit of 2002 GZ_{32} is inclined by roughly 15° with respect to the ecliptic or the orbital plane of the planets. 2002 GZ_{32} is classified as a centaur, a type of small Solar System body generally (Note: There is no universally agreed definition of a centaur, as different researchers have argued for using different criteria (see Centaur (small Solar System body)#Discrepant criteria). Regardless, centaurs are broadly cited as orbiting between Jupiter and Neptune.) defined as orbiting between Jupiter and Neptune. Centaurs are believed to be primitive progenitors of short-period comets, originating from the scattered disc beyond Neptune.

== Physical characteristics ==
=== Size, shape, and rotation ===
Comparison of sizes, albedos, and colors of various large centaurs with measured diameters. 2002 GZ_{32} is at the right in the top row.

2002 GZ_{32} is a highly elongated object with estimated ellipsoid dimensions of 366 km × 306 km × 120 km (227 mi × 190 mi × 75 mi). Its size may be represented with an area equivalent diameter of 218 km (135 mi), which would make it one of the largest known centaurs after 10199 Chariklo and 2060 Chiron. The shape of 2002 GZ_{32} was revealed to astronomers when it occulted or passed in front of a star on 20 May 2017. This occultation event was simultaneously observed by 6 out of 29 different telescopes across Europe, which allowed astronomers to map out the silhouette of 2002 GZ_{32}'s shape for the first time. 2002 GZ_{32} was the third centaur whose stellar occultation has been simultaneously observed by multiple people, after 10199 Chariklo and 2060 Chiron. (Note: Santos-Sanz et al. (2021) say that 2002 GZ_{32} was the fourth centaur with multichord occultation observations (simultaneously observed by multiple people), citing a study of Bienor's 2019 multichord occultation that was not yet published at the time. This Bienor multichord occultation study was later published by Fernández-Valenzuela et al. in 2023. For the purpose of this article, we will consider 2002 GZ_{32} as the third centaur with multichord observations, according to the time order of the observation and publication date.)

Observations from 2007 and 2017 showed that 2002 GZ_{32}'s apparent brightness oscillates sinusoidally with a double-peak period of 5.8 hours. The rotation of 2002 GZ_{32}'s elongated body causes these brightness variations, so the observed double-peak period is equal to 2002 GZ_{32}'s rotation period. The minimum degree of elongation suggested by 2002 GZ_{32}'s brightness variations (a/b = 1.13 for Δm = 0.13 magnitudes) does not match the actual shape seen in the 2017 occultation, which indicates that the object's rotation axis must be tilted with respect to Earth's line of sight. Analysis of the 2017 occultation data suggests that the aspect angle between 2002 GZ_{32}'s rotation axis and Earth's line of sight was most likely 76°.

The observed shape and rotation period of 2002 GZ_{32} do not match theoretical predictions for a purely self-gravitating body, which means that 2002 GZ_{32} is not in hydrostatic equilibrium. This is expected because 2002 GZ_{32} is likely too small to be in hydrostatic equilibrium.

=== Surface ===
2002 GZ_{32} is a dark gray object whose surface potentially contains water ice. It has a low geometric albedo of about 4%, similar to many other centaurs.

== Searches for surrounding material ==
Radio telescope observations from 2002 found no signs of carbon monoxide (CO) outgassing from 2002 GZ_{32}, which places an upper limit CO production rate of 3.8×10^{28} molecules per second. Observations of the 20 May 2017 stellar occultation by 2002 GZ_{32} showed no dense rings or debris surrounding the object, although thin rings with radial widths narrower than about a kilometer have not been ruled out.

== See also ==
- List of centaurs (small Solar System bodies) § 95626
- 54598 Bienor – a large and highly elongated centaur similar to 2002 GZ_{32}
