= Jessica Lovering =

American nuclear power researcher

Jessica Lovering is an American engineer, researcher and advocate for nuclear power. She has worked at a number of public policy organizations, researching nuclear power and promoting increased adoption of the technology as a means to mitigate climate change.

== Education ==
Lovering earned a B.A. in astrophysics from the University of California, Berkeley and M.S. degrees in environmental studies and in astrophysical and planetary sciences from the University of Colorado, Boulder. At Berkeley, she was part of the Deep Ecliptic Survey team which discovered minor planet 54598 Bienor.

In 2020 she completed a Ph.D. in engineering and public policy at Carnegie Mellon University. Her thesis, Evaluating changing paradigms across the nuclear industry, investigated the shift towards smaller, commodity, nuclear reactors from non-American exporters, and the related implications for global security.

== Public policy and advocacy ==
Lovering was hired by the Breakthrough Institute in 2012 start up their nuclear program and work on nuclear energy policy and later became the director of its energy program. Her 2016 paper, "Historical construction costs of global nuclear power reactors", argued that construction costs of nuclear power plants had escalated more moderately than previously reported, and provoked rebuttals from Jonathan Koomey and Benjamin K. Sovacool, among others. She noted the 94 nuclear reactors in the United States were based on fifty different designs while those in France and South Korea had only a few types likely leading to lower costs there.

In 2020 she co-founded the Good Energy Collective in an effort to align nuclear advocacy with progressive and environmentalist ideals. Presenting her advocacy of nuclear power as an environmental justice issue, she also engages with people about its downsides including weapons history and nuclear waste, which can impact public health. She advocated for nuclear power at a debate with Mark Jacobson at an event presented by The Steamboat Institute at Colorado Mesa University.

In 2025, she became a senior fellow at the Nuclear Innovation Alliance, an American think tank. Her written work has featured in various publications, including journals Issues in Science and Technology, Science and Public Policy, Foreign Affairs and Energy Policy.

== Selected publications ==
- Lovering, Jessica; Nordhaus, Ted; Shellenberger, Michael (September 7, 2012). "Out of the Nuclear Closet: Why it's time for environmentalists to stop worrying and love the atom". Foreign Policy.
- Lovering, Jessica R.; Yip, Arthur; Nordhaus, Ted (2016). "Historical construction costs of global nuclear power reactors". Energy Policy. 91: 371–382. doi:10.1016/j.enpol.2016.01.011.
- Lovering, Jessica; Swain, Marian; Blomqvist, Linus; Hernandez, Rebecca R. (2022). "Land-use intensity of electricity production and tomorrow's energy landscape". PLOS One. 17 (7) e0270155. doi:10.1371/journal.pone.0270155. PMC 9258890.
