= 32532 Thereus =

Centaur

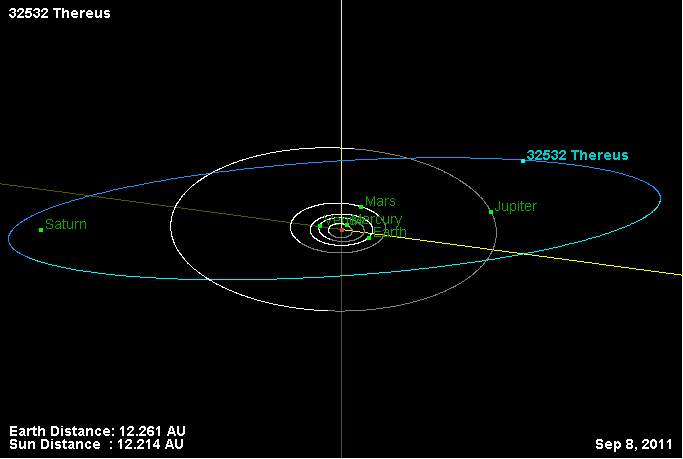

Discovery
- Discovered by: NEAT
- Discovery site: Palomar Obs.
- Discovery date: 9 August 2001

Designations
- Pronunciation: /θɪˈriːəs/
- Named after: θήρειος βία thēreios bia
- Alternative designations: 2001 PT_{13} · 1995 MM_{6} 1999 NE_{2}
- Minor planet category: centaur · distant
- Symbol: (astrological)

Orbital characteristics
- Epoch 4 September 2017 (JD 2458000.5)
- Uncertainty parameter 1
- Observation arc: 21.57 yr (7,879 days)
- Aphelion: 12.745 AU
- Perihelion: 8.5345 AU
- Semi-major axis: 10.640 AU
- Eccentricity: 0.1979
- Orbital period (sidereal): 34.70 yr (12,676 days)
- Mean anomaly: 192.91°
- Mean motion: 0° 1^{m} 42.24^{s} / day
- Inclination: 20.353°
- Longitude of ascending node: 205.33°
- Argument of perihelion: 86.322°

Physical characteristics
- Mean diameter: 62±3 km 77.19 km (derived); 80±5 km 86.500±1.900 km
- Synodic rotation period: 8.30 h 8.3091 h 8.335 h 8.338±0.002 h 8.3386±0.0006 h
- Geometric albedo: 0.057 (assumed); 0.059±0.013; 0.083±0.016; 0.0975±0.0125
- Spectral type: BR; B–V = 0.770±0.020; B–V = 0.810±0.050; B–V = 0.763±0.072; V–R = 0.490±0.010; V–R = 0.501±0.016; V–I = 0.940±0.010; V–I = 0.900±0.130; V–I = 0.917±0.035
- Absolute magnitude (H): 9.1 · 9.29 · 9.32 · 9.36 · 9.365±0.038 (R) · 9.40±0.16 · 9.42±0.01

32532 Thereus (/θɪˈriːəs/; provisional designation 2001 PT_{13}) is a centaur from the outer Solar System, approximately 80 kilometers (50 miles) in diameter. It was discovered on 9 August 2001, by astronomers of the Near-Earth Asteroid Tracking program at the Palomar Observatory in California, United States. This minor planet was named for the phrase thēreios bia 'beastly strength', used to describe centaurs in Greek mythology.

== Orbit and classification ==
Thereus orbits the Sun at a distance of 8.5–12.7 AU once every 34 years and 8 months (12,676 days). Its orbit has an eccentricity of 0.20 and an inclination of 20° with respect to the ecliptic.

The body's observation arc begins with a precovery taken by Spacewatch at Kitt Peak Observatory in June 1995, more than 6 years prior to its official discovery observation by NEAT at Palomar.

== Naming ==
This minor planet was named after Thereus, a centaur from Greek mythology. He is described as a hunter who captured bears and carried them home, alive and struggling. The official naming citation was published by the Minor Planet Center on 14 June 2003 (M.P.C. 49102).

== Physical characteristics ==
=== Rotation period ===
Since the early 2000s, several rotational lightcurves of Thereus were obtained from photometric observations with a period between 8.30 and 8.3386 hours. Analysis of the consolidated, best-rated lightcurve gave a rotation period of 8.335 hours and a brightness amplitude of 0.38 magnitude (U=3).

=== Diameter and albedo ===
Comparison of sizes, albedos, and colors of various large centaurs with measured diameters. Thereus is shown in the bottom row, second from right.

According to observations made by the NEOWISE mission of NASA's Wide-field Infrared Survey Explorer, ESA's Herschel Space Observatory with its PACS instrument, and the Spitzer Space Telescope, Thereus measures between 62 and 86.5 kilometers in diameter and its surface has an albedo between 0.059 and 0.0975.

The Collaborative Asteroid Lightcurve Link assumes a standard albedo for carbonaceous minor planets of 0.057 and derives a diameter of 77.19 kilometers based on an absolute magnitude of 9.29.

=== Surface composition ===
Observations covering different rotational phases indicate that the surface of Thereus is compositionally heterogeneous. Modeling of the reflectance variations suggests that the water-ice abundance is not uniform, but varies across the surface, with estimates ranging from ~0% up to approximately 25% in specific regions. The best-fit scattering models are consistent with intimate mixtures of water ice and refractory components, including olivine, complex organic materials (tholins), and amorphous carbon.

== See also ==
- List of centaurs (small Solar System bodies) § 32532
