= Bienor (mythology) =

In Greek mythology, the name Bienor (Ancient Greek: Βιήνωρ) or Bianor (Βιάνωρ) may refer to:

- Bienor, a Centaur at the wedding of Pirithous and Hippodamia, killed by Theseus in the ensuing battle.
- Bienor, a defender of Troy killed by Agamemnon.
- Bienor, son of Pyrnus, a soldier in the army of Cyzicus killed in the battle against the Argonauts.
- Bianor (or Ocnus), son of Manto (either the daughter of Tiresias, or of Heracles) and the river god Tuscus or Tiberis, founder of Mantua which he named after his mother.
