= (496315) 2013 GP136 =

Trans-Neptunian object

(496315) 2013 GP_{136}
Discovery
- Discovered by: OSSOS
- Discovery site: Mauna Kea Obs.
- Discovery date: 8 February 2013

Designations
- Alternative designations: o3e39
- Minor planet category: TNO · SDO

Orbital characteristics
- Epoch 4 September 2017 (JD 2458000.5)
- Uncertainty parameter 3
- Observation arc: 4.29 yr (1,566 days)
- Aphelion: 268.46 AU
- Perihelion: 41.073 AU
- Semi-major axis: 154.76 AU; 149.8 AU
- Eccentricity: 0.7346
- Orbital period (sidereal): 1925 yr (703,239 days)
- Mean anomaly: 356.44°
- Mean motion: 0° 0^{m} 1.8^{s} / day
- Inclination: 33.467°
- Longitude of ascending node: 210.71°
- Argument of perihelion: 42.316°

Physical characteristics
- Dimensions: 212 km
- Absolute magnitude (H): 6.6

(496315) 2013 GP_{136} is a trans-Neptunian object from the scattered disc in the outermost reaches of the Solar System. It is approximately 212 kilometers in diameter. It was discovered on 8 February 2013, by the Outer Solar System Origins Survey at the Mauna Kea Observatories on the island of Hawaii, United States.

== Orbit and classification ==
2013 GP_{136} orbits the Sun at a distance of 41.1–268.5 AU once every 1925 years and 4 months (703,239 days). Its orbit has an eccentricity of 0.73 and an inclination of 33° with respect to the ecliptic.

It was mentioned in a 2016 paper by Malhotra of the Lunar and Planetary Laboratory, at the University of Arizona, as a detached object with a perihelion greater than 40 AUs, a 6:1 orbital period ratio with 90377 Sedna, and in a possible 9:1 mean-motion resonance with a hypothetical large Planet Nine.
