= List of minor planets: 500001–501000 =

The following is a partial list of minor planets, running from minor-planet number 500001 through 501000, inclusive. The primary data for this and other partial lists is based on JPL's "Small-Body Orbital Elements" and data available from the Minor Planet Center. Critical list information is also provided by the MPC, unless otherwise specified from Lowell Observatory. A detailed description of the table's columns and additional sources are given on the main page including a complete list of every page in this series, and a statistical break-up on the dynamical classification of minor planets.

Also see the summary list of all named bodies in numerical and alphabetical order, and the corresponding naming citations for the number range of this particular list. New namings may only be added to this list after official publication, as the preannouncement of names is condemned by the Working Group for Small Bodies Nomenclature of the International Astronomical Union.

Near-Earth obj.	MBA (inner)	MBA (outer)	Centaur
Mars-crosser	MBA (middle)	Jupiter trojan	Trans-Neptunian obj.
Unclassified

== 500001–500100 ==
Designation			Discovery			Properties		Ref
Permanent	Provisional	Named after	Date	Site	Discoverer(s)	Category	Diam.	Ref
500001	2011 PX_{10}	—	August 1, 2011	Haleakala	Pan-STARRS 1	EOS	2.0 km	MPC · JPL
500002	2011 PQ_{14}	—	August 6, 2011	Haleakala	Pan-STARRS 1	·	2.4 km	MPC · JPL
500003	2011 QW_{2}	—	November 15, 2006	Mount Lemmon	Mount Lemmon Survey	·	2.3 km	MPC · JPL
500004	2011 QE_{4}	—	August 2, 2011	Haleakala	Pan-STARRS 1	·	3.3 km	MPC · JPL
500005	2011 QC_{5}	—	December 5, 2007	Mount Lemmon	Mount Lemmon Survey	LUT	4.2 km	MPC · JPL
500006	2011 QR_{8}	—	September 17, 2006	Kitt Peak	Spacewatch	·	2.3 km	MPC · JPL
500007	2011 QT_{8}	—	August 20, 2011	Haleakala	Pan-STARRS 1	·	2.2 km	MPC · JPL
500008	2011 QB_{13}	—	June 12, 2011	Mount Lemmon	Mount Lemmon Survey	·	3.1 km	MPC · JPL
500009	2011 QQ_{17}	—	July 6, 2005	Siding Spring	SSS	·	3.0 km	MPC · JPL
500010	2011 QY_{19}	—	October 19, 2006	Mount Lemmon	Mount Lemmon Survey	·	2.5 km	MPC · JPL
500011	2011 QB_{20}	—	August 20, 2011	Haleakala	Pan-STARRS 1	EUP	3.2 km	MPC · JPL
500012	2011 QD_{34}	—	August 24, 2011	Haleakala	Pan-STARRS 1	·	2.9 km	MPC · JPL
500013	2011 QN_{35}	—	March 25, 2003	Kitt Peak	Spacewatch	T_{j} (2.99) · EUP	3.6 km	MPC · JPL
500014	2011 QL_{47}	—	May 31, 2010	WISE	WISE	T_{j} (2.97)	3.2 km	MPC · JPL
500015	2011 QZ_{48}	—	October 1, 2000	Socorro	LINEAR	·	3.4 km	MPC · JPL
500016	2011 QH_{58}	—	August 30, 2011	Haleakala	Pan-STARRS 1	EOS	2.1 km	MPC · JPL
500017	2011 QL_{60}	—	October 1, 2000	Socorro	LINEAR	·	3.1 km	MPC · JPL
500018	2011 QW_{63}	—	August 24, 2011	Haleakala	Pan-STARRS 1	·	2.0 km	MPC · JPL
500019	2011 QW_{78}	—	August 23, 2011	Haleakala	Pan-STARRS 1	·	3.3 km	MPC · JPL
500020	2011 QY_{84}	—	February 2, 2008	Mount Lemmon	Mount Lemmon Survey	VER	2.2 km	MPC · JPL
500021	2011 QZ_{86}	—	June 10, 2011	Mount Lemmon	Mount Lemmon Survey	VER	3.0 km	MPC · JPL
500022	2011 QU_{94}	—	August 31, 2011	Haleakala	Pan-STARRS 1	·	3.7 km	MPC · JPL
500023	2011 RA_{3}	—	September 4, 2011	Haleakala	Pan-STARRS 1	EOS	1.9 km	MPC · JPL
500024	2011 SW	—	May 13, 2010	Kitt Peak	Spacewatch	·	2.5 km	MPC · JPL
500025	2011 SS_{6}	—	September 2, 2011	Haleakala	Pan-STARRS 1	EOS	1.9 km	MPC · JPL
500026	2011 SS_{21}	—	September 18, 2011	Mount Lemmon	Mount Lemmon Survey	·	850 m	MPC · JPL
500027	2011 SD_{29}	—	October 29, 2005	Kitt Peak	Spacewatch	CYB	3.1 km	MPC · JPL
500028	2011 SC_{34}	—	September 20, 2011	Kitt Peak	Spacewatch	T_{j} (2.98)	3.1 km	MPC · JPL
500029	2011 SW_{39}	—	February 12, 2008	Mount Lemmon	Mount Lemmon Survey	·	3.3 km	MPC · JPL
500030	2011 SY_{42}	—	September 2, 2011	Haleakala	Pan-STARRS 1	·	710 m	MPC · JPL
500031	2011 SS_{47}	—	March 3, 2009	Kitt Peak	Spacewatch	VER	2.3 km	MPC · JPL
500032	2011 SF_{63}	—	August 30, 2011	La Sagra	OAM	·	3.1 km	MPC · JPL
500033	2011 SS_{75}	—	September 4, 2011	Kitt Peak	Spacewatch	·	3.0 km	MPC · JPL
500034	2011 SS_{82}	—	September 20, 2011	Mount Lemmon	Mount Lemmon Survey	·	650 m	MPC · JPL
500035	2011 SM_{108}	—	August 4, 2011	La Sagra	OAM	·	3.1 km	MPC · JPL
500036	2011 SZ_{110}	—	June 9, 2011	Haleakala	Pan-STARRS 1	·	3.2 km	MPC · JPL
500037	2011 SG_{114}	—	March 19, 2010	Mount Lemmon	Mount Lemmon Survey	T_{j} (2.98)	3.3 km	MPC · JPL
500038	2011 SG_{136}	—	March 11, 2008	Mount Lemmon	Mount Lemmon Survey	·	2.7 km	MPC · JPL
500039	2011 SM_{156}	—	September 26, 2011	Haleakala	Pan-STARRS 1	·	3.3 km	MPC · JPL
500040	2011 SJ_{177}	—	September 26, 2011	Haleakala	Pan-STARRS 1	·	3.0 km	MPC · JPL
500041	2011 SV_{191}	—	October 4, 1994	Kitt Peak	Spacewatch	·	2.5 km	MPC · JPL
500042	2011 SK_{192}	—	September 4, 2011	Haleakala	Pan-STARRS 1	VER	2.7 km	MPC · JPL
500043	2011 SJ_{201}	—	July 14, 2010	WISE	WISE	T_{j} (2.99)	2.8 km	MPC · JPL
500044	2011 SB_{216}	—	August 23, 2011	Haleakala	Pan-STARRS 1	·	2.8 km	MPC · JPL
500045	2011 SQ_{248}	—	October 25, 2005	Kitt Peak	Spacewatch	CYB	3.8 km	MPC · JPL
500046	2011 SN_{260}	—	September 30, 2011	Kitt Peak	Spacewatch	·	700 m	MPC · JPL
500047	2011 SQ_{262}	—	February 26, 2009	Mount Lemmon	Mount Lemmon Survey	·	2.8 km	MPC · JPL
500048	2011 TC_{6}	—	September 23, 2011	Catalina	CSS	EUP	3.8 km	MPC · JPL
500049	2011 UY_{5}	—	September 23, 2011	Mount Lemmon	Mount Lemmon Survey	·	630 m	MPC · JPL
500050	2011 US_{40}	—	October 27, 2008	Kitt Peak	Spacewatch	·	440 m	MPC · JPL
500051	2011 UB_{74}	—	October 18, 2011	Mount Lemmon	Mount Lemmon Survey	·	550 m	MPC · JPL
500052	2011 UK_{103}	—	November 14, 2007	Kitt Peak	Spacewatch	·	960 m	MPC · JPL
500053	2011 UU_{123}	—	September 29, 2005	Mount Lemmon	Mount Lemmon Survey	CYB	2.7 km	MPC · JPL
500054	2011 UE_{135}	—	December 10, 2005	Kitt Peak	Spacewatch	·	1.0 km	MPC · JPL
500055	2011 UG_{147}	—	October 25, 2011	Kitt Peak	Spacewatch	CYB	3.9 km	MPC · JPL
500056	2011 UZ_{154}	—	September 26, 2011	Haleakala	Pan-STARRS 1	EOS	2.1 km	MPC · JPL
500057	2011 UB_{163}	—	December 2, 2005	Mount Lemmon	Mount Lemmon Survey	·	760 m	MPC · JPL
500058	2011 UA_{167}	—	February 13, 2008	Kitt Peak	Spacewatch	·	3.3 km	MPC · JPL
500059	2011 UQ_{185}	—	October 25, 2011	Haleakala	Pan-STARRS 1	·	4.2 km	MPC · JPL
500060	2011 UQ_{246}	—	October 26, 2011	Haleakala	Pan-STARRS 1	·	650 m	MPC · JPL
500061	2011 UV_{257}	—	October 24, 2011	Haleakala	Pan-STARRS 1	·	560 m	MPC · JPL
500062	2011 UF_{271}	—	October 3, 2005	Catalina	CSS	CYB	4.1 km	MPC · JPL
500063	2011 UA_{286}	—	January 20, 2008	Kitt Peak	Spacewatch	·	3.7 km	MPC · JPL
500064	2011 UY_{291}	—	October 23, 2011	Mount Lemmon	Mount Lemmon Survey	·	530 m	MPC · JPL
500065	2011 UO_{303}	—	October 18, 2011	Kitt Peak	Spacewatch	·	570 m	MPC · JPL
500066	2011 UO_{314}	—	January 6, 2006	Mount Lemmon	Mount Lemmon Survey	·	530 m	MPC · JPL
500067	2011 UK_{316}	—	October 25, 2011	Haleakala	Pan-STARRS 1	·	580 m	MPC · JPL
500068	2011 UY_{381}	—	September 25, 2011	Haleakala	Pan-STARRS 1	·	3.5 km	MPC · JPL
500069	2011 UC_{406}	—	September 25, 2011	Haleakala	Pan-STARRS 1	·	2.4 km	MPC · JPL
500070	2011 VW_{15}	—	December 25, 2005	Kitt Peak	Spacewatch	·	560 m	MPC · JPL
500071	2011 VE_{19}	—	October 18, 2011	Mount Lemmon	Mount Lemmon Survey	EOS	2.1 km	MPC · JPL
500072	2011 WN_{25}	—	November 18, 2011	Mount Lemmon	Mount Lemmon Survey	·	670 m	MPC · JPL
500073	2011 WD_{27}	—	October 26, 2011	Haleakala	Pan-STARRS 1	·	3.7 km	MPC · JPL
500074	2011 WB_{35}	—	October 26, 2011	Haleakala	Pan-STARRS 1	·	850 m	MPC · JPL
500075	2011 WU_{67}	—	November 17, 2011	Kitt Peak	Spacewatch	·	490 m	MPC · JPL
500076	2011 WO_{70}	—	October 26, 2011	Haleakala	Pan-STARRS 1	·	840 m	MPC · JPL
500077	2011 WJ_{76}	—	October 1, 2011	Mount Lemmon	Mount Lemmon Survey	·	600 m	MPC · JPL
500078	2011 WZ_{88}	—	November 25, 2011	Haleakala	Pan-STARRS 1	·	620 m	MPC · JPL
500079	2011 WY_{92}	—	December 22, 2008	Kitt Peak	Spacewatch	·	700 m	MPC · JPL
500080	2011 WV_{134}	—	November 30, 2011	Catalina	CSS	T_{j} (2.94) · APO +1km · PHA	1.3 km	MPC · JPL
500081	2011 WJ_{148}	—	November 24, 2011	Kitt Peak	Spacewatch	·	590 m	MPC · JPL
500082	2011 YF_{1}	—	November 17, 2011	Mount Lemmon	Mount Lemmon Survey	·	1.3 km	MPC · JPL
500083	2011 YO_{11}	—	November 27, 2011	Mount Lemmon	Mount Lemmon Survey	·	830 m	MPC · JPL
500084	2011 YF_{26}	—	December 25, 2011	Kitt Peak	Spacewatch	·	470 m	MPC · JPL
500085	2011 YK_{37}	—	December 26, 2011	Kitt Peak	Spacewatch	·	550 m	MPC · JPL
500086	2011 YO_{43}	—	December 27, 2011	Kitt Peak	Spacewatch	·	790 m	MPC · JPL
500087	2011 YL_{57}	—	December 29, 2011	Kitt Peak	Spacewatch	·	850 m	MPC · JPL
500088	2011 YK_{65}	—	December 31, 2011	Kitt Peak	Spacewatch	V	590 m	MPC · JPL
500089	2011 YE_{73}	—	December 30, 2011	Kitt Peak	Spacewatch	·	770 m	MPC · JPL
500090	2011 YQ_{74}	—	December 30, 2005	Mount Lemmon	Mount Lemmon Survey	TIR	4.4 km	MPC · JPL
500091	2012 AD_{15}	—	December 16, 2004	Catalina	CSS	PHO	1.1 km	MPC · JPL
500092	2012 BA_{10}	—	February 10, 2008	Catalina	CSS	BAR	1.1 km	MPC · JPL
500093	2012 BB_{17}	—	January 11, 2008	Kitt Peak	Spacewatch	·	960 m	MPC · JPL
500094	2012 BC_{20}	—	January 21, 2012	Catalina	CSS	APO	650 m	MPC · JPL
500095	2012 BT_{20}	—	November 28, 2011	Mount Lemmon	Mount Lemmon Survey	·	750 m	MPC · JPL
500096	2012 BY_{20}	—	January 21, 2012	Haleakala	Pan-STARRS 1	·	930 m	MPC · JPL
500097	2012 BX_{21}	—	January 2, 2012	Mount Lemmon	Mount Lemmon Survey	·	640 m	MPC · JPL
500098	2012 BY_{28}	—	January 1, 2012	Mount Lemmon	Mount Lemmon Survey	·	730 m	MPC · JPL
500099	2012 BK_{38}	—	September 13, 2007	Kitt Peak	Spacewatch	·	630 m	MPC · JPL
500100	2012 BP_{51}	—	September 2, 2010	Mount Lemmon	Mount Lemmon Survey	·	750 m	MPC · JPL

== 500101–500200 ==
back to top

Designation			Discovery			Properties		Ref
Permanent	Provisional	Named after	Date	Site	Discoverer(s)	Category	Diam.	Ref
500101	2012 BZ_{59}	—	January 25, 2012	Haleakala	Pan-STARRS 1	V	550 m	MPC · JPL
500102	2012 BX_{70}	—	January 21, 2012	Kitt Peak	Spacewatch	MAS	580 m	MPC · JPL
500103	2012 BA_{73}	—	January 21, 2012	Haleakala	Pan-STARRS 1	PHO	1.1 km	MPC · JPL
500104	2012 BW_{82}	—	May 10, 2005	Kitt Peak	Spacewatch	·	1.1 km	MPC · JPL
500105	2012 BQ_{84}	—	January 27, 2012	Mount Lemmon	Mount Lemmon Survey	·	680 m	MPC · JPL
500106	2012 BH_{85}	—	January 27, 2012	Mount Lemmon	Mount Lemmon Survey	·	1.1 km	MPC · JPL
500107	2012 BA_{91}	—	April 21, 2009	Kitt Peak	Spacewatch	V	640 m	MPC · JPL
500108	2012 BQ_{91}	—	January 26, 2012	Mount Lemmon	Mount Lemmon Survey	·	800 m	MPC · JPL
500109	2012 BS_{94}	—	January 27, 2012	Mount Lemmon	Mount Lemmon Survey	·	820 m	MPC · JPL
500110	2012 BJ_{100}	—	January 19, 2012	Kitt Peak	Spacewatch	·	590 m	MPC · JPL
500111	2012 BV_{100}	—	September 13, 2007	Mount Lemmon	Mount Lemmon Survey	·	550 m	MPC · JPL
500112	2012 BL_{105}	—	January 27, 2012	Kitt Peak	Spacewatch	·	1.3 km	MPC · JPL
500113	2012 BA_{111}	—	January 27, 2012	Kitt Peak	Spacewatch	·	820 m	MPC · JPL
500114	2012 BW_{114}	—	January 27, 2012	Mount Lemmon	Mount Lemmon Survey	·	900 m	MPC · JPL
500115	2012 BE_{118}	—	April 10, 2005	Mount Lemmon	Mount Lemmon Survey	MAS	600 m	MPC · JPL
500116	2012 BO_{118}	—	January 20, 2012	Kitt Peak	Spacewatch	MAS	510 m	MPC · JPL
500117	2012 BO_{125}	—	January 21, 2012	Kitt Peak	Spacewatch	V	500 m	MPC · JPL
500118	2012 BM_{137}	—	January 19, 2012	Kitt Peak	Spacewatch	·	530 m	MPC · JPL
500119	2012 BV_{137}	—	November 17, 2004	Campo Imperatore	CINEOS	·	480 m	MPC · JPL
500120	2012 BP_{148}	—	January 29, 2012	Kitt Peak	Spacewatch	V	510 m	MPC · JPL
500121	2012 BW_{149}	—	January 19, 2012	Haleakala	Pan-STARRS 1	·	640 m	MPC · JPL
500122	2012 CX_{6}	—	September 13, 2007	Mount Lemmon	Mount Lemmon Survey	·	510 m	MPC · JPL
500123	2012 CK_{11}	—	January 19, 2012	Kitt Peak	Spacewatch	·	860 m	MPC · JPL
500124	2012 CW_{12}	—	January 18, 2008	Kitt Peak	Spacewatch	V	780 m	MPC · JPL
500125	2012 CB_{14}	—	February 9, 2005	Mount Lemmon	Mount Lemmon Survey	·	570 m	MPC · JPL
500126	2012 CB_{16}	—	February 3, 2012	Haleakala	Pan-STARRS 1	NYS	1.1 km	MPC · JPL
500127	2012 CP_{19}	—	January 16, 2005	Kitt Peak	Spacewatch	·	610 m	MPC · JPL
500128	2012 CD_{25}	—	February 13, 2012	Haleakala	Pan-STARRS 1	·	800 m	MPC · JPL
500129	2012 CV_{27}	—	January 18, 2012	Kitt Peak	Spacewatch	·	680 m	MPC · JPL
500130	2012 CW_{27}	—	January 18, 2012	Kitt Peak	Spacewatch	·	730 m	MPC · JPL
500131	2012 CW_{32}	—	April 26, 2008	Mount Lemmon	Mount Lemmon Survey	·	1.4 km	MPC · JPL
500132	2012 CT_{33}	—	November 9, 2007	Mount Lemmon	Mount Lemmon Survey	·	700 m	MPC · JPL
500133	2012 CC_{35}	—	September 12, 2007	Mount Lemmon	Mount Lemmon Survey	·	600 m	MPC · JPL
500134	2012 CX_{36}	—	September 12, 2007	Kitt Peak	Spacewatch	·	550 m	MPC · JPL
500135	2012 CT_{42}	—	February 4, 2012	Haleakala	Pan-STARRS 1	·	870 m	MPC · JPL
500136	2012 CO_{46}	—	February 15, 2012	Haleakala	Pan-STARRS 1	AMO	100 m	MPC · JPL
500137	2012 CD_{52}	—	January 19, 2012	Haleakala	Pan-STARRS 1	·	970 m	MPC · JPL
500138	2012 CC_{55}	—	February 19, 2012	Catalina	CSS	H	750 m	MPC · JPL
500139	2012 DY_{4}	—	March 4, 2005	Mount Lemmon	Mount Lemmon Survey	·	760 m	MPC · JPL
500140	2012 DG_{8}	—	June 4, 1999	Catalina	CSS	·	1.4 km	MPC · JPL
500141	2012 DP_{12}	—	June 2, 2008	Mount Lemmon	Mount Lemmon Survey	·	1.4 km	MPC · JPL
500142	2012 DO_{15}	—	April 10, 2003	Kitt Peak	Spacewatch	·	1.9 km	MPC · JPL
500143	2012 DT_{16}	—	February 28, 2008	Mount Lemmon	Mount Lemmon Survey	·	2.0 km	MPC · JPL
500144	2012 DW_{16}	—	February 16, 2012	Haleakala	Pan-STARRS 1	V	510 m	MPC · JPL
500145	2012 DC_{30}	—	February 24, 2012	Haleakala	Pan-STARRS 1	·	1.5 km	MPC · JPL
500146	2012 DH_{32}	—	February 13, 2012	Kitt Peak	Spacewatch	·	910 m	MPC · JPL
500147	2012 DU_{34}	—	February 24, 2012	Kitt Peak	Spacewatch	·	1.3 km	MPC · JPL
500148	2012 DS_{45}	—	January 13, 2008	Kitt Peak	Spacewatch	NYS	920 m	MPC · JPL
500149	2012 DH_{49}	—	March 10, 2005	Kitt Peak	Spacewatch	·	820 m	MPC · JPL
500150	2012 DA_{55}	—	December 30, 2011	Kitt Peak	Spacewatch	·	1.2 km	MPC · JPL
500151	2012 DA_{64}	—	January 26, 2012	Mount Lemmon	Mount Lemmon Survey	PHO	920 m	MPC · JPL
500152	2012 DR_{66}	—	February 16, 2012	Haleakala	Pan-STARRS 1	·	2.1 km	MPC · JPL
500153	2012 DW_{66}	—	March 10, 2008	Kitt Peak	Spacewatch	·	1.0 km	MPC · JPL
500154	2012 DE_{80}	—	February 26, 2012	Haleakala	Pan-STARRS 1	MAS	660 m	MPC · JPL
500155	2012 DF_{81}	—	February 26, 2012	Haleakala	Pan-STARRS 1	·	1.0 km	MPC · JPL
500156	2012 DG_{89}	—	December 6, 2011	Haleakala	Pan-STARRS 1	·	1.5 km	MPC · JPL
500157	2012 EU	—	March 1, 2012	Mount Lemmon	Mount Lemmon Survey	·	950 m	MPC · JPL
500158	2012 ED_{5}	—	January 18, 2012	Mount Lemmon	Mount Lemmon Survey	·	1.3 km	MPC · JPL
500159	2012 EY_{13}	—	October 14, 2007	Mount Lemmon	Mount Lemmon Survey	·	600 m	MPC · JPL
500160	2012 EQ_{16}	—	January 20, 2008	Mount Lemmon	Mount Lemmon Survey	·	1.2 km	MPC · JPL
500161	2012 EW_{16}	—	November 27, 2006	Mount Lemmon	Mount Lemmon Survey	·	2.0 km	MPC · JPL
500162	2012 EH_{17}	—	October 12, 2010	Mount Lemmon	Mount Lemmon Survey	·	1.4 km	MPC · JPL
500163	2012 FS	—	November 18, 2007	Mount Lemmon	Mount Lemmon Survey	·	630 m	MPC · JPL
500164	2012 FH_{6}	—	September 4, 2010	La Sagra	OAM	·	810 m	MPC · JPL
500165	2012 FO_{12}	—	December 6, 2011	Haleakala	Pan-STARRS 1	·	1.2 km	MPC · JPL
500166	2012 FS_{12}	—	March 16, 2012	Kitt Peak	Spacewatch	NYS	940 m	MPC · JPL
500167	2012 FP_{19}	—	February 8, 2008	Mount Lemmon	Mount Lemmon Survey	MAS	640 m	MPC · JPL
500168	2012 FY_{19}	—	February 22, 2012	Kitt Peak	Spacewatch	·	740 m	MPC · JPL
500169	2012 FC_{21}	—	August 27, 2006	Kitt Peak	Spacewatch	·	1.2 km	MPC · JPL
500170 Lusitano	2012 FF_{25}	Lusitano	February 26, 2012	Haleakala	Pan-STARRS 1	·	1.2 km	MPC · JPL
500171	2012 FW_{25}	—	February 27, 2012	Haleakala	Pan-STARRS 1	·	990 m	MPC · JPL
500172	2012 FP_{34}	—	April 11, 2005	Mount Lemmon	Mount Lemmon Survey	·	1.1 km	MPC · JPL
500173	2012 FX_{40}	—	February 2, 2008	Mount Lemmon	Mount Lemmon Survey	MAS	600 m	MPC · JPL
500174	2012 FH_{42}	—	December 31, 2007	Kitt Peak	Spacewatch	MAS	570 m	MPC · JPL
500175	2012 FM_{44}	—	September 12, 2009	Kitt Peak	Spacewatch	·	1.4 km	MPC · JPL
500176	2012 FN_{45}	—	May 10, 2005	Mount Lemmon	Mount Lemmon Survey	MAS	580 m	MPC · JPL
500177	2012 FW_{45}	—	February 28, 2012	Haleakala	Pan-STARRS 1	NYS	1.0 km	MPC · JPL
500178	2012 FN_{46}	—	February 21, 2012	Kitt Peak	Spacewatch	·	1.3 km	MPC · JPL
500179	2012 FL_{47}	—	February 26, 2012	Kitt Peak	Spacewatch	·	930 m	MPC · JPL
500180	2012 FC_{49}	—	February 22, 2012	Kitt Peak	Spacewatch	·	1.0 km	MPC · JPL
500181	2012 FG_{50}	—	February 28, 2012	Haleakala	Pan-STARRS 1	(5)	1.2 km	MPC · JPL
500182	2012 FK_{51}	—	March 15, 2012	Mount Lemmon	Mount Lemmon Survey	·	1.0 km	MPC · JPL
500183	2012 FH_{53}	—	February 27, 2012	Haleakala	Pan-STARRS 1	·	1.1 km	MPC · JPL
500184	2012 FM_{59}	—	September 11, 2010	Kitt Peak	Spacewatch	·	1.1 km	MPC · JPL
500185	2012 FU_{75}	—	February 27, 2012	Kitt Peak	Spacewatch	·	1.0 km	MPC · JPL
500186	2012 GH_{3}	—	January 13, 2008	Kitt Peak	Spacewatch	·	810 m	MPC · JPL
500187	2012 GV_{8}	—	March 15, 2012	Kitt Peak	Spacewatch	·	1.1 km	MPC · JPL
500188	2012 GZ_{16}	—	April 15, 2012	Haleakala	Pan-STARRS 1	·	1.8 km	MPC · JPL
500189	2012 GB_{19}	—	January 11, 2008	Kitt Peak	Spacewatch	MAS	590 m	MPC · JPL
500190	2012 GZ_{20}	—	February 28, 2012	Haleakala	Pan-STARRS 1	MAS	630 m	MPC · JPL
500191	2012 GC_{22}	—	February 24, 2012	Mount Lemmon	Mount Lemmon Survey	·	1.5 km	MPC · JPL
500192	2012 GO_{22}	—	April 15, 2012	Haleakala	Pan-STARRS 1	·	1.8 km	MPC · JPL
500193	2012 GP_{34}	—	February 29, 2012	Mount Lemmon	Mount Lemmon Survey	·	1.0 km	MPC · JPL
500194	2012 GS_{35}	—	March 24, 2012	Kitt Peak	Spacewatch	·	1.0 km	MPC · JPL
500195	2012 GJ_{36}	—	October 22, 2009	Mount Lemmon	Mount Lemmon Survey	·	1.7 km	MPC · JPL
500196	2012 HG_{1}	—	January 27, 2011	Mount Lemmon	Mount Lemmon Survey	·	1.5 km	MPC · JPL
500197	2012 HB_{3}	—	April 16, 2012	Kitt Peak	Spacewatch	EUN	1.2 km	MPC · JPL
500198	2012 HV_{4}	—	July 2, 2008	Kitt Peak	Spacewatch	·	1.5 km	MPC · JPL
500199	2012 HQ_{6}	—	January 6, 2012	Haleakala	Pan-STARRS 1	·	1.2 km	MPC · JPL
500200	2012 HQ_{8}	—	April 15, 2012	Haleakala	Pan-STARRS 1	EUN	1.1 km	MPC · JPL

== 500201–500300 ==
back to top

Designation			Discovery			Properties		Ref
Permanent	Provisional	Named after	Date	Site	Discoverer(s)	Category	Diam.	Ref
500201	2012 HO_{9}	—	April 15, 2012	Haleakala	Pan-STARRS 1	·	1.5 km	MPC · JPL
500202	2012 HX_{12}	—	May 14, 2008	Mount Lemmon	Mount Lemmon Survey	·	850 m	MPC · JPL
500203	2012 HO_{17}	—	May 29, 2008	Mount Lemmon	Mount Lemmon Survey	·	1.5 km	MPC · JPL
500204	2012 HQ_{19}	—	March 12, 2007	Kitt Peak	Spacewatch	·	1.6 km	MPC · JPL
500205	2012 HZ_{26}	—	February 25, 2012	Mount Lemmon	Mount Lemmon Survey	·	1.6 km	MPC · JPL
500206	2012 HF_{27}	—	April 15, 2012	Haleakala	Pan-STARRS 1	·	1.3 km	MPC · JPL
500207	2012 HQ_{27}	—	March 29, 2012	Mount Lemmon	Mount Lemmon Survey	·	930 m	MPC · JPL
500208	2012 HB_{28}	—	April 24, 2012	Kitt Peak	Spacewatch	KON	1.9 km	MPC · JPL
500209	2012 HK_{28}	—	December 15, 2007	Mount Lemmon	Mount Lemmon Survey	·	890 m	MPC · JPL
500210	2012 HN_{30}	—	March 23, 2012	Mount Lemmon	Mount Lemmon Survey	EUN	1.4 km	MPC · JPL
500211	2012 HM_{32}	—	April 28, 2004	Kitt Peak	Spacewatch	·	1.0 km	MPC · JPL
500212	2012 HD_{34}	—	March 27, 2012	Kitt Peak	Spacewatch	·	1.2 km	MPC · JPL
500213	2012 HL_{36}	—	January 27, 2007	Kitt Peak	Spacewatch	·	1.5 km	MPC · JPL
500214	2012 HC_{42}	—	December 31, 2007	Kitt Peak	Spacewatch	NYS	950 m	MPC · JPL
500215	2012 HV_{43}	—	March 27, 2012	Kitt Peak	Spacewatch	·	1.1 km	MPC · JPL
500216	2012 HP_{47}	—	March 31, 2008	Mount Lemmon	Mount Lemmon Survey	·	1.7 km	MPC · JPL
500217	2012 HB_{48}	—	February 8, 2011	Mount Lemmon	Mount Lemmon Survey	·	1.5 km	MPC · JPL
500218	2012 HQ_{48}	—	April 15, 2012	Haleakala	Pan-STARRS 1	·	1.1 km	MPC · JPL
500219	2012 HZ_{48}	—	April 21, 2012	Haleakala	Pan-STARRS 1	·	1.7 km	MPC · JPL
500220	2012 HV_{57}	—	January 6, 2012	Haleakala	Pan-STARRS 1	·	1.8 km	MPC · JPL
500221	2012 HS_{64}	—	March 28, 2012	Kitt Peak	Spacewatch	EUN	1 km	MPC · JPL
500222	2012 HD_{69}	—	October 26, 2009	La Sagra	OAM	·	1.8 km	MPC · JPL
500223	2012 HM_{69}	—	April 22, 2012	Kitt Peak	Spacewatch	·	1.8 km	MPC · JPL
500224	2012 HM_{74}	—	April 29, 2008	Mount Lemmon	Mount Lemmon Survey	·	790 m	MPC · JPL
500225	2012 HU_{77}	—	April 29, 2012	Mount Lemmon	Mount Lemmon Survey	BRG	1.2 km	MPC · JPL
500226	2012 HC_{79}	—	August 8, 2008	La Sagra	OAM	·	1.3 km	MPC · JPL
500227	2012 JM	—	April 29, 2012	Catalina	CSS	·	1.1 km	MPC · JPL
500228	2012 JV_{1}	—	April 18, 2012	Kitt Peak	Spacewatch	·	1.1 km	MPC · JPL
500229	2012 JA_{2}	—	April 29, 2012	Kitt Peak	Spacewatch	KON	2.2 km	MPC · JPL
500230	2012 JR_{2}	—	May 28, 2008	Mount Lemmon	Mount Lemmon Survey	·	850 m	MPC · JPL
500231	2012 JW_{2}	—	April 20, 2012	Kitt Peak	Spacewatch	·	1.4 km	MPC · JPL
500232	2012 JE_{7}	—	April 17, 2012	Kitt Peak	Spacewatch	·	940 m	MPC · JPL
500233	2012 JL_{7}	—	April 21, 2012	Mount Lemmon	Mount Lemmon Survey	·	1.3 km	MPC · JPL
500234	2012 JK_{13}	—	February 5, 2011	Haleakala	Pan-STARRS 1	·	1.5 km	MPC · JPL
500235	2012 JH_{16}	—	February 5, 2011	Kitt Peak	Spacewatch	TIN	860 m	MPC · JPL
500236	2012 JC_{17}	—	April 15, 2012	Haleakala	Pan-STARRS 1	·	1.0 km	MPC · JPL
500237	2012 JS_{23}	—	April 30, 2012	Mount Lemmon	Mount Lemmon Survey	·	1.4 km	MPC · JPL
500238	2012 JG_{24}	—	May 12, 2012	Siding Spring	SSS	·	1.5 km	MPC · JPL
500239	2012 JL_{25}	—	November 15, 2006	Kitt Peak	Spacewatch	·	1.1 km	MPC · JPL
500240	2012 JE_{27}	—	March 28, 2012	Mount Lemmon	Mount Lemmon Survey	·	1.3 km	MPC · JPL
500241	2012 JT_{28}	—	April 29, 2008	Mount Lemmon	Mount Lemmon Survey	·	2.4 km	MPC · JPL
500242	2012 JF_{33}	—	April 27, 2012	Haleakala	Pan-STARRS 1	·	1.2 km	MPC · JPL
500243	2012 JG_{38}	—	April 16, 2012	Kitt Peak	Spacewatch	·	1.1 km	MPC · JPL
500244	2012 JW_{38}	—	May 1, 2012	Mount Lemmon	Mount Lemmon Survey	·	1.1 km	MPC · JPL
500245	2012 JL_{43}	—	October 2, 2008	Mount Lemmon	Mount Lemmon Survey	·	1.4 km	MPC · JPL
500246	2012 JO_{52}	—	October 31, 2005	Mount Lemmon	Mount Lemmon Survey	·	1.4 km	MPC · JPL
500247	2012 JB_{56}	—	April 17, 2012	Kitt Peak	Spacewatch	·	980 m	MPC · JPL
500248	2012 JV_{63}	—	April 17, 2012	Kitt Peak	Spacewatch	·	1.3 km	MPC · JPL
500249	2012 JY_{65}	—	May 15, 2012	Haleakala	Pan-STARRS 1	·	1.4 km	MPC · JPL
500250	2012 KE_{5}	—	February 10, 2011	Mount Lemmon	Mount Lemmon Survey	NEM	1.9 km	MPC · JPL
500251	2012 KA_{10}	—	April 1, 2008	Kitt Peak	Spacewatch	·	1.1 km	MPC · JPL
500252	2012 KU_{10}	—	April 21, 2012	Mount Lemmon	Mount Lemmon Survey	·	1.1 km	MPC · JPL
500253	2012 KA_{15}	—	April 15, 2012	Haleakala	Pan-STARRS 1	·	1.2 km	MPC · JPL
500254	2012 KW_{15}	—	January 10, 2011	Mount Lemmon	Mount Lemmon Survey	·	1.5 km	MPC · JPL
500255	2012 KM_{27}	—	April 28, 2012	Mount Lemmon	Mount Lemmon Survey	·	1.0 km	MPC · JPL
500256	2012 KP_{34}	—	May 16, 2012	Mount Lemmon	Mount Lemmon Survey	·	1.7 km	MPC · JPL
500257	2012 KQ_{46}	—	February 13, 2011	Mount Lemmon	Mount Lemmon Survey	·	1.9 km	MPC · JPL
500258	2012 KP_{48}	—	May 20, 2012	Mount Lemmon	Mount Lemmon Survey	EUN	1.3 km	MPC · JPL
500259	2012 KE_{49}	—	May 29, 2012	Mount Lemmon	Mount Lemmon Survey	·	1.8 km	MPC · JPL
500260	2012 KF_{49}	—	May 15, 2012	Haleakala	Pan-STARRS 1	·	1.7 km	MPC · JPL
500261	2012 KN_{49}	—	May 31, 2012	Mount Lemmon	Mount Lemmon Survey	·	1.2 km	MPC · JPL
500262	2012 KV_{49}	—	May 15, 2012	Haleakala	Pan-STARRS 1	·	1.3 km	MPC · JPL
500263	2012 KJ_{51}	—	May 14, 2012	Haleakala	Pan-STARRS 1	·	1.6 km	MPC · JPL
500264	2012 LC_{9}	—	February 25, 2011	Mount Lemmon	Mount Lemmon Survey	·	1.9 km	MPC · JPL
500265	2012 LN_{10}	—	June 14, 2012	Mount Lemmon	Mount Lemmon Survey	·	1.3 km	MPC · JPL
500266	2012 LK_{12}	—	May 15, 2012	Haleakala	Pan-STARRS 1	·	1.5 km	MPC · JPL
500267	2012 LL_{13}	—	May 16, 2012	Haleakala	Pan-STARRS 1	EUN	930 m	MPC · JPL
500268	2012 LH_{14}	—	February 7, 2011	Mount Lemmon	Mount Lemmon Survey	·	1.7 km	MPC · JPL
500269	2012 LN_{15}	—	May 21, 2012	Haleakala	Pan-STARRS 1	·	1.8 km	MPC · JPL
500270	2012 LW_{17}	—	May 15, 2012	Haleakala	Pan-STARRS 1	EUN	1.1 km	MPC · JPL
500271	2012 LN_{19}	—	May 29, 2012	Mount Lemmon	Mount Lemmon Survey	EUN	1.2 km	MPC · JPL
500272	2012 MC_{3}	—	May 16, 2012	Haleakala	Pan-STARRS 1	HNS	940 m	MPC · JPL
500273	2012 MT_{3}	—	June 12, 2012	Kitt Peak	Spacewatch	·	2.0 km	MPC · JPL
500274	2012 MV_{7}	—	November 16, 2009	Mount Lemmon	Mount Lemmon Survey	·	1.7 km	MPC · JPL
500275	2012 MS_{8}	—	March 7, 2003	Socorro	LINEAR	EUN	1.4 km	MPC · JPL
500276	2012 PK_{2}	—	August 8, 2012	Haleakala	Pan-STARRS 1	·	2.1 km	MPC · JPL
500277	2012 PQ_{2}	—	August 8, 2012	Haleakala	Pan-STARRS 1	EOS	1.5 km	MPC · JPL
500278	2012 PM_{3}	—	August 8, 2012	Haleakala	Pan-STARRS 1	EMA	3.0 km	MPC · JPL
500279	2012 PL_{9}	—	March 29, 2011	Mount Lemmon	Mount Lemmon Survey	·	2.2 km	MPC · JPL
500280	2012 PU_{10}	—	August 9, 2012	Haleakala	Pan-STARRS 1	·	2.4 km	MPC · JPL
500281	2012 PD_{13}	—	August 10, 2012	Kitt Peak	Spacewatch	·	2.2 km	MPC · JPL
500282	2012 PP_{13}	—	December 30, 2008	Mount Lemmon	Mount Lemmon Survey	EOS	2.1 km	MPC · JPL
500283	2012 PF_{14}	—	August 10, 2012	Kitt Peak	Spacewatch	·	2.8 km	MPC · JPL
500284	2012 PB_{16}	—	February 7, 2006	Kitt Peak	Spacewatch	H	360 m	MPC · JPL
500285	2012 PG_{18}	—	February 2, 2006	Kitt Peak	Spacewatch	H	540 m	MPC · JPL
500286	2012 PU_{18}	—	August 11, 2012	Haleakala	Pan-STARRS 1	H	670 m	MPC · JPL
500287	2012 PQ_{23}	—	May 29, 2012	Mount Lemmon	Mount Lemmon Survey	·	2.4 km	MPC · JPL
500288	2012 PG_{24}	—	April 24, 2003	Anderson Mesa	LONEOS	·	1.5 km	MPC · JPL
500289	2012 PY_{34}	—	October 8, 2007	Catalina	CSS	EMA	3.3 km	MPC · JPL
500290	2012 PA_{37}	—	April 13, 2011	Mount Lemmon	Mount Lemmon Survey	·	2.2 km	MPC · JPL
500291	2012 PB_{38}	—	September 5, 2008	Kitt Peak	Spacewatch	·	1.6 km	MPC · JPL
500292	2012 PK_{43}	—	September 14, 2007	Kitt Peak	Spacewatch	·	1.4 km	MPC · JPL
500293	2012 PW_{43}	—	August 14, 2012	Haleakala	Pan-STARRS 1	·	3.0 km	MPC · JPL
500294	2012 QF_{2}	—	August 16, 2012	Haleakala	Pan-STARRS 1	H	520 m	MPC · JPL
500295	2012 QW_{7}	—	April 1, 2011	Mount Lemmon	Mount Lemmon Survey	·	1.8 km	MPC · JPL
500296	2012 QU_{13}	—	August 16, 2012	Haleakala	Pan-STARRS 1	·	2.6 km	MPC · JPL
500297	2012 QT_{17}	—	August 8, 2012	Haleakala	Pan-STARRS 1	H	400 m	MPC · JPL
500298	2012 QR_{21}	—	August 14, 2012	Kitt Peak	Spacewatch	EOS	1.8 km	MPC · JPL
500299	2012 QC_{22}	—	August 14, 2012	Kitt Peak	Spacewatch	·	1.7 km	MPC · JPL
500300	2012 QY_{27}	—	October 8, 2007	Kitt Peak	Spacewatch	·	2.1 km	MPC · JPL

== 500301–500400 ==
back to top

Designation			Discovery			Properties		Ref
Permanent	Provisional	Named after	Date	Site	Discoverer(s)	Category	Diam.	Ref
500301	2012 QW_{28}	—	December 31, 2008	Kitt Peak	Spacewatch	·	2.7 km	MPC · JPL
500302	2012 QQ_{31}	—	August 13, 2012	Kitt Peak	Spacewatch	·	3.5 km	MPC · JPL
500303	2012 QR_{34}	—	January 16, 2009	Kitt Peak	Spacewatch	EOS	1.4 km	MPC · JPL
500304	2012 QQ_{39}	—	August 26, 2012	Haleakala	Pan-STARRS 1	EOS	1.8 km	MPC · JPL
500305	2012 QK_{42}	—	January 10, 2011	Kitt Peak	Spacewatch	H	490 m	MPC · JPL
500306	2012 QY_{46}	—	September 9, 2007	Kitt Peak	Spacewatch	EOS	1.9 km	MPC · JPL
500307	2012 QB_{49}	—	October 25, 2003	Kitt Peak	Spacewatch	·	1.9 km	MPC · JPL
500308	2012 QA_{52}	—	August 26, 2012	Haleakala	Pan-STARRS 1	GEF	1.1 km	MPC · JPL
500309	2012 RY	—	August 13, 2012	Haleakala	Pan-STARRS 1	·	2.4 km	MPC · JPL
500310	2012 RD_{3}	—	August 26, 2012	Haleakala	Pan-STARRS 1	·	2.5 km	MPC · JPL
500311	2012 RL_{3}	—	August 12, 2012	Kitt Peak	Spacewatch	INA	2.6 km	MPC · JPL
500312	2012 RN_{4}	—	November 3, 2007	Mount Lemmon	Mount Lemmon Survey	·	2.8 km	MPC · JPL
500313	2012 RE_{14}	—	September 14, 2012	La Sagra	OAM	TIN	1.0 km	MPC · JPL
500314	2012 RX_{21}	—	October 17, 2007	Mount Lemmon	Mount Lemmon Survey	·	2.1 km	MPC · JPL
500315	2012 RB_{22}	—	January 20, 2009	Catalina	CSS	·	3.5 km	MPC · JPL
500316	2012 RS_{23}	—	August 18, 2006	Kitt Peak	Spacewatch	·	2.2 km	MPC · JPL
500317	2012 RE_{24}	—	September 19, 2001	Socorro	LINEAR	·	2.9 km	MPC · JPL
500318	2012 RS_{28}	—	October 7, 2007	Catalina	CSS	·	1.6 km	MPC · JPL
500319	2012 RV_{31}	—	August 25, 2012	Haleakala	Pan-STARRS 1	·	3.0 km	MPC · JPL
500320	2012 RQ_{34}	—	September 15, 2012	Kitt Peak	Spacewatch	VER	2.5 km	MPC · JPL
500321	2012 RD_{35}	—	September 15, 2012	Kitt Peak	Spacewatch	·	2.5 km	MPC · JPL
500322	2012 RM_{40}	—	May 7, 2006	Mount Lemmon	Mount Lemmon Survey	AGN	1.4 km	MPC · JPL
500323	2012 RE_{43}	—	August 13, 2012	Haleakala	Pan-STARRS 1	EOS	1.6 km	MPC · JPL
500324	2012 SF	—	April 30, 2011	Haleakala	Pan-STARRS 1	·	1.6 km	MPC · JPL
500325	2012 SQ	—	September 13, 2007	Catalina	CSS	H	410 m	MPC · JPL
500326	2012 SW_{7}	—	August 26, 2012	Haleakala	Pan-STARRS 1	·	1.7 km	MPC · JPL
500327	2012 SY_{8}	—	September 17, 2012	Mount Lemmon	Mount Lemmon Survey	·	2.1 km	MPC · JPL
500328	2012 SY_{14}	—	October 10, 2007	Kitt Peak	Spacewatch	H	450 m	MPC · JPL
500329	2012 SN_{16}	—	September 17, 2012	Kitt Peak	Spacewatch	·	1.6 km	MPC · JPL
500330	2012 SZ_{20}	—	August 26, 2012	Haleakala	Pan-STARRS 1	·	2.0 km	MPC · JPL
500331	2012 SU_{23}	—	September 17, 2012	Mount Lemmon	Mount Lemmon Survey	EOS	1.6 km	MPC · JPL
500332	2012 SE_{24}	—	January 31, 2009	Mount Lemmon	Mount Lemmon Survey	·	2.2 km	MPC · JPL
500333	2012 SF_{27}	—	September 18, 2012	Kitt Peak	Spacewatch	·	2.2 km	MPC · JPL
500334	2012 SD_{39}	—	August 26, 2012	Haleakala	Pan-STARRS 1	·	2.5 km	MPC · JPL
500335	2012 SS_{40}	—	August 26, 2012	Haleakala	Pan-STARRS 1	·	1.9 km	MPC · JPL
500336	2012 SD_{41}	—	August 26, 2012	Haleakala	Pan-STARRS 1	·	2.0 km	MPC · JPL
500337	2012 SY_{45}	—	March 13, 2010	Mount Lemmon	Mount Lemmon Survey	·	1.6 km	MPC · JPL
500338	2012 SU_{49}	—	October 10, 2007	Mount Lemmon	Mount Lemmon Survey	EOS	1.5 km	MPC · JPL
500339	2012 SH_{52}	—	November 13, 2007	Mount Lemmon	Mount Lemmon Survey	·	2.7 km	MPC · JPL
500340	2012 SH_{54}	—	February 17, 2010	Kitt Peak	Spacewatch	·	2.8 km	MPC · JPL
500341	2012 SW_{55}	—	November 9, 2007	Catalina	CSS	·	2.1 km	MPC · JPL
500342	2012 SM_{56}	—	April 21, 2011	Haleakala	Pan-STARRS 1	H	470 m	MPC · JPL
500343	2012 SZ_{58}	—	September 27, 2012	Catalina	CSS	H	530 m	MPC · JPL
500344	2012 SZ_{62}	—	November 5, 2007	Kitt Peak	Spacewatch	HYG	2.4 km	MPC · JPL
500345	2012 SJ_{65}	—	August 10, 2007	Kitt Peak	Spacewatch	KOR	1.1 km	MPC · JPL
500346	2012 TW_{1}	—	October 11, 2007	Kitt Peak	Spacewatch	·	2.6 km	MPC · JPL
500347	2012 TY_{1}	—	October 20, 2007	Kitt Peak	Spacewatch	·	1.5 km	MPC · JPL
500348	2012 TH_{4}	—	October 5, 2012	Haleakala	Pan-STARRS 1	EUP	4.3 km	MPC · JPL
500349	2012 TX_{6}	—	October 5, 2012	Mount Lemmon	Mount Lemmon Survey	·	2.2 km	MPC · JPL
500350	2012 TG_{10}	—	October 14, 2001	Socorro	LINEAR	·	1.9 km	MPC · JPL
500351	2012 TQ_{10}	—	September 19, 2012	Mount Lemmon	Mount Lemmon Survey	·	2.6 km	MPC · JPL
500352	2012 TH_{11}	—	August 28, 2012	Mount Lemmon	Mount Lemmon Survey	·	2.6 km	MPC · JPL
500353	2012 TL_{11}	—	September 23, 2012	Mount Lemmon	Mount Lemmon Survey	EUP	3.1 km	MPC · JPL
500354	2012 TE_{13}	—	October 15, 2007	Mount Lemmon	Mount Lemmon Survey	·	1.9 km	MPC · JPL
500355	2012 TR_{14}	—	March 6, 2011	Catalina	CSS	H	590 m	MPC · JPL
500356	2012 TG_{18}	—	November 5, 2007	Mount Lemmon	Mount Lemmon Survey	THM	1.8 km	MPC · JPL
500357	2012 TT_{18}	—	November 19, 2007	Kitt Peak	Spacewatch	THM	1.6 km	MPC · JPL
500358	2012 TA_{25}	—	April 9, 2010	Mount Lemmon	Mount Lemmon Survey	·	2.7 km	MPC · JPL
500359	2012 TC_{28}	—	September 22, 2012	Kitt Peak	Spacewatch	·	2.6 km	MPC · JPL
500360	2012 TF_{33}	—	August 25, 2001	Socorro	LINEAR	·	2.1 km	MPC · JPL
500361	2012 TG_{33}	—	September 16, 2012	Kitt Peak	Spacewatch	·	2.9 km	MPC · JPL
500362	2012 TP_{33}	—	September 19, 2001	Socorro	LINEAR	·	1.8 km	MPC · JPL
500363	2012 TG_{34}	—	January 30, 2011	Haleakala	Pan-STARRS 1	GEF	1.7 km	MPC · JPL
500364	2012 TQ_{34}	—	August 13, 2012	Kitt Peak	Spacewatch	·	2.6 km	MPC · JPL
500365	2012 TT_{36}	—	September 13, 2007	Kitt Peak	Spacewatch	·	1.3 km	MPC · JPL
500366	2012 TM_{37}	—	September 21, 2012	Catalina	CSS	·	2.9 km	MPC · JPL
500367	2012 TR_{37}	—	October 6, 2012	Haleakala	Pan-STARRS 1	·	3.4 km	MPC · JPL
500368	2012 TS_{39}	—	October 8, 2012	Mount Lemmon	Mount Lemmon Survey	·	3.3 km	MPC · JPL
500369	2012 TV_{40}	—	July 12, 2010	WISE	WISE	·	2.3 km	MPC · JPL
500370	2012 TD_{42}	—	February 16, 2009	La Sagra	OAM	·	3.1 km	MPC · JPL
500371	2012 TC_{46}	—	August 27, 2006	Kitt Peak	Spacewatch	VER	2.3 km	MPC · JPL
500372	2012 TE_{49}	—	October 16, 2007	Mount Lemmon	Mount Lemmon Survey	·	1.8 km	MPC · JPL
500373	2012 TM_{54}	—	October 6, 2012	Kitt Peak	Spacewatch	·	3.2 km	MPC · JPL
500374	2012 TB_{55}	—	October 6, 2012	Kitt Peak	Spacewatch	·	3.5 km	MPC · JPL
500375	2012 TX_{55}	—	April 9, 2010	Kitt Peak	Spacewatch	·	3.9 km	MPC · JPL
500376	2012 TT_{57}	—	September 19, 2012	Mount Lemmon	Mount Lemmon Survey	·	1.7 km	MPC · JPL
500377	2012 TB_{59}	—	October 8, 2012	Mount Lemmon	Mount Lemmon Survey	·	2.5 km	MPC · JPL
500378	2012 TC_{59}	—	March 13, 2010	Kitt Peak	Spacewatch	EOS	1.9 km	MPC · JPL
500379	2012 TX_{59}	—	September 18, 1995	Kitt Peak	Spacewatch	·	2.4 km	MPC · JPL
500380	2012 TK_{65}	—	January 20, 2009	Kitt Peak	Spacewatch	VER	2.3 km	MPC · JPL
500381	2012 TM_{65}	—	October 8, 2012	Mount Lemmon	Mount Lemmon Survey	·	1.9 km	MPC · JPL
500382	2012 TN_{68}	—	August 28, 2006	Kitt Peak	Spacewatch	THM	1.7 km	MPC · JPL
500383	2012 TR_{69}	—	October 20, 1995	Kitt Peak	Spacewatch	LIX	3.3 km	MPC · JPL
500384	2012 TE_{70}	—	October 8, 2012	Haleakala	Pan-STARRS 1	THM	2.5 km	MPC · JPL
500385	2012 TG_{80}	—	October 14, 2001	Kitt Peak	Spacewatch	·	2.0 km	MPC · JPL
500386	2012 TP_{81}	—	November 1, 2007	Kitt Peak	Spacewatch	·	2.1 km	MPC · JPL
500387	2012 TX_{83}	—	October 6, 2012	Mount Lemmon	Mount Lemmon Survey	·	1.9 km	MPC · JPL
500388	2012 TP_{84}	—	March 17, 2004	Kitt Peak	Spacewatch	·	2.5 km	MPC · JPL
500389	2012 TF_{85}	—	October 6, 2012	Mount Lemmon	Mount Lemmon Survey	·	2.1 km	MPC · JPL
500390	2012 TX_{86}	—	September 16, 2012	Kitt Peak	Spacewatch	·	2.3 km	MPC · JPL
500391	2012 TA_{87}	—	November 18, 2007	Mount Lemmon	Mount Lemmon Survey	·	2.4 km	MPC · JPL
500392	2012 TK_{88}	—	September 22, 1995	Kitt Peak	Spacewatch	THM	1.9 km	MPC · JPL
500393	2012 TC_{89}	—	October 6, 2012	Haleakala	Pan-STARRS 1	·	2.3 km	MPC · JPL
500394	2012 TT_{90}	—	October 7, 2012	Haleakala	Pan-STARRS 1	·	2.2 km	MPC · JPL
500395	2012 TT_{91}	—	October 15, 2007	Mount Lemmon	Mount Lemmon Survey	·	1.7 km	MPC · JPL
500396	2012 TY_{91}	—	October 7, 2012	Haleakala	Pan-STARRS 1	EOS	2.0 km	MPC · JPL
500397	2012 TF_{92}	—	October 7, 2012	Haleakala	Pan-STARRS 1	HOF	2.2 km	MPC · JPL
500398	2012 TO_{93}	—	November 19, 2007	Kitt Peak	Spacewatch	VER	2.5 km	MPC · JPL
500399	2012 TY_{94}	—	November 4, 2007	Kitt Peak	Spacewatch	·	1.6 km	MPC · JPL
500400	2012 TN_{97}	—	October 8, 2012	Kitt Peak	Spacewatch	·	2.4 km	MPC · JPL

== 500401–500500 ==
back to top

Designation			Discovery			Properties		Ref
Permanent	Provisional	Named after	Date	Site	Discoverer(s)	Category	Diam.	Ref
500401	2012 TU_{97}	—	September 16, 2012	Kitt Peak	Spacewatch	·	2.4 km	MPC · JPL
500402	2012 TV_{97}	—	September 23, 2001	Kitt Peak	Spacewatch	·	2.1 km	MPC · JPL
500403	2012 TX_{97}	—	November 7, 2007	Kitt Peak	Spacewatch	·	1.7 km	MPC · JPL
500404	2012 TE_{100}	—	November 8, 2007	Kitt Peak	Spacewatch	·	3.0 km	MPC · JPL
500405	2012 TW_{108}	—	February 18, 2010	Mount Lemmon	Mount Lemmon Survey	·	2.7 km	MPC · JPL
500406	2012 TB_{109}	—	October 10, 2012	Mount Lemmon	Mount Lemmon Survey	EOS	1.6 km	MPC · JPL
500407	2012 TC_{110}	—	September 25, 2007	Mount Lemmon	Mount Lemmon Survey	·	2.0 km	MPC · JPL
500408	2012 TF_{110}	—	August 27, 2006	Kitt Peak	Spacewatch	·	2.2 km	MPC · JPL
500409	2012 TT_{111}	—	August 28, 2006	Kitt Peak	Spacewatch	VER	2.0 km	MPC · JPL
500410	2012 TD_{112}	—	October 17, 2007	Mount Lemmon	Mount Lemmon Survey	EOS	1.3 km	MPC · JPL
500411	2012 TN_{114}	—	August 18, 2006	Kitt Peak	Spacewatch	VER	2.0 km	MPC · JPL
500412	2012 TY_{114}	—	November 4, 2007	Mount Lemmon	Mount Lemmon Survey	·	1.6 km	MPC · JPL
500413	2012 TA_{115}	—	November 11, 2007	Mount Lemmon	Mount Lemmon Survey	·	2.4 km	MPC · JPL
500414	2012 TB_{115}	—	October 10, 2012	Mount Lemmon	Mount Lemmon Survey	·	3.3 km	MPC · JPL
500415	2012 TA_{116}	—	November 5, 2007	Kitt Peak	Spacewatch	·	2.2 km	MPC · JPL
500416	2012 TM_{116}	—	December 22, 2008	Kitt Peak	Spacewatch	·	1.9 km	MPC · JPL
500417	2012 TV_{121}	—	October 11, 2007	Kitt Peak	Spacewatch	·	1.8 km	MPC · JPL
500418	2012 TZ_{128}	—	November 4, 2007	Kitt Peak	Spacewatch	EOS	1.4 km	MPC · JPL
500419	2012 TF_{131}	—	October 12, 1996	Kitt Peak	Spacewatch	·	2.3 km	MPC · JPL
500420	2012 TJ_{131}	—	November 8, 2007	Kitt Peak	Spacewatch	THM	1.7 km	MPC · JPL
500421	2012 TM_{134}	—	September 17, 2012	Kitt Peak	Spacewatch	·	1.9 km	MPC · JPL
500422	2012 TO_{136}	—	September 10, 2007	Mount Lemmon	Mount Lemmon Survey	H	450 m	MPC · JPL
500423	2012 TX_{136}	—	October 8, 2012	Mount Lemmon	Mount Lemmon Survey	·	2.3 km	MPC · JPL
500424	2012 TH_{141}	—	November 18, 2007	Mount Lemmon	Mount Lemmon Survey	·	1.9 km	MPC · JPL
500425	2012 TO_{141}	—	February 19, 2010	Mount Lemmon	Mount Lemmon Survey	·	2.9 km	MPC · JPL
500426	2012 TP_{142}	—	October 6, 2012	Haleakala	Pan-STARRS 1	·	2.6 km	MPC · JPL
500427	2012 TD_{144}	—	December 29, 2008	Kitt Peak	Spacewatch	·	1.6 km	MPC · JPL
500428	2012 TY_{144}	—	September 16, 2012	Kitt Peak	Spacewatch	·	1.9 km	MPC · JPL
500429	2012 TK_{145}	—	April 11, 2011	Haleakala	Pan-STARRS 1	H	590 m	MPC · JPL
500430	2012 TS_{148}	—	April 9, 2006	Mount Lemmon	Mount Lemmon Survey	H	470 m	MPC · JPL
500431	2012 TF_{149}	—	November 16, 1995	Kitt Peak	Spacewatch	THB	2.3 km	MPC · JPL
500432	2012 TG_{151}	—	October 13, 2001	Kitt Peak	Spacewatch	·	2.1 km	MPC · JPL
500433	2012 TO_{152}	—	September 20, 2001	Kitt Peak	Spacewatch	HYG	1.7 km	MPC · JPL
500434	2012 TX_{154}	—	October 16, 2007	Mount Lemmon	Mount Lemmon Survey	·	1.9 km	MPC · JPL
500435	2012 TY_{154}	—	October 16, 2007	Mount Lemmon	Mount Lemmon Survey	EOS	1.6 km	MPC · JPL
500436	2012 TK_{155}	—	May 16, 2005	Mount Lemmon	Mount Lemmon Survey	·	2.4 km	MPC · JPL
500437	2012 TU_{160}	—	November 15, 2007	Mount Lemmon	Mount Lemmon Survey	·	2.0 km	MPC · JPL
500438	2012 TO_{164}	—	October 8, 2012	Haleakala	Pan-STARRS 1	·	2.1 km	MPC · JPL
500439	2012 TC_{166}	—	September 23, 2012	Kitt Peak	Spacewatch	·	2.1 km	MPC · JPL
500440	2012 TA_{168}	—	October 8, 2012	Haleakala	Pan-STARRS 1	·	1.9 km	MPC · JPL
500441	2012 TM_{170}	—	August 21, 2006	Kitt Peak	Spacewatch	THM	2.1 km	MPC · JPL
500442	2012 TP_{171}	—	November 7, 2007	Kitt Peak	Spacewatch	·	2.3 km	MPC · JPL
500443	2012 TJ_{172}	—	April 6, 2010	Mount Lemmon	Mount Lemmon Survey	·	2.0 km	MPC · JPL
500444	2012 TQ_{173}	—	October 19, 2007	Kitt Peak	Spacewatch	·	2.2 km	MPC · JPL
500445	2012 TE_{183}	—	September 21, 2012	Kitt Peak	Spacewatch	EOS	1.5 km	MPC · JPL
500446	2012 TV_{184}	—	October 8, 2012	Mount Lemmon	Mount Lemmon Survey	EOS	1.5 km	MPC · JPL
500447	2012 TB_{186}	—	October 9, 2012	Mount Lemmon	Mount Lemmon Survey	URS	3.7 km	MPC · JPL
500448	2012 TX_{192}	—	October 11, 2007	Kitt Peak	Spacewatch	EOS	1.8 km	MPC · JPL
500449	2012 TJ_{198}	—	November 2, 2007	Kitt Peak	Spacewatch	·	1.6 km	MPC · JPL
500450	2012 TT_{198}	—	September 16, 2012	Kitt Peak	Spacewatch	·	2.5 km	MPC · JPL
500451	2012 TG_{199}	—	November 5, 2007	Mount Lemmon	Mount Lemmon Survey	·	1.7 km	MPC · JPL
500452	2012 TT_{200}	—	October 9, 2007	Mount Lemmon	Mount Lemmon Survey	·	1.3 km	MPC · JPL
500453	2012 TD_{202}	—	October 11, 2012	Mount Lemmon	Mount Lemmon Survey	·	2.2 km	MPC · JPL
500454	2012 TS_{203}	—	September 18, 2012	Kitt Peak	Spacewatch	THM	2.0 km	MPC · JPL
500455	2012 TC_{205}	—	September 21, 2012	Mount Lemmon	Mount Lemmon Survey	·	970 m	MPC · JPL
500456	2012 TO_{206}	—	November 20, 2007	Mount Lemmon	Mount Lemmon Survey	EOS	1.7 km	MPC · JPL
500457	2012 TZ_{206}	—	September 14, 2007	Mount Lemmon	Mount Lemmon Survey	·	2.1 km	MPC · JPL
500458	2012 TD_{209}	—	January 29, 2009	Kitt Peak	Spacewatch	·	2.1 km	MPC · JPL
500459	2012 TP_{210}	—	March 20, 2010	Mount Lemmon	Mount Lemmon Survey	·	3.8 km	MPC · JPL
500460	2012 TV_{210}	—	February 22, 2009	Kitt Peak	Spacewatch	·	2.7 km	MPC · JPL
500461	2012 TL_{213}	—	August 21, 2006	Kitt Peak	Spacewatch	THM	1.9 km	MPC · JPL
500462	2012 TB_{218}	—	October 20, 2007	Mount Lemmon	Mount Lemmon Survey	·	2.0 km	MPC · JPL
500463	2012 TZ_{218}	—	May 11, 2010	Kitt Peak	Spacewatch	·	2.5 km	MPC · JPL
500464	2012 TW_{219}	—	December 20, 2007	Kitt Peak	Spacewatch	·	2.2 km	MPC · JPL
500465	2012 TB_{221}	—	October 7, 2007	Mount Lemmon	Mount Lemmon Survey	·	1.3 km	MPC · JPL
500466	2012 TO_{221}	—	October 10, 2007	Mount Lemmon	Mount Lemmon Survey	·	2.7 km	MPC · JPL
500467	2012 TR_{222}	—	December 20, 2007	Mount Lemmon	Mount Lemmon Survey	·	2.8 km	MPC · JPL
500468	2012 TD_{226}	—	October 9, 2007	Mount Lemmon	Mount Lemmon Survey	·	2.0 km	MPC · JPL
500469	2012 TS_{226}	—	January 25, 2009	Kitt Peak	Spacewatch	·	1.4 km	MPC · JPL
500470	2012 TX_{227}	—	November 12, 2007	Mount Lemmon	Mount Lemmon Survey	·	1.9 km	MPC · JPL
500471	2012 TB_{228}	—	July 22, 1995	Kitt Peak	Spacewatch	·	1.9 km	MPC · JPL
500472	2012 TC_{234}	—	October 6, 2012	Haleakala	Pan-STARRS 1	H	440 m	MPC · JPL
500473	2012 TQ_{234}	—	October 20, 2007	Mount Lemmon	Mount Lemmon Survey	·	2.2 km	MPC · JPL
500474	2012 TE_{236}	—	October 7, 2012	Haleakala	Pan-STARRS 1	·	2.0 km	MPC · JPL
500475	2012 TF_{236}	—	October 7, 2012	Haleakala	Pan-STARRS 1	·	2.7 km	MPC · JPL
500476	2012 TU_{237}	—	October 7, 2012	Haleakala	Pan-STARRS 1	·	2.3 km	MPC · JPL
500477	2012 TY_{239}	—	September 14, 2012	Kitt Peak	Spacewatch	·	1.8 km	MPC · JPL
500478	2012 TT_{241}	—	September 18, 2012	Kitt Peak	Spacewatch	EOS	1.7 km	MPC · JPL
500479	2012 TX_{241}	—	May 21, 2011	Mount Lemmon	Mount Lemmon Survey	·	1.4 km	MPC · JPL
500480	2012 TL_{244}	—	October 8, 2012	Haleakala	Pan-STARRS 1	·	3.0 km	MPC · JPL
500481	2012 TP_{244}	—	March 24, 2006	Mount Lemmon	Mount Lemmon Survey	H	450 m	MPC · JPL
500482	2012 TV_{248}	—	September 15, 2006	Kitt Peak	Spacewatch	VER	2.1 km	MPC · JPL
500483	2012 TZ_{251}	—	April 1, 2010	La Sagra	OAM	·	2.9 km	MPC · JPL
500484	2012 TC_{254}	—	July 28, 2011	Siding Spring	SSS	·	3.2 km	MPC · JPL
500485	2012 TK_{254}	—	January 18, 2009	Mount Lemmon	Mount Lemmon Survey	·	3.7 km	MPC · JPL
500486	2012 TZ_{255}	—	October 10, 2007	Catalina	CSS	·	1.3 km	MPC · JPL
500487	2012 TL_{256}	—	March 26, 1995	Kitt Peak	Spacewatch	·	2.2 km	MPC · JPL
500488	2012 TM_{257}	—	August 19, 2006	Kitt Peak	Spacewatch	·	2.4 km	MPC · JPL
500489	2012 TO_{261}	—	September 16, 2012	Kitt Peak	Spacewatch	·	2.2 km	MPC · JPL
500490	2012 TS_{261}	—	February 14, 2010	WISE	WISE	·	2.1 km	MPC · JPL
500491	2012 TK_{264}	—	October 10, 2007	Kitt Peak	Spacewatch	·	1.5 km	MPC · JPL
500492	2012 TP_{264}	—	November 2, 2007	Mount Lemmon	Mount Lemmon Survey	·	2.1 km	MPC · JPL
500493	2012 TW_{264}	—	September 9, 2007	Mount Lemmon	Mount Lemmon Survey	·	1.7 km	MPC · JPL
500494	2012 TK_{265}	—	September 23, 2012	Kitt Peak	Spacewatch	HYG	2.4 km	MPC · JPL
500495	2012 TH_{267}	—	October 8, 2012	Haleakala	Pan-STARRS 1	·	2.5 km	MPC · JPL
500496	2012 TP_{267}	—	November 7, 2007	Kitt Peak	Spacewatch	EOS	1.7 km	MPC · JPL
500497	2012 TB_{269}	—	August 10, 2007	Kitt Peak	Spacewatch	·	1.2 km	MPC · JPL
500498	2012 TV_{270}	—	October 11, 2012	Haleakala	Pan-STARRS 1	·	1.8 km	MPC · JPL
500499	2012 TP_{273}	—	October 15, 2012	Mount Lemmon	Mount Lemmon Survey	·	1.7 km	MPC · JPL
500500	2012 TJ_{276}	—	October 18, 2007	Kitt Peak	Spacewatch	·	1.9 km	MPC · JPL

== 500501–500600 ==
back to top

Designation			Discovery			Properties		Ref
Permanent	Provisional	Named after	Date	Site	Discoverer(s)	Category	Diam.	Ref
500501	2012 TW_{282}	—	September 18, 2012	Mount Lemmon	Mount Lemmon Survey	TIR	3.0 km	MPC · JPL
500502	2012 TC_{285}	—	October 5, 2012	Kitt Peak	Spacewatch	·	2.6 km	MPC · JPL
500503	2012 TG_{285}	—	August 21, 2006	Kitt Peak	Spacewatch	HYG	2.2 km	MPC · JPL
500504	2012 TX_{285}	—	October 6, 2012	Mount Lemmon	Mount Lemmon Survey	·	2.7 km	MPC · JPL
500505	2012 TU_{286}	—	October 8, 2012	Haleakala	Pan-STARRS 1	·	2.5 km	MPC · JPL
500506	2012 TF_{287}	—	October 9, 2012	Kitt Peak	Spacewatch	·	2.4 km	MPC · JPL
500507	2012 TP_{287}	—	October 9, 2007	Kitt Peak	Spacewatch	·	2.0 km	MPC · JPL
500508	2012 TH_{288}	—	December 16, 2007	Kitt Peak	Spacewatch	EOS	2.0 km	MPC · JPL
500509	2012 TJ_{288}	—	October 10, 2012	Mount Lemmon	Mount Lemmon Survey	·	2.5 km	MPC · JPL
500510	2012 TL_{288}	—	May 25, 2006	Mount Lemmon	Mount Lemmon Survey	·	2.9 km	MPC · JPL
500511	2012 TQ_{288}	—	October 10, 2012	Mount Lemmon	Mount Lemmon Survey	·	2.5 km	MPC · JPL
500512	2012 TV_{288}	—	November 17, 2007	Mount Lemmon	Mount Lemmon Survey	·	2.3 km	MPC · JPL
500513	2012 TE_{289}	—	January 25, 2009	Kitt Peak	Spacewatch	EOS	1.7 km	MPC · JPL
500514	2012 TF_{291}	—	September 19, 2001	Socorro	LINEAR	·	2.3 km	MPC · JPL
500515	2012 TV_{291}	—	October 14, 2012	Kitt Peak	Spacewatch	·	3.1 km	MPC · JPL
500516	2012 TO_{295}	—	February 28, 2009	Kitt Peak	Spacewatch	·	2.8 km	MPC · JPL
500517	2012 TR_{298}	—	October 22, 2006	Mount Lemmon	Mount Lemmon Survey	·	2.6 km	MPC · JPL
500518	2012 TL_{300}	—	August 14, 2012	Haleakala	Pan-STARRS 1	DOR	2.3 km	MPC · JPL
500519	2012 TQ_{302}	—	August 28, 2012	Mount Lemmon	Mount Lemmon Survey	·	3.6 km	MPC · JPL
500520	2012 TA_{304}	—	November 4, 2007	Kitt Peak	Spacewatch	·	1.9 km	MPC · JPL
500521	2012 TB_{306}	—	October 5, 2007	Kitt Peak	Spacewatch	·	1.5 km	MPC · JPL
500522	2012 TZ_{306}	—	October 9, 2007	Catalina	CSS	·	2.6 km	MPC · JPL
500523	2012 TB_{308}	—	September 16, 2006	Catalina	CSS	·	3.3 km	MPC · JPL
500524	2012 TO_{308}	—	September 14, 2006	Catalina	CSS	·	3.0 km	MPC · JPL
500525	2012 TU_{308}	—	September 24, 2012	Mount Lemmon	Mount Lemmon Survey	H	330 m	MPC · JPL
500526	2012 TW_{308}	—	September 20, 2001	Socorro	LINEAR	·	2.6 km	MPC · JPL
500527	2012 TR_{313}	—	September 15, 2012	Catalina	CSS	·	1.3 km	MPC · JPL
500528	2012 TC_{314}	—	November 8, 2007	Mount Lemmon	Mount Lemmon Survey	·	2.2 km	MPC · JPL
500529	2012 TA_{317}	—	October 6, 2012	Haleakala	Pan-STARRS 1	·	2.8 km	MPC · JPL
500530	2012 TG_{320}	—	September 24, 2009	Mount Lemmon	Mount Lemmon Survey	H	620 m	MPC · JPL
500531	2012 TH_{321}	—	October 6, 2012	Haleakala	Pan-STARRS 1	·	2.9 km	MPC · JPL
500532	2012 UT	—	December 16, 2007	Kitt Peak	Spacewatch	·	3.5 km	MPC · JPL
500533	2012 UJ_{2}	—	November 3, 2007	Kitt Peak	Spacewatch	·	2.0 km	MPC · JPL
500534	2012 UK_{2}	—	November 12, 2007	Mount Lemmon	Mount Lemmon Survey	·	1.7 km	MPC · JPL
500535	2012 UM_{14}	—	October 16, 2012	Mount Lemmon	Mount Lemmon Survey	·	1.9 km	MPC · JPL
500536	2012 UY_{14}	—	October 16, 2012	Mount Lemmon	Mount Lemmon Survey	EOS	1.8 km	MPC · JPL
500537	2012 UH_{18}	—	September 17, 2012	Kitt Peak	Spacewatch	H	360 m	MPC · JPL
500538	2012 UN_{21}	—	October 11, 2007	Mount Lemmon	Mount Lemmon Survey	·	1.5 km	MPC · JPL
500539	2012 UX_{22}	—	October 17, 2012	Mount Lemmon	Mount Lemmon Survey	·	2.7 km	MPC · JPL
500540	2012 UR_{24}	—	September 21, 2001	Socorro	LINEAR	·	1.6 km	MPC · JPL
500541	2012 UE_{25}	—	July 26, 2011	Haleakala	Pan-STARRS 1	·	2.6 km	MPC · JPL
500542	2012 US_{25}	—	November 20, 2007	Mount Lemmon	Mount Lemmon Survey	·	2.8 km	MPC · JPL
500543	2012 UX_{25}	—	November 9, 2007	Mount Lemmon	Mount Lemmon Survey	·	1.7 km	MPC · JPL
500544	2012 UE_{27}	—	October 17, 2012	Haleakala	Pan-STARRS 1	·	1.6 km	MPC · JPL
500545	2012 UR_{31}	—	July 28, 2011	Haleakala	Pan-STARRS 1	EOS	2.1 km	MPC · JPL
500546	2012 US_{32}	—	August 28, 2001	Anderson Mesa	LONEOS	T_{j} (2.95)	2.6 km	MPC · JPL
500547	2012 UT_{32}	—	December 19, 2007	Kitt Peak	Spacewatch	·	2.4 km	MPC · JPL
500548	2012 UB_{36}	—	October 2, 2006	Kitt Peak	Spacewatch	·	2.9 km	MPC · JPL
500549	2012 UC_{36}	—	July 22, 2006	Mount Lemmon	Mount Lemmon Survey	THM	2.1 km	MPC · JPL
500550	2012 UF_{38}	—	October 20, 2006	Kitt Peak	Spacewatch	·	2.8 km	MPC · JPL
500551	2012 UR_{40}	—	October 20, 2001	Socorro	LINEAR	THM	2.2 km	MPC · JPL
500552	2012 UA_{41}	—	March 21, 2010	Kitt Peak	Spacewatch	·	2.5 km	MPC · JPL
500553	2012 UG_{42}	—	September 16, 2012	Mount Lemmon	Mount Lemmon Survey	·	2.7 km	MPC · JPL
500554	2012 UE_{43}	—	April 15, 2005	Kitt Peak	Spacewatch	·	4.9 km	MPC · JPL
500555	2012 UG_{46}	—	September 19, 2001	Socorro	LINEAR	·	2.1 km	MPC · JPL
500556	2012 UY_{49}	—	July 21, 2006	Mount Lemmon	Mount Lemmon Survey	HYG	2.3 km	MPC · JPL
500557	2012 UZ_{50}	—	September 14, 2006	Kitt Peak	Spacewatch	THM	2.2 km	MPC · JPL
500558	2012 UE_{51}	—	May 9, 2010	Mount Lemmon	Mount Lemmon Survey	EOS	2.1 km	MPC · JPL
500559	2012 UT_{52}	—	September 22, 2001	Kitt Peak	Spacewatch	·	1.6 km	MPC · JPL
500560	2012 US_{55}	—	October 19, 2012	Haleakala	Pan-STARRS 1	HYG	2.3 km	MPC · JPL
500561	2012 US_{56}	—	October 19, 2012	Haleakala	Pan-STARRS 1	·	2.9 km	MPC · JPL
500562	2012 UD_{58}	—	August 24, 2007	Kitt Peak	Spacewatch	·	1.6 km	MPC · JPL
500563	2012 UN_{58}	—	May 8, 2008	Mount Lemmon	Mount Lemmon Survey	·	550 m	MPC · JPL
500564	2012 UU_{58}	—	March 18, 2009	Kitt Peak	Spacewatch	·	2.8 km	MPC · JPL
500565	2012 UP_{61}	—	October 5, 1999	Socorro	LINEAR	H	490 m	MPC · JPL
500566	2012 UT_{61}	—	October 21, 2012	Haleakala	Pan-STARRS 1	H	340 m	MPC · JPL
500567	2012 UM_{64}	—	October 21, 2006	Mount Lemmon	Mount Lemmon Survey	·	2.5 km	MPC · JPL
500568	2012 UM_{65}	—	September 17, 2006	Kitt Peak	Spacewatch	·	2.7 km	MPC · JPL
500569	2012 UB_{66}	—	September 15, 2006	Kitt Peak	Spacewatch	THM	1.9 km	MPC · JPL
500570	2012 UB_{68}	—	September 18, 2012	Kitt Peak	Spacewatch	H	530 m	MPC · JPL
500571	2012 UX_{70}	—	October 8, 2007	Mount Lemmon	Mount Lemmon Survey	·	1.4 km	MPC · JPL
500572	2012 UX_{77}	—	August 21, 2006	Kitt Peak	Spacewatch	·	2.6 km	MPC · JPL
500573	2012 UA_{79}	—	October 14, 2012	Kitt Peak	Spacewatch	HYG	2.9 km	MPC · JPL
500574	2012 UD_{79}	—	September 21, 1995	Kitt Peak	Spacewatch	·	2.1 km	MPC · JPL
500575	2012 UK_{79}	—	October 6, 2012	Kitt Peak	Spacewatch	EOS	2.0 km	MPC · JPL
500576	2012 UP_{81}	—	October 20, 2007	Mount Lemmon	Mount Lemmon Survey	·	1.5 km	MPC · JPL
500577	2012 UR_{82}	—	July 28, 2011	Haleakala	Pan-STARRS 1	EOS	2.3 km	MPC · JPL
500578	2012 UV_{82}	—	July 25, 2011	Haleakala	Pan-STARRS 1	EOS	1.7 km	MPC · JPL
500579	2012 UZ_{83}	—	July 7, 2010	WISE	WISE	LIX	4.0 km	MPC · JPL
500580	2012 UG_{87}	—	August 1, 2011	Haleakala	Pan-STARRS 1	·	2.4 km	MPC · JPL
500581	2012 UW_{87}	—	September 30, 2006	Kitt Peak	Spacewatch	·	2.1 km	MPC · JPL
500582	2012 UO_{88}	—	October 21, 2012	Haleakala	Pan-STARRS 1	THM	1.8 km	MPC · JPL
500583	2012 UB_{89}	—	December 17, 2007	Kitt Peak	Spacewatch	THM	2.0 km	MPC · JPL
500584	2012 UX_{89}	—	October 21, 2012	Haleakala	Pan-STARRS 1	·	1.0 km	MPC · JPL
500585	2012 UE_{93}	—	October 8, 2012	Haleakala	Pan-STARRS 1	·	2.5 km	MPC · JPL
500586	2012 UL_{95}	—	September 25, 2012	Mount Lemmon	Mount Lemmon Survey	·	2.7 km	MPC · JPL
500587	2012 UX_{95}	—	September 16, 2012	Mount Lemmon	Mount Lemmon Survey	·	2.3 km	MPC · JPL
500588	2012 UU_{97}	—	October 6, 2012	Mount Lemmon	Mount Lemmon Survey	·	2.3 km	MPC · JPL
500589	2012 UX_{99}	—	October 7, 2012	Kitt Peak	Spacewatch	·	1.9 km	MPC · JPL
500590	2012 UK_{100}	—	August 30, 2011	Haleakala	Pan-STARRS 1	·	2.7 km	MPC · JPL
500591	2012 UY_{101}	—	November 13, 2007	Mount Lemmon	Mount Lemmon Survey	·	2.0 km	MPC · JPL
500592	2012 UJ_{104}	—	October 19, 2012	Mount Lemmon	Mount Lemmon Survey	·	3.1 km	MPC · JPL
500593	2012 UN_{106}	—	October 14, 2001	Socorro	LINEAR	EOS	2.0 km	MPC · JPL
500594	2012 UP_{106}	—	September 19, 2012	Mount Lemmon	Mount Lemmon Survey	·	2.1 km	MPC · JPL
500595	2012 UN_{110}	—	April 16, 2008	Mount Lemmon	Mount Lemmon Survey	·	4.1 km	MPC · JPL
500596	2012 UH_{111}	—	October 7, 2012	Kitt Peak	Spacewatch	·	2.3 km	MPC · JPL
500597	2012 UQ_{111}	—	October 8, 2012	Mount Lemmon	Mount Lemmon Survey	H	440 m	MPC · JPL
500598	2012 UF_{114}	—	September 11, 2001	Kitt Peak	Spacewatch	·	2.0 km	MPC · JPL
500599	2012 UX_{118}	—	August 27, 2006	Kitt Peak	Spacewatch	·	2.2 km	MPC · JPL
500600	2012 UW_{119}	—	October 15, 2012	Kitt Peak	Spacewatch	T_{j} (2.99)	3.4 km	MPC · JPL

== 500601–500700 ==
back to top

Designation			Discovery			Properties		Ref
Permanent	Provisional	Named after	Date	Site	Discoverer(s)	Category	Diam.	Ref
500601	2012 UD_{120}	—	November 19, 2007	Mount Lemmon	Mount Lemmon Survey	·	2.8 km	MPC · JPL
500602	2012 UP_{120}	—	November 13, 2007	Kitt Peak	Spacewatch	·	2.3 km	MPC · JPL
500603	2012 UH_{121}	—	March 18, 2010	Kitt Peak	Spacewatch	·	2.2 km	MPC · JPL
500604	2012 UG_{123}	—	November 19, 2001	Socorro	LINEAR	EOS	1.9 km	MPC · JPL
500605	2012 UP_{123}	—	October 22, 2012	Haleakala	Pan-STARRS 1	·	2.8 km	MPC · JPL
500606	2012 UQ_{128}	—	March 17, 2009	Kitt Peak	Spacewatch	URS	2.8 km	MPC · JPL
500607	2012 UF_{130}	—	January 23, 1998	Kitt Peak	Spacewatch	·	2.0 km	MPC · JPL
500608	2012 UK_{132}	—	October 17, 2012	Mount Lemmon	Mount Lemmon Survey	·	2.2 km	MPC · JPL
500609	2012 UG_{135}	—	November 20, 2007	Catalina	CSS	·	1.8 km	MPC · JPL
500610	2012 UK_{138}	—	September 18, 2012	Mount Lemmon	Mount Lemmon Survey	H	410 m	MPC · JPL
500611	2012 UU_{138}	—	January 18, 2009	Kitt Peak	Spacewatch	·	2.1 km	MPC · JPL
500612	2012 UX_{138}	—	October 18, 2012	Mount Lemmon	Mount Lemmon Survey	·	2.3 km	MPC · JPL
500613	2012 UO_{139}	—	January 31, 2009	Kitt Peak	Spacewatch	·	2.9 km	MPC · JPL
500614	2012 UK_{145}	—	August 19, 2006	Kitt Peak	Spacewatch	·	2.1 km	MPC · JPL
500615	2012 UZ_{145}	—	October 19, 2012	Mount Lemmon	Mount Lemmon Survey	·	3.6 km	MPC · JPL
500616	2012 UB_{146}	—	October 19, 2012	Mount Lemmon	Mount Lemmon Survey	·	3.4 km	MPC · JPL
500617	2012 UU_{147}	—	December 18, 2007	Kitt Peak	Spacewatch	·	1.9 km	MPC · JPL
500618	2012 UZ_{147}	—	March 29, 2011	Haleakala	Pan-STARRS 1	H	540 m	MPC · JPL
500619	2012 UH_{149}	—	March 19, 2009	Kitt Peak	Spacewatch	LIX	3.1 km	MPC · JPL
500620	2012 US_{149}	—	August 28, 2012	Mount Lemmon	Mount Lemmon Survey	·	2.4 km	MPC · JPL
500621	2012 UM_{152}	—	December 31, 2007	Kitt Peak	Spacewatch	·	1.7 km	MPC · JPL
500622	2012 UM_{153}	—	October 13, 2012	Kitt Peak	Spacewatch	·	2.1 km	MPC · JPL
500623	2012 UE_{154}	—	October 11, 2012	Haleakala	Pan-STARRS 1	THM	1.8 km	MPC · JPL
500624	2012 UK_{154}	—	September 17, 2006	Kitt Peak	Spacewatch	·	3.0 km	MPC · JPL
500625	2012 UL_{154}	—	October 22, 2012	Mount Lemmon	Mount Lemmon Survey	·	2.7 km	MPC · JPL
500626	2012 UE_{157}	—	February 3, 2009	Kitt Peak	Spacewatch	·	2.7 km	MPC · JPL
500627	2012 UO_{157}	—	October 17, 2012	Mount Lemmon	Mount Lemmon Survey	·	3.0 km	MPC · JPL
500628	2012 UW_{160}	—	November 6, 2007	Kitt Peak	Spacewatch	·	1.2 km	MPC · JPL
500629	2012 UP_{163}	—	October 13, 2012	Kitt Peak	Spacewatch	EOS	1.9 km	MPC · JPL
500630	2012 UU_{163}	—	October 21, 2006	Kitt Peak	Spacewatch	·	2.6 km	MPC · JPL
500631	2012 UT_{164}	—	November 12, 2001	Kitt Peak	Spacewatch	T_{j} (2.99)	3.8 km	MPC · JPL
500632	2012 UZ_{166}	—	February 26, 2009	Calar Alto	F. Hormuth	·	2.6 km	MPC · JPL
500633	2012 UK_{169}	—	November 17, 2001	Socorro	LINEAR	H	490 m	MPC · JPL
500634	2012 UU_{171}	—	May 19, 2006	Mount Lemmon	Mount Lemmon Survey	H	490 m	MPC · JPL
500635	2012 UG_{173}	—	October 14, 2001	Socorro	LINEAR	·	2.7 km	MPC · JPL
500636	2012 VH	—	October 6, 2012	Haleakala	Pan-STARRS 1	·	2.4 km	MPC · JPL
500637	2012 VJ_{1}	—	November 2, 2012	Haleakala	Pan-STARRS 1	EOS	1.5 km	MPC · JPL
500638	2012 VS_{1}	—	June 23, 2012	Siding Spring	SSS	·	680 m	MPC · JPL
500639	2012 VW_{1}	—	September 7, 2004	Kitt Peak	Spacewatch	H	420 m	MPC · JPL
500640	2012 VD_{2}	—	October 16, 2012	Kitt Peak	Spacewatch	H	560 m	MPC · JPL
500641	2012 VK_{3}	—	October 20, 2012	Kitt Peak	Spacewatch	·	2.4 km	MPC · JPL
500642	2012 VD_{4}	—	October 6, 2012	Haleakala	Pan-STARRS 1	·	2.8 km	MPC · JPL
500643	2012 VO_{5}	—	October 9, 2012	Mount Lemmon	Mount Lemmon Survey	·	3.2 km	MPC · JPL
500644	2012 VR_{7}	—	September 15, 2006	Kitt Peak	Spacewatch	·	2.5 km	MPC · JPL
500645	2012 VY_{7}	—	October 18, 2012	Haleakala	Pan-STARRS 1	·	2.2 km	MPC · JPL
500646	2012 VW_{8}	—	October 18, 2012	Haleakala	Pan-STARRS 1	THM	1.9 km	MPC · JPL
500647	2012 VD_{9}	—	October 18, 2012	Haleakala	Pan-STARRS 1	URS	3.4 km	MPC · JPL
500648	2012 VW_{10}	—	October 17, 2001	Kitt Peak	Spacewatch	THM	1.6 km	MPC · JPL
500649	2012 VT_{12}	—	November 2, 2007	Kitt Peak	Spacewatch	·	1.6 km	MPC · JPL
500650	2012 VL_{13}	—	December 17, 2007	Mount Lemmon	Mount Lemmon Survey	·	2.2 km	MPC · JPL
500651	2012 VU_{14}	—	October 6, 2012	Haleakala	Pan-STARRS 1	·	2.8 km	MPC · JPL
500652	2012 VO_{15}	—	September 15, 2007	Mount Lemmon	Mount Lemmon Survey	·	2.1 km	MPC · JPL
500653	2012 VU_{16}	—	November 5, 2012	Haleakala	Pan-STARRS 1	EOS	2.3 km	MPC · JPL
500654	2012 VB_{18}	—	November 6, 2012	Mount Lemmon	Mount Lemmon Survey	·	2.1 km	MPC · JPL
500655	2012 VL_{18}	—	September 15, 2006	Kitt Peak	Spacewatch	·	2.2 km	MPC · JPL
500656	2012 VG_{19}	—	November 8, 2007	Mount Lemmon	Mount Lemmon Survey	·	1.5 km	MPC · JPL
500657	2012 VK_{19}	—	July 18, 2006	Siding Spring	SSS	·	2.7 km	MPC · JPL
500658	2012 VX_{19}	—	August 27, 2006	Kitt Peak	Spacewatch	THM	2.0 km	MPC · JPL
500659	2012 VU_{20}	—	September 25, 2012	Mount Lemmon	Mount Lemmon Survey	EOS	1.6 km	MPC · JPL
500660	2012 VS_{21}	—	December 30, 2007	Mount Lemmon	Mount Lemmon Survey	THM	2.1 km	MPC · JPL
500661	2012 VN_{23}	—	December 17, 2007	Kitt Peak	Spacewatch	THM	1.7 km	MPC · JPL
500662	2012 VJ_{27}	—	September 17, 2006	Kitt Peak	Spacewatch	·	2.5 km	MPC · JPL
500663	2012 VS_{27}	—	October 11, 2012	Haleakala	Pan-STARRS 1	HYG	2.6 km	MPC · JPL
500664	2012 VO_{28}	—	November 14, 2007	Kitt Peak	Spacewatch	·	1.4 km	MPC · JPL
500665	2012 VB_{29}	—	May 2, 2006	Mount Lemmon	Mount Lemmon Survey	H	420 m	MPC · JPL
500666	2012 VO_{29}	—	October 15, 2007	Kitt Peak	Spacewatch	·	1.6 km	MPC · JPL
500667	2012 VS_{31}	—	October 11, 2012	Haleakala	Pan-STARRS 1	·	3.0 km	MPC · JPL
500668	2012 VL_{39}	—	August 21, 2006	Kitt Peak	Spacewatch	·	1.9 km	MPC · JPL
500669	2012 VU_{39}	—	November 6, 2012	Kitt Peak	Spacewatch	EOS	2.0 km	MPC · JPL
500670	2012 VV_{39}	—	October 22, 2012	Haleakala	Pan-STARRS 1	·	3.2 km	MPC · JPL
500671	2012 VJ_{42}	—	January 1, 2008	Mount Lemmon	Mount Lemmon Survey	·	2.8 km	MPC · JPL
500672	2012 VM_{43}	—	June 11, 2010	Mount Lemmon	Mount Lemmon Survey	·	3.5 km	MPC · JPL
500673	2012 VF_{45}	—	February 20, 2009	Kitt Peak	Spacewatch	·	2.2 km	MPC · JPL
500674	2012 VY_{47}	—	December 4, 2007	Mount Lemmon	Mount Lemmon Survey	THM	2.0 km	MPC · JPL
500675	2012 VK_{59}	—	September 19, 2006	Kitt Peak	Spacewatch	HYG	2.1 km	MPC · JPL
500676	2012 VX_{60}	—	December 18, 2007	Kitt Peak	Spacewatch	·	1.5 km	MPC · JPL
500677	2012 VA_{62}	—	December 21, 2007	Mount Lemmon	Mount Lemmon Survey	·	2.7 km	MPC · JPL
500678	2012 VD_{63}	—	October 18, 2012	Haleakala	Pan-STARRS 1	·	2.5 km	MPC · JPL
500679	2012 VE_{63}	—	October 20, 2007	Mount Lemmon	Mount Lemmon Survey	·	1.7 km	MPC · JPL
500680	2012 VD_{73}	—	September 19, 2006	Kitt Peak	Spacewatch	·	2.6 km	MPC · JPL
500681	2012 VS_{73}	—	December 18, 2001	Socorro	LINEAR	·	2.8 km	MPC · JPL
500682	2012 VC_{74}	—	October 21, 2012	Haleakala	Pan-STARRS 1	·	2.7 km	MPC · JPL
500683	2012 VZ_{78}	—	October 21, 2012	Haleakala	Pan-STARRS 1	EOS	2.1 km	MPC · JPL
500684	2012 VH_{81}	—	March 27, 2009	Mount Lemmon	Mount Lemmon Survey	·	3.0 km	MPC · JPL
500685	2012 VA_{83}	—	November 15, 1995	Kitt Peak	Spacewatch	·	2.6 km	MPC · JPL
500686	2012 VO_{85}	—	November 20, 2001	Socorro	LINEAR	·	2.3 km	MPC · JPL
500687	2012 VO_{88}	—	September 17, 2006	Kitt Peak	Spacewatch	·	2.6 km	MPC · JPL
500688	2012 VF_{91}	—	September 28, 2006	Mount Lemmon	Mount Lemmon Survey	·	2.7 km	MPC · JPL
500689	2012 VB_{92}	—	August 26, 2011	Haleakala	Pan-STARRS 1	·	2.9 km	MPC · JPL
500690	2012 VS_{92}	—	November 2, 2007	Mount Lemmon	Mount Lemmon Survey	·	2.5 km	MPC · JPL
500691	2012 VP_{94}	—	October 21, 2001	Kitt Peak	Spacewatch	·	2.6 km	MPC · JPL
500692	2012 VF_{95}	—	October 16, 2012	Kitt Peak	Spacewatch	·	2.2 km	MPC · JPL
500693	2012 VG_{95}	—	September 20, 2011	Haleakala	Pan-STARRS 1	·	3.8 km	MPC · JPL
500694	2012 VP_{97}	—	April 21, 2006	Kitt Peak	Spacewatch	H	530 m	MPC · JPL
500695	2012 VD_{107}	—	August 28, 2006	Kitt Peak	Spacewatch	·	1.6 km	MPC · JPL
500696	2012 VF_{109}	—	November 11, 2007	Mount Lemmon	Mount Lemmon Survey	·	2.0 km	MPC · JPL
500697	2012 VH_{109}	—	August 21, 2006	Kitt Peak	Spacewatch	·	2.0 km	MPC · JPL
500698	2012 VQ_{109}	—	November 13, 2012	Mount Lemmon	Mount Lemmon Survey	T_{j} (2.99) · (895)	3.4 km	MPC · JPL
500699	2012 VN_{110}	—	November 1, 2006	Mount Lemmon	Mount Lemmon Survey	·	2.5 km	MPC · JPL
500700	2012 VP_{111}	—	December 31, 2007	Mount Lemmon	Mount Lemmon Survey	THM	2.0 km	MPC · JPL

== 500701–500800 ==
back to top

Designation			Discovery			Properties		Ref
Permanent	Provisional	Named after	Date	Site	Discoverer(s)	Category	Diam.	Ref
500701	2012 WO_{1}	—	November 17, 2012	Kitt Peak	Spacewatch	EOS	1.5 km	MPC · JPL
500702	2012 WK_{3}	—	August 27, 2006	Kitt Peak	Spacewatch	·	2.1 km	MPC · JPL
500703	2012 WL_{3}	—	October 23, 2012	Mount Lemmon	Mount Lemmon Survey	H	620 m	MPC · JPL
500704	2012 WC_{10}	—	October 9, 2012	Mount Lemmon	Mount Lemmon Survey	·	3.3 km	MPC · JPL
500705	2012 WA_{12}	—	October 26, 2012	Mount Lemmon	Mount Lemmon Survey	·	2.1 km	MPC · JPL
500706	2012 WE_{14}	—	December 28, 2007	Kitt Peak	Spacewatch	·	1.5 km	MPC · JPL
500707	2012 WF_{18}	—	October 22, 2012	Haleakala	Pan-STARRS 1	·	2.9 km	MPC · JPL
500708	2012 WB_{19}	—	October 23, 2012	Mount Lemmon	Mount Lemmon Survey	·	2.2 km	MPC · JPL
500709	2012 WS_{28}	—	October 20, 2006	Kitt Peak	Spacewatch	·	2.3 km	MPC · JPL
500710	2012 WX_{33}	—	February 26, 2008	Mount Lemmon	Mount Lemmon Survey	THM	1.8 km	MPC · JPL
500711	2012 XJ	—	December 3, 2012	Mount Lemmon	Mount Lemmon Survey	H	540 m	MPC · JPL
500712	2012 XM_{1}	—	October 21, 2012	Kitt Peak	Spacewatch	·	1.9 km	MPC · JPL
500713	2012 XZ_{7}	—	November 4, 2012	Kitt Peak	Spacewatch	EOS	2.1 km	MPC · JPL
500714	2012 XL_{10}	—	November 16, 1995	Kitt Peak	Spacewatch	·	3.2 km	MPC · JPL
500715	2012 XU_{16}	—	December 7, 2012	Haleakala	Pan-STARRS 1	H	430 m	MPC · JPL
500716	2012 XG_{18}	—	September 28, 2006	Mount Lemmon	Mount Lemmon Survey	THM	1.8 km	MPC · JPL
500717	2012 XJ_{20}	—	December 16, 2007	Mount Lemmon	Mount Lemmon Survey	VER	2.9 km	MPC · JPL
500718	2012 XY_{22}	—	October 27, 2012	Mount Lemmon	Mount Lemmon Survey	·	3.4 km	MPC · JPL
500719	2012 XX_{24}	—	August 26, 2011	Haleakala	Pan-STARRS 1	·	2.7 km	MPC · JPL
500720	2012 XL_{30}	—	October 4, 2006	Mount Lemmon	Mount Lemmon Survey	·	1.9 km	MPC · JPL
500721	2012 XA_{34}	—	September 28, 2006	Kitt Peak	Spacewatch	THM	2.2 km	MPC · JPL
500722	2012 XO_{34}	—	December 4, 2007	Kitt Peak	Spacewatch	·	2.0 km	MPC · JPL
500723	2012 XS_{34}	—	September 25, 2006	Mount Lemmon	Mount Lemmon Survey	THM	1.6 km	MPC · JPL
500724	2012 XS_{40}	—	November 14, 2006	Mount Lemmon	Mount Lemmon Survey	·	3.1 km	MPC · JPL
500725	2012 XP_{43}	—	November 6, 2012	Kitt Peak	Spacewatch	VER	2.7 km	MPC · JPL
500726	2012 XW_{47}	—	December 4, 2012	Kitt Peak	Spacewatch	H	630 m	MPC · JPL
500727	2012 XY_{50}	—	July 28, 2011	Haleakala	Pan-STARRS 1	·	2.0 km	MPC · JPL
500728	2012 XZ_{57}	—	October 2, 2006	Mount Lemmon	Mount Lemmon Survey	·	2.5 km	MPC · JPL
500729	2012 XZ_{69}	—	December 5, 2012	Mount Lemmon	Mount Lemmon Survey	·	2.0 km	MPC · JPL
500730	2012 XG_{72}	—	November 7, 2012	Haleakala	Pan-STARRS 1	EOS	1.8 km	MPC · JPL
500731	2012 XM_{85}	—	January 27, 1998	Kitt Peak	Spacewatch	·	1.7 km	MPC · JPL
500732	2012 XT_{85}	—	October 2, 2006	Mount Lemmon	Mount Lemmon Survey	EOS	2.0 km	MPC · JPL
500733	2012 XQ_{110}	—	November 11, 2006	Socorro	LINEAR	EUP	4.4 km	MPC · JPL
500734	2012 XB_{116}	—	September 23, 2012	Mount Lemmon	Mount Lemmon Survey	H	610 m	MPC · JPL
500735	2012 XA_{123}	—	September 14, 2006	Kitt Peak	Spacewatch	·	2.0 km	MPC · JPL
500736	2012 XS_{127}	—	August 29, 2006	Kitt Peak	Spacewatch	·	1.9 km	MPC · JPL
500737	2012 XY_{128}	—	November 5, 1996	Kitt Peak	Spacewatch	·	1.9 km	MPC · JPL
500738	2012 XK_{129}	—	December 14, 2001	Kitt Peak	Spacewatch	·	3.3 km	MPC · JPL
500739	2012 XM_{133}	—	November 22, 2006	Catalina	CSS	·	4.5 km	MPC · JPL
500740	2012 XJ_{140}	—	January 15, 2008	Mount Lemmon	Mount Lemmon Survey	·	2.5 km	MPC · JPL
500741	2012 XF_{142}	—	December 6, 2012	Mount Lemmon	Mount Lemmon Survey	·	2.1 km	MPC · JPL
500742	2012 XE_{144}	—	December 9, 2012	Haleakala	Pan-STARRS 1	EOS	2.4 km	MPC · JPL
500743	2012 YE_{7}	—	December 29, 2012	Haleakala	Pan-STARRS 1	H	470 m	MPC · JPL
500744	2013 AK_{17}	—	December 13, 2012	Catalina	CSS	·	970 m	MPC · JPL
500745	2013 AO_{19}	—	January 27, 2007	Kitt Peak	Spacewatch	·	3.0 km	MPC · JPL
500746	2013 AC_{21}	—	December 9, 2012	Mount Lemmon	Mount Lemmon Survey	H	470 m	MPC · JPL
500747	2013 AU_{47}	—	November 24, 2006	Kitt Peak	Spacewatch	·	2.8 km	MPC · JPL
500748	2013 AJ_{50}	—	January 5, 2013	Kitt Peak	Spacewatch	H	390 m	MPC · JPL
500749	2013 AP_{60}	—	January 9, 2013	Catalina	CSS	T_{j} (2.72) · APO +1km	1.6 km	MPC · JPL
500750	2013 AA_{65}	—	January 8, 2013	Haleakala	Pan-STARRS 1	H	440 m	MPC · JPL
500751	2013 AU_{68}	—	December 11, 2012	Kitt Peak	Spacewatch	·	2.8 km	MPC · JPL
500752	2013 AO_{71}	—	January 7, 2013	Catalina	CSS	H	490 m	MPC · JPL
500753	2013 AM_{74}	—	October 3, 2006	Catalina	CSS	TIR	2.8 km	MPC · JPL
500754	2013 AN_{75}	—	September 26, 2000	Socorro	LINEAR	TIR	3.1 km	MPC · JPL
500755	2013 AM_{92}	—	September 24, 2011	Haleakala	Pan-STARRS 1	·	3.7 km	MPC · JPL
500756	2013 AD_{100}	—	January 3, 2013	Haleakala	Pan-STARRS 1	H	560 m	MPC · JPL
500757	2013 AF_{100}	—	September 8, 2011	Haleakala	Pan-STARRS 1	EOS	1.8 km	MPC · JPL
500758	2013 AF_{119}	—	January 5, 2013	Mount Lemmon	Mount Lemmon Survey	H	610 m	MPC · JPL
500759	2013 AN_{141}	—	December 9, 2009	La Sagra	OAM	H	560 m	MPC · JPL
500760	2013 BX_{20}	—	October 28, 2006	Catalina	CSS	·	2.6 km	MPC · JPL
500761	2013 BU_{27}	—	January 7, 2010	Mount Lemmon	Mount Lemmon Survey	H	500 m	MPC · JPL
500762	2013 BK_{70}	—	September 27, 2012	Haleakala	Pan-STARRS 1	H	640 m	MPC · JPL
500763	2013 CF_{1}	—	March 10, 2008	Mount Lemmon	Mount Lemmon Survey	H	610 m	MPC · JPL
500764	2013 CJ_{1}	—	January 20, 2013	Kitt Peak	Spacewatch	H	440 m	MPC · JPL
500765	2013 CO_{1}	—	September 27, 2012	Haleakala	Pan-STARRS 1	H	550 m	MPC · JPL
500766	2013 CL_{13}	—	March 4, 2010	Kitt Peak	Spacewatch	·	620 m	MPC · JPL
500767	2013 CO_{15}	—	January 23, 2006	Kitt Peak	Spacewatch	·	640 m	MPC · JPL
500768	2013 CP_{42}	—	April 9, 2010	Mount Lemmon	Mount Lemmon Survey	·	480 m	MPC · JPL
500769	2013 CX_{45}	—	January 4, 2006	Kitt Peak	Spacewatch	·	790 m	MPC · JPL
500770	2013 CT_{64}	—	August 27, 2011	Haleakala	Pan-STARRS 1	THB	2.4 km	MPC · JPL
500771	2013 CT_{115}	—	February 12, 2013	Haleakala	Pan-STARRS 1	·	690 m	MPC · JPL
500772	2013 CQ_{145}	—	February 25, 2006	Kitt Peak	Spacewatch	·	810 m	MPC · JPL
500773	2013 CM_{155}	—	February 14, 2013	Haleakala	Pan-STARRS 1	3:2 · SHU	4.6 km	MPC · JPL
500774	2013 CK_{186}	—	August 31, 2011	Haleakala	Pan-STARRS 1	·	810 m	MPC · JPL
500775	2013 CP_{191}	—	October 28, 2006	Mount Lemmon	Mount Lemmon Survey	·	3.0 km	MPC · JPL
500776	2013 CV_{192}	—	January 25, 2006	Kitt Peak	Spacewatch	·	590 m	MPC · JPL
500777	2013 DM_{12}	—	September 2, 2007	Mount Lemmon	Mount Lemmon Survey	·	930 m	MPC · JPL
500778	2013 DR_{15}	—	February 24, 2010	WISE	WISE	·	1.4 km	MPC · JPL
500779	2013 EP_{10}	—	November 25, 2006	Siding Spring	SSS	T_{j} (2.93)	3.1 km	MPC · JPL
500780	2013 EN_{16}	—	February 5, 2013	Kitt Peak	Spacewatch	·	780 m	MPC · JPL
500781	2013 EA_{18}	—	May 6, 2006	Mount Lemmon	Mount Lemmon Survey	·	710 m	MPC · JPL
500782	2013 EN_{18}	—	May 3, 2006	Mount Lemmon	Mount Lemmon Survey	MAS	540 m	MPC · JPL
500783	2013 EA_{30}	—	March 6, 2013	Haleakala	Pan-STARRS 1	3:2	6.1 km	MPC · JPL
500784	2013 EG_{42}	—	June 11, 2015	Haleakala	Pan-STARRS 1	L4	6.4 km	MPC · JPL
500785	2013 EU_{78}	—	April 15, 2010	Mount Lemmon	Mount Lemmon Survey	·	500 m	MPC · JPL
500786	2013 ET_{87}	—	November 25, 2005	Mount Lemmon	Mount Lemmon Survey	CYB	3.6 km	MPC · JPL
500787	2013 EJ_{107}	—	October 11, 2007	Kitt Peak	Spacewatch	·	940 m	MPC · JPL
500788	2013 EP_{109}	—	February 4, 2006	Catalina	CSS	·	850 m	MPC · JPL
500789	2013 EC_{120}	—	October 25, 2011	Haleakala	Pan-STARRS 1	·	810 m	MPC · JPL
500790	2013 EG_{123}	—	October 25, 2008	Mount Lemmon	Mount Lemmon Survey	·	630 m	MPC · JPL
500791	2013 EQ_{123}	—	October 10, 2007	Kitt Peak	Spacewatch	·	590 m	MPC · JPL
500792	2013 ER_{126}	—	April 11, 2010	WISE	WISE	PHO	2.0 km	MPC · JPL
500793	2013 FC	—	March 2, 2013	Haleakala	Pan-STARRS 1	·	1.3 km	MPC · JPL
500794	2013 FC_{5}	—	March 17, 2013	Kitt Peak	Spacewatch	·	660 m	MPC · JPL
500795	2013 FN_{11}	—	March 17, 2013	Mount Lemmon	Mount Lemmon Survey	·	560 m	MPC · JPL
500796	2013 FR_{13}	—	March 14, 2013	Catalina	CSS	·	850 m	MPC · JPL
500797	2013 FO_{22}	—	May 17, 2010	Kitt Peak	Spacewatch	·	590 m	MPC · JPL
500798	2013 GM_{1}	—	April 19, 2006	Kitt Peak	Spacewatch	·	780 m	MPC · JPL
500799	2013 GQ_{3}	—	February 20, 2006	Kitt Peak	Spacewatch	·	520 m	MPC · JPL
500800	2013 GJ_{5}	—	May 2, 2003	Kitt Peak	Spacewatch	·	470 m	MPC · JPL

== 500801–500900 ==
back to top

Designation			Discovery			Properties		Ref
Permanent	Provisional	Named after	Date	Site	Discoverer(s)	Category	Diam.	Ref
500801	2013 GU_{7}	—	April 4, 2013	Haleakala	Pan-STARRS 1	H	510 m	MPC · JPL
500802	2013 GA_{18}	—	March 14, 2013	Kitt Peak	Spacewatch	·	590 m	MPC · JPL
500803	2013 GB_{18}	—	March 15, 2013	Kitt Peak	Spacewatch	PHO	940 m	MPC · JPL
500804	2013 GH_{21}	—	February 7, 2006	Kitt Peak	Spacewatch	·	510 m	MPC · JPL
500805	2013 GR_{24}	—	September 29, 2005	Kitt Peak	Spacewatch	·	3.3 km	MPC · JPL
500806	2013 GC_{27}	—	January 16, 2009	Kitt Peak	Spacewatch	·	840 m	MPC · JPL
500807	2013 GY_{34}	—	October 26, 2011	Haleakala	Pan-STARRS 1	·	610 m	MPC · JPL
500808	2013 GP_{37}	—	March 16, 2013	Kitt Peak	Spacewatch	·	580 m	MPC · JPL
500809	2013 GT_{39}	—	July 13, 2010	La Sagra	OAM	·	830 m	MPC · JPL
500810	2013 GA_{43}	—	April 7, 2006	Kitt Peak	Spacewatch	·	720 m	MPC · JPL
500811	2013 GM_{63}	—	March 13, 2013	Kitt Peak	Spacewatch	·	670 m	MPC · JPL
500812	2013 GD_{71}	—	October 24, 2011	Haleakala	Pan-STARRS 1	·	590 m	MPC · JPL
500813	2013 GR_{71}	—	June 19, 2010	Mount Lemmon	Mount Lemmon Survey	·	540 m	MPC · JPL
500814	2013 GL_{82}	—	April 9, 2013	Haleakala	Pan-STARRS 1	·	910 m	MPC · JPL
500815	2013 GU_{87}	—	September 10, 2007	Kitt Peak	Spacewatch	·	650 m	MPC · JPL
500816	2013 GF_{88}	—	June 21, 2010	Mount Lemmon	Mount Lemmon Survey	·	480 m	MPC · JPL
500817	2013 GX_{93}	—	March 5, 2013	Haleakala	Pan-STARRS 1	·	650 m	MPC · JPL
500818	2013 GZ_{97}	—	April 9, 2013	Haleakala	Pan-STARRS 1	NYS	920 m	MPC · JPL
500819	2013 GF_{99}	—	November 19, 2011	Mount Lemmon	Mount Lemmon Survey	·	620 m	MPC · JPL
500820	2013 GX_{101}	—	April 15, 2013	Haleakala	Pan-STARRS 1	·	930 m	MPC · JPL
500821	2013 GG_{110}	—	April 10, 2013	Haleakala	Pan-STARRS 1	·	1.4 km	MPC · JPL
500822	2013 GX_{113}	—	March 13, 2013	Haleakala	Pan-STARRS 1	·	660 m	MPC · JPL
500823	2013 GY_{115}	—	January 23, 2006	Kitt Peak	Spacewatch	·	470 m	MPC · JPL
500824	2013 GU_{126}	—	April 13, 2013	Kitt Peak	Spacewatch	·	890 m	MPC · JPL
500825	2013 GM_{127}	—	September 10, 2007	Kitt Peak	Spacewatch	·	630 m	MPC · JPL
500826	2013 GP_{130}	—	January 21, 2013	Haleakala	Pan-STARRS 1	·	920 m	MPC · JPL
500827	2013 GQ_{133}	—	July 17, 2010	Siding Spring	SSS	·	600 m	MPC · JPL
500828	2013 GR_{136}	—	April 4, 2013	Mauna Kea	OSSOS	res · 4:7	100 km	MPC · JPL
500829	2013 GT_{136}	—	April 4, 2013	Mauna Kea	OSSOS	cubewano (hot)	152 km	MPC · JPL
500830	2013 GU_{136}	—	April 23, 2014	Cerro Tololo	DECam	cubewano (hot) · critical	117 km	MPC · JPL
500831	2013 GV_{136}	—	April 9, 2013	Mauna Kea	OSSOS	cubewano (hot) · critical	105 km	MPC · JPL
500832	2013 GZ_{136}	—	April 4, 2013	Mauna Kea	OSSOS	SDO · critical	90 km	MPC · JPL
500833	2013 GD_{137}	—	April 4, 2013	Mauna Kea	OSSOS	plutino · critical	102 km	MPC · JPL
500834	2013 GK_{137}	—	April 9, 2013	Mauna Kea	OSSOS	plutino · critical	173 km	MPC · JPL
500835	2013 GN_{137}	—	April 4, 2013	Mauna Kea	OSSOS	cubewano (cold) · moon · critical	127 km	MPC · JPL
500836	2013 GQ_{137}	—	April 4, 2013	Mauna Kea	OSSOS	cubewano (cold) · critical	111 km	MPC · JPL
500837	2013 GT_{137}	—	April 9, 2013	Mauna Kea	OSSOS	cubewano (cold) · critical	107 km	MPC · JPL
500838	2013 GV_{137}	—	April 9, 2013	Mauna Kea	OSSOS	cubewano (cold) · critical	145 km	MPC · JPL
500839	2013 GW_{137}	—	April 9, 2013	Mauna Kea	OSSOS	cubewano (hot) · critical	131 km	MPC · JPL
500840	2013 GA_{138}	—	April 9, 2013	Mauna Kea	OSSOS	cubewano (cold) · critical	90 km	MPC · JPL
500841	2013 HE_{30}	—	September 4, 2010	Mount Lemmon	Mount Lemmon Survey	·	990 m	MPC · JPL
500842	2013 HE_{49}	—	April 9, 2013	Haleakala	Pan-STARRS 1	·	480 m	MPC · JPL
500843	2013 HQ_{52}	—	November 11, 2004	Kitt Peak	Spacewatch	·	560 m	MPC · JPL
500844	2013 HE_{53}	—	October 11, 2007	Kitt Peak	Spacewatch	·	500 m	MPC · JPL
500845	2013 HK_{61}	—	October 24, 2011	Haleakala	Pan-STARRS 1	·	520 m	MPC · JPL
500846	2013 HN_{61}	—	January 31, 2006	Kitt Peak	Spacewatch	·	520 m	MPC · JPL
500847	2013 HC_{62}	—	April 9, 2013	Haleakala	Pan-STARRS 1	·	720 m	MPC · JPL
500848	2013 HC_{64}	—	November 21, 2008	Mount Lemmon	Mount Lemmon Survey	·	470 m	MPC · JPL
500849	2013 HA_{73}	—	June 14, 2010	Mount Lemmon	Mount Lemmon Survey	·	700 m	MPC · JPL
500850	2013 HB_{81}	—	May 22, 2006	Kitt Peak	Spacewatch	·	650 m	MPC · JPL
500851	2013 HQ_{84}	—	October 10, 2007	Mount Lemmon	Mount Lemmon Survey	·	620 m	MPC · JPL
500852	2013 HJ_{89}	—	April 9, 2013	Haleakala	Pan-STARRS 1	·	560 m	MPC · JPL
500853	2013 HT_{120}	—	April 10, 2013	Haleakala	Pan-STARRS 1	·	660 m	MPC · JPL
500854	2013 HP_{128}	—	October 24, 2011	Haleakala	Pan-STARRS 1	·	730 m	MPC · JPL
500855	2013 HS_{140}	—	November 1, 2008	Mount Lemmon	Mount Lemmon Survey	·	510 m	MPC · JPL
500856	2013 HT_{156}	—	April 19, 2013	Mauna Kea	OSSOS	cubewano (cold)	100 km	MPC · JPL
500857	2013 JO_{2}	—	February 19, 2009	Kitt Peak	Spacewatch	·	820 m	MPC · JPL
500858	2013 JJ_{3}	—	April 9, 2013	Haleakala	Pan-STARRS 1	·	540 m	MPC · JPL
500859	2013 JG_{6}	—	March 3, 2009	Mount Lemmon	Mount Lemmon Survey	·	860 m	MPC · JPL
500860	2013 JZ_{10}	—	May 6, 2006	Kitt Peak	Spacewatch	(2076)	620 m	MPC · JPL
500861	2013 JE_{11}	—	March 17, 2013	Mount Lemmon	Mount Lemmon Survey	·	720 m	MPC · JPL
500862	2013 JY_{21}	—	April 15, 2013	Haleakala	Pan-STARRS 1	·	680 m	MPC · JPL
500863	2013 JZ_{23}	—	April 15, 2013	Haleakala	Pan-STARRS 1	·	820 m	MPC · JPL
500864	2013 JC_{25}	—	April 10, 2013	Kitt Peak	Spacewatch	·	1.4 km	MPC · JPL
500865	2013 JT_{26}	—	May 9, 2013	Siding Spring	SSS	·	1.0 km	MPC · JPL
500866	2013 JJ_{29}	—	October 2, 2010	Kitt Peak	Spacewatch	·	740 m	MPC · JPL
500867	2013 JO_{29}	—	April 15, 2013	Haleakala	Pan-STARRS 1	V	500 m	MPC · JPL
500868	2013 JN_{39}	—	March 23, 2006	Kitt Peak	Spacewatch	·	510 m	MPC · JPL
500869	2013 JW_{46}	—	January 27, 2012	Mount Lemmon	Mount Lemmon Survey	·	890 m	MPC · JPL
500870	2013 JQ_{48}	—	April 7, 2003	Kitt Peak	Spacewatch	·	530 m	MPC · JPL
500871	2013 JL_{52}	—	January 16, 2013	Haleakala	Pan-STARRS 1	·	2.4 km	MPC · JPL
500872	2013 JJ_{53}	—	September 14, 2010	La Sagra	OAM	·	930 m	MPC · JPL
500873	2013 JO_{58}	—	April 8, 2013	Mount Lemmon	Mount Lemmon Survey	·	550 m	MPC · JPL
500874	2013 JT_{58}	—	April 13, 2013	Haleakala	Pan-STARRS 1	·	610 m	MPC · JPL
500875	2013 JZ_{62}	—	January 16, 2009	Kitt Peak	Spacewatch	·	810 m	MPC · JPL
500876	2013 JD_{64}	—	May 8, 2013	Mauna Kea	OSSOS	SDO · critical	90 km	MPC · JPL
500877	2013 JE_{64}	—	May 7, 2013	Mauna Kea	OSSOS	twotino · critical	80 km	MPC · JPL
500878	2013 JG_{64}	—	May 7, 2013	Mauna Kea	OSSOS	cubewano (hot) · critical	133 km	MPC · JPL
500879	2013 JH_{64}	—	May 7, 2013	Mauna Kea	OSSOS	res · 4:11 · critical	254 km	MPC · JPL
500880	2013 JJ_{64}	—	May 7, 2013	Mauna Kea	OSSOS	twotino · critical	121 km	MPC · JPL
500881	2013 JM_{64}	—	May 8, 2013	Mauna Kea	OSSOS	cubewano (hot) · critical	107 km	MPC · JPL
500882	2013 JN_{64}	—	May 8, 2013	Mauna Kea	OSSOS	res · 3:7 · critical	80 km	MPC · JPL
500883	2013 JJ_{65}	—	May 8, 2013	Mauna Kea	OSSOS	plutino · critical	162 km	MPC · JPL
500884	2013 JK_{65}	—	May 8, 2013	Mauna Kea	OSSOS	plutino · critical	60 km	MPC · JPL
500885	2013 JL_{65}	—	May 8, 2013	Mauna Kea	OSSOS	plutino · critical	70 km	MPC · JPL
500886	2013 JN_{65}	—	May 7, 2013	Mauna Kea	OSSOS	cubewano (hot) · critical	150 km	MPC · JPL
500887	2013 JO_{65}	—	May 7, 2013	Mauna Kea	OSSOS	cubewano (hot) · critical	103 km	MPC · JPL
500888	2013 JP_{65}	—	May 7, 2013	Mauna Kea	OSSOS	cubewano (hot) · critical	114 km	MPC · JPL
500889	2013 KC_{9}	—	May 16, 2013	Haleakala	Pan-STARRS 1	·	1.2 km	MPC · JPL
500890	2013 LS_{4}	—	April 15, 2013	Haleakala	Pan-STARRS 1	·	880 m	MPC · JPL
500891	2013 LH_{5}	—	May 17, 2013	Mount Lemmon	Mount Lemmon Survey	·	1.0 km	MPC · JPL
500892	2013 LO_{6}	—	August 8, 2010	WISE	WISE	·	770 m	MPC · JPL
500893	2013 LJ_{9}	—	May 16, 2013	Haleakala	Pan-STARRS 1	V	480 m	MPC · JPL
500894	2013 LM_{9}	—	November 2, 2010	Mount Lemmon	Mount Lemmon Survey	·	810 m	MPC · JPL
500895	2013 LJ_{13}	—	May 16, 2013	Haleakala	Pan-STARRS 1	·	510 m	MPC · JPL
500896	2013 LG_{21}	—	April 15, 2013	Haleakala	Pan-STARRS 1	·	1.0 km	MPC · JPL
500897	2013 LV_{27}	—	March 3, 2009	Kitt Peak	Spacewatch	·	720 m	MPC · JPL
500898	2013 LD_{28}	—	December 14, 2006	Kitt Peak	Spacewatch	·	1.7 km	MPC · JPL
500899	2013 LS_{28}	—	April 15, 2013	Haleakala	Pan-STARRS 1	·	810 m	MPC · JPL
500900	2013 LX_{31}	—	August 21, 2006	Kitt Peak	Spacewatch	·	1.1 km	MPC · JPL

== 500901–501000 ==
back to top

Designation			Discovery			Properties		Ref
Permanent	Provisional	Named after	Date	Site	Discoverer(s)	Category	Diam.	Ref
500901	2013 MX_{3}	—	June 18, 2013	Mount Lemmon	Mount Lemmon Survey	·	1.1 km	MPC · JPL
500902	2013 MA_{5}	—	June 19, 2013	Mount Lemmon	Mount Lemmon Survey	·	1.1 km	MPC · JPL
500903	2013 MW_{9}	—	October 30, 2010	Mount Lemmon	Mount Lemmon Survey	NYS	780 m	MPC · JPL
500904	2013 ND	—	November 4, 2010	Mount Lemmon	Mount Lemmon Survey	MAR	1.3 km	MPC · JPL
500905	2013 NA_{1}	—	February 27, 2009	Kitt Peak	Spacewatch	·	1.1 km	MPC · JPL
500906	2013 NS_{5}	—	April 30, 2009	Kitt Peak	Spacewatch	MAS	590 m	MPC · JPL
500907	2013 NC_{6}	—	November 8, 2010	Mount Lemmon	Mount Lemmon Survey	·	700 m	MPC · JPL
500908	2013 NR_{18}	—	August 19, 2006	Kitt Peak	Spacewatch	V	590 m	MPC · JPL
500909	2013 NZ_{20}	—	July 1, 2013	Haleakala	Pan-STARRS 1	·	680 m	MPC · JPL
500910	2013 NJ_{22}	—	October 31, 2008	Mount Lemmon	Mount Lemmon Survey	·	3.0 km	MPC · JPL
500911	2013 OD_{5}	—	August 23, 2001	Anderson Mesa	LONEOS	·	1.2 km	MPC · JPL
500912	2013 OL_{5}	—	July 8, 2005	Kitt Peak	Spacewatch	·	970 m	MPC · JPL
500913	2013 OD_{10}	—	July 2, 2013	Haleakala	Pan-STARRS 1	V	570 m	MPC · JPL
500914	2013 PM_{3}	—	June 23, 2009	Mount Lemmon	Mount Lemmon Survey	·	1.6 km	MPC · JPL
500915	2013 PU_{9}	—	August 3, 2013	Haleakala	Pan-STARRS 1	·	1.1 km	MPC · JPL
500916	2013 PB_{10}	—	September 12, 2001	Socorro	LINEAR	·	800 m	MPC · JPL
500917	2013 PM_{11}	—	October 14, 2009	Mount Lemmon	Mount Lemmon Survey	·	1.4 km	MPC · JPL
500918	2013 PH_{13}	—	September 19, 2001	Socorro	LINEAR	·	750 m	MPC · JPL
500919	2013 PJ_{25}	—	June 20, 2013	Haleakala	Pan-STARRS 1	·	1.2 km	MPC · JPL
500920	2013 PW_{25}	—	August 26, 2009	Catalina	CSS	·	1.7 km	MPC · JPL
500921	2013 PY_{25}	—	December 25, 2005	Mount Lemmon	Mount Lemmon Survey	(1547)	1.8 km	MPC · JPL
500922	2013 PE_{26}	—	August 8, 2013	Haleakala	Pan-STARRS 1	APO +1km	980 m	MPC · JPL
500923	2013 PP_{30}	—	August 9, 2013	Haleakala	Pan-STARRS 1	·	1.1 km	MPC · JPL
500924	2013 PG_{34}	—	February 27, 2012	Haleakala	Pan-STARRS 1	·	1.4 km	MPC · JPL
500925	2013 PW_{36}	—	February 25, 2011	Mount Lemmon	Mount Lemmon Survey	·	1.2 km	MPC · JPL
500926	2013 PR_{38}	—	February 13, 2012	Haleakala	Pan-STARRS 1	·	1.4 km	MPC · JPL
500927	2013 PG_{39}	—	July 28, 2009	Kitt Peak	Spacewatch	·	1.0 km	MPC · JPL
500928	2013 PO_{39}	—	August 9, 2013	Kitt Peak	Spacewatch	·	900 m	MPC · JPL
500929	2013 PM_{45}	—	December 5, 2010	Mount Lemmon	Mount Lemmon Survey	·	1.0 km	MPC · JPL
500930	2013 PR_{47}	—	September 29, 2005	Kitt Peak	Spacewatch	(5)	880 m	MPC · JPL
500931	2013 PS_{50}	—	February 5, 2011	Mount Lemmon	Mount Lemmon Survey	·	810 m	MPC · JPL
500932	2013 PZ_{50}	—	April 24, 2012	Kitt Peak	Spacewatch	·	1.6 km	MPC · JPL
500933	2013 PA_{54}	—	September 29, 2005	Mount Lemmon	Mount Lemmon Survey	·	970 m	MPC · JPL
500934	2013 PF_{55}	—	August 9, 2013	Haleakala	Pan-STARRS 1	·	1.0 km	MPC · JPL
500935	2013 PX_{55}	—	August 12, 2013	Kitt Peak	Spacewatch	EUN	770 m	MPC · JPL
500936	2013 PU_{60}	—	July 15, 2013	Haleakala	Pan-STARRS 1	·	980 m	MPC · JPL
500937	2013 PX_{63}	—	July 15, 2013	Haleakala	Pan-STARRS 1	·	870 m	MPC · JPL
500938	2013 PE_{66}	—	August 15, 2009	La Sagra	OAM	·	1.1 km	MPC · JPL
500939	2013 PR_{69}	—	November 21, 2006	Mount Lemmon	Mount Lemmon Survey	·	1.3 km	MPC · JPL
500940	2013 PW_{72}	—	August 28, 2009	Kitt Peak	Spacewatch	·	810 m	MPC · JPL
500941	2013 PB_{74}	—	March 1, 2010	WISE	WISE	·	2.0 km	MPC · JPL
500942	2013 QK_{2}	—	September 20, 2001	Socorro	LINEAR	·	680 m	MPC · JPL
500943	2013 QZ_{4}	—	September 25, 2009	Catalina	CSS	EUN	1.1 km	MPC · JPL
500944	2013 QS_{5}	—	July 19, 2009	La Sagra	OAM	·	1.3 km	MPC · JPL
500945	2013 QC_{6}	—	December 31, 2005	Kitt Peak	Spacewatch	·	1.3 km	MPC · JPL
500946	2013 QU_{6}	—	June 20, 2013	Haleakala	Pan-STARRS 1	·	1.0 km	MPC · JPL
500947	2013 QP_{9}	—	October 28, 2005	Kitt Peak	Spacewatch	·	930 m	MPC · JPL
500948	2013 QN_{12}	—	February 8, 2011	Mount Lemmon	Mount Lemmon Survey	·	1.4 km	MPC · JPL
500949	2013 QU_{13}	—	March 6, 1994	Kitt Peak	Spacewatch	BAR	1.1 km	MPC · JPL
500950	2013 QT_{15}	—	August 28, 2013	Haleakala	Pan-STARRS 1	·	1.4 km	MPC · JPL
500951	2013 QS_{27}	—	January 19, 2012	Haleakala	Pan-STARRS 1	NYS	1.2 km	MPC · JPL
500952	2013 QU_{28}	—	August 8, 2013	Kitt Peak	Spacewatch	·	1.3 km	MPC · JPL
500953	2013 QX_{28}	—	October 24, 2005	Kitt Peak	Spacewatch	·	1 km	MPC · JPL
500954	2013 QZ_{31}	—	February 5, 2011	Mount Lemmon	Mount Lemmon Survey	·	1.1 km	MPC · JPL
500955	2013 QQ_{32}	—	August 26, 2013	Haleakala	Pan-STARRS 1	PHO	1.1 km	MPC · JPL
500956	2013 QR_{33}	—	August 12, 2013	Haleakala	Pan-STARRS 1	·	1.0 km	MPC · JPL
500957	2013 QX_{35}	—	February 10, 2011	Mount Lemmon	Mount Lemmon Survey	·	1.0 km	MPC · JPL
500958	2013 QG_{37}	—	August 18, 2009	Kitt Peak	Spacewatch	·	860 m	MPC · JPL
500959	2013 QD_{42}	—	September 28, 2000	Kitt Peak	Spacewatch	·	1.3 km	MPC · JPL
500960	2013 QY_{42}	—	December 22, 2005	Catalina	CSS	·	2.0 km	MPC · JPL
500961	2013 QP_{44}	—	February 24, 2012	Haleakala	Pan-STARRS 1	·	1.0 km	MPC · JPL
500962	2013 QT_{50}	—	July 27, 2009	Kitt Peak	Spacewatch	MAS	620 m	MPC · JPL
500963	2013 QF_{51}	—	August 30, 2005	Kitt Peak	Spacewatch	·	670 m	MPC · JPL
500964	2013 QX_{56}	—	November 8, 2009	Catalina	CSS	·	1.7 km	MPC · JPL
500965	2013 QE_{57}	—	September 19, 2009	Kitt Peak	Spacewatch	·	990 m	MPC · JPL
500966	2013 QD_{61}	—	May 4, 2005	Catalina	CSS	·	1.2 km	MPC · JPL
500967	2013 QS_{64}	—	June 21, 2013	Mount Lemmon	Mount Lemmon Survey	·	1.2 km	MPC · JPL
500968	2013 QF_{67}	—	October 30, 2005	Kitt Peak	Spacewatch	·	860 m	MPC · JPL
500969	2013 QK_{68}	—	August 8, 2013	Kitt Peak	Spacewatch	·	1.0 km	MPC · JPL
500970	2013 QH_{69}	—	July 8, 2013	Siding Spring	SSS	·	1.1 km	MPC · JPL
500971	2013 QO_{70}	—	March 26, 2007	Mount Lemmon	Mount Lemmon Survey	·	1.2 km	MPC · JPL
500972	2013 QO_{72}	—	February 10, 2011	Mount Lemmon	Mount Lemmon Survey	·	1.1 km	MPC · JPL
500973	2013 QE_{74}	—	May 10, 2005	Kitt Peak	Spacewatch	·	1.2 km	MPC · JPL
500974	2013 QH_{76}	—	October 14, 2009	Catalina	CSS	·	1.2 km	MPC · JPL
500975	2013 QJ_{77}	—	October 6, 2005	Mount Lemmon	Mount Lemmon Survey	·	1.3 km	MPC · JPL
500976	2013 QD_{80}	—	August 12, 2013	Kitt Peak	Spacewatch	·	740 m	MPC · JPL
500977	2013 QH_{82}	—	August 12, 2013	Haleakala	Pan-STARRS 1	ADE	1.7 km	MPC · JPL
500978	2013 QC_{83}	—	September 18, 2009	Catalina	CSS	·	1.5 km	MPC · JPL
500979	2013 QM_{83}	—	October 26, 2005	Kitt Peak	Spacewatch	·	940 m	MPC · JPL
500980	2013 QC_{84}	—	March 16, 2012	Haleakala	Pan-STARRS 1	·	1.5 km	MPC · JPL
500981	2013 QN_{90}	—	April 27, 2012	Haleakala	Pan-STARRS 1	·	1 km	MPC · JPL
500982	2013 QL_{91}	—	July 15, 2013	Haleakala	Pan-STARRS 1	·	1.1 km	MPC · JPL
500983	2013 QB_{95}	—	August 9, 2013	Catalina	CSS	·	870 m	MPC · JPL
500984	2013 RX_{1}	—	April 5, 2011	Mount Lemmon	Mount Lemmon Survey	·	1.9 km	MPC · JPL
500985	2013 RB_{3}	—	October 18, 2009	Mount Lemmon	Mount Lemmon Survey	(11882)	1.2 km	MPC · JPL
500986	2013 RK_{5}	—	September 19, 2009	Kitt Peak	Spacewatch	(5)	750 m	MPC · JPL
500987	2013 RH_{8}	—	August 15, 2013	Haleakala	Pan-STARRS 1	(7744)	1.1 km	MPC · JPL
500988	2013 RR_{10}	—	September 17, 2009	Kitt Peak	Spacewatch	·	1.1 km	MPC · JPL
500989	2013 RM_{11}	—	September 28, 2009	Kitt Peak	Spacewatch	(5)	640 m	MPC · JPL
500990	2013 RC_{12}	—	March 30, 2008	Kitt Peak	Spacewatch	·	1.1 km	MPC · JPL
500991	2013 RP_{12}	—	August 15, 2013	Haleakala	Pan-STARRS 1	·	840 m	MPC · JPL
500992	2013 RB_{16}	—	September 21, 2009	Kitt Peak	Spacewatch	·	1.1 km	MPC · JPL
500993	2013 RA_{18}	—	August 28, 2013	Catalina	CSS	·	950 m	MPC · JPL
500994	2013 RA_{20}	—	August 14, 2013	Haleakala	Pan-STARRS 1	·	1.2 km	MPC · JPL
500995	2013 RE_{20}	—	September 1, 2013	Mount Lemmon	Mount Lemmon Survey	WIT	920 m	MPC · JPL
500996	2013 RC_{22}	—	November 9, 2009	Socorro	LINEAR	·	2.0 km	MPC · JPL
500997	2013 RO_{22}	—	March 2, 2011	Mount Lemmon	Mount Lemmon Survey	·	1.4 km	MPC · JPL
500998	2013 RP_{23}	—	April 27, 2012	Haleakala	Pan-STARRS 1	·	1.1 km	MPC · JPL
500999	2013 RD_{25}	—	April 4, 2011	Mount Lemmon	Mount Lemmon Survey	EUN	1.2 km	MPC · JPL
501000	2013 RS_{25}	—	February 5, 2010	WISE	WISE	·	2.4 km	MPC · JPL

back to top

== Meaning of names ==
As minor planet discoveries are confirmed, they are given a permanent number by the IAU's Minor Planet Center (MPC), and the discoverers can then submit names for them, following the IAU's naming conventions. The list below concerns those minor planets in the specified number-range that have received names, and explains the meanings of those names.

Official naming citations of newly named small Solar System bodies are approved and published in a bulletin by IAU's Working Group for Small Bodies Nomenclature (WGSBN). Before May 2021, citations were published in MPC's Minor Planet Circulars for many decades. Recent citations can also be found on the JPL Small-Body Database (SBDB). Until his death in 2016, German astronomer Lutz D. Schmadel compiled these citations into the Dictionary of Minor Planet Names (DMP) and regularly updated the collection.

Based on Paul Herget's The Names of the Minor Planets, Schmadel also researched the unclear origin of numerous asteroids, most of which had been named prior to World War II. This article incorporates text from this source, which is in the public domain: SBDB New namings may only be added to this list below after official publication as the preannouncement of names is condemned. The WGSBN publishes a comprehensive guideline for the naming rules of non-cometary small Solar System bodies.

Named minor planet	Provisional	This minor planet was named for...	Ref · Catalog
500170 Lusitano	2012 FF_{25}	Lusitano, a modern synonym for Portuguese	IAU · 500170
