= Outer Solar System Origins Survey =

Astronomical survey

Minor planets discovered: 39
see § List of numbered minor planets discovered by OSSOS

The Outer Solar System Origins Survey (OSSOS) is an astronomical survey and observing program aimed at discovering and tracking trans-Neptunian objects located in the outermost regions of the Solar System beyond the orbit of Neptune. OSSOS is designed in way that observational biases can be characterized, allowing the numbers and orbits of detected objects to be compared using a survey simulator to the populations predicted in dynamical simulations of the emplacement of trans-Neptunian objects. Conducted at the Canada-France-Hawaii telescope at Mauna Kea Observatories (568) in Hawaii, the survey has discovered 39 numbered objects as of 2018, with potentially hundreds more to follow. The survey's first numbered discovery was the object (496315) 2013 GP136 in 2013.

== Description ==
OSSOS observed eight blocks of the sky over a period of five years from 2013–2017 using the MegaPrime camera of the 3.6-meter Canada-France-Hawaii Telescope. Images of these blocks were taken near opposition (when the block is near opposite the sun), two months before, and two months after. This extended period of observation was designed to remove ephemeris bias which can cause the loss of some objects due to inaccurate predictions of their future positions. Pointing directions, detection efficiencies, and tracking frequencies were determined to allow other observational biases to be identified.

These identified biases are used by the survey simulator developed by the OSSOS group. This survey simulator can estimate the populations of detected objects, for example those in resonances, and set upper limits for the classes of objects not detected. The survey simulator can also predict the number of object that would be detected by OSSOS given the output of dynamical models of the early Solar System, allowing the models to be statistically tested.

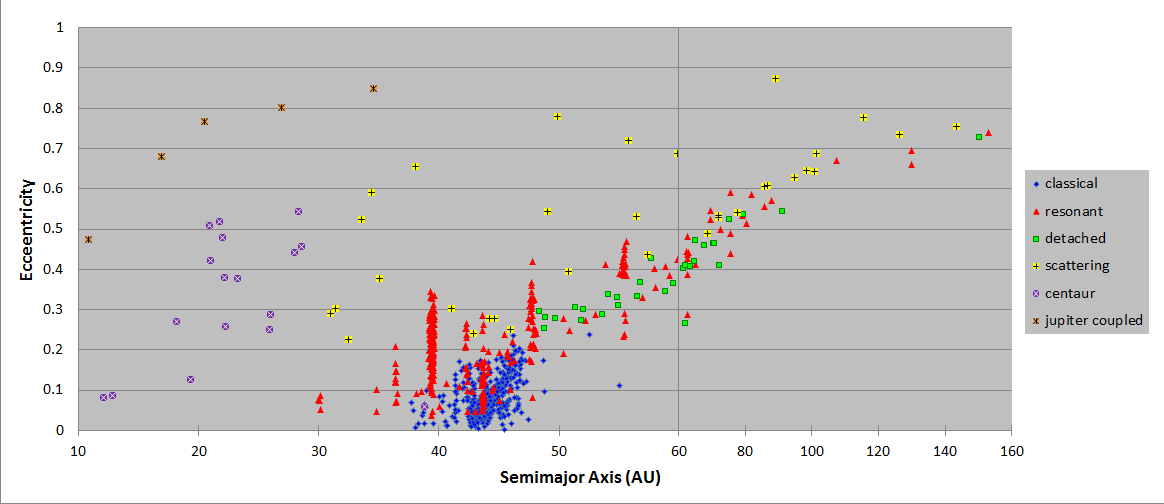
Semimajor axis and eccentricity of objects detected by OSSOS. Six other objects (not shown) with semimajor axes between 160 AU and 800 AU were also detected.

OSSOS has detected 838 objects, bring the total objects detected by well characterized surveys to more than 1100. Among these objects are a possible dwarf planet in a 9:2 resonance with Neptune, and two objects in a 9:1 resonance with Neptune. Other resonant objects have been detected and their populations estimated. A previously identified 'kernel' in the cold classical Kuiper belt has been confirmed and other cold classical objects beyond the 2:1 resonance with Neptune have been identified. OSSOS detected 3 potential members of the Haumea family, but none of these were faint, indicating that the family has a shallow size distribution. Analysis of the size distribution of the scattering population revealed a break in its slope. The inclination distribution of these scattering objects had more with inclinations greater than 45 degrees than predicted using simulations that included only the known planets and the influence of the galaxy, but also fewer with inclinations between 15 and 30 degrees than predicted when Planet Nine was added to the simulations. Extreme trans-Neptunian objects (eTNOs) have been found including one with a semi-major axis of 730 AU, 2013 SY_{99}, and seven other objects with semi-major axes greater than 150 AU and perihelia greater than 30 AU. After accounting for OSSOS's known biases the orbital elements of these objects are consist with a uniformly distributed population. Four scattered disk objects with high perihelia have been detected with semi-major axes smaller than nearby resonances, consistent with their escape during a slow grainy migration of Neptune. Closer to the Sun, 20 centaurs were found, none of which were active. The number of centaurs detected and their inclinantion distribution were consistent with a model of the early Solar System that included a slow, long range migration of Neptune. 65 of the smaller objects discovered by OSSOS were later observed using the Subaru telescope to determine the variability of their brightness.

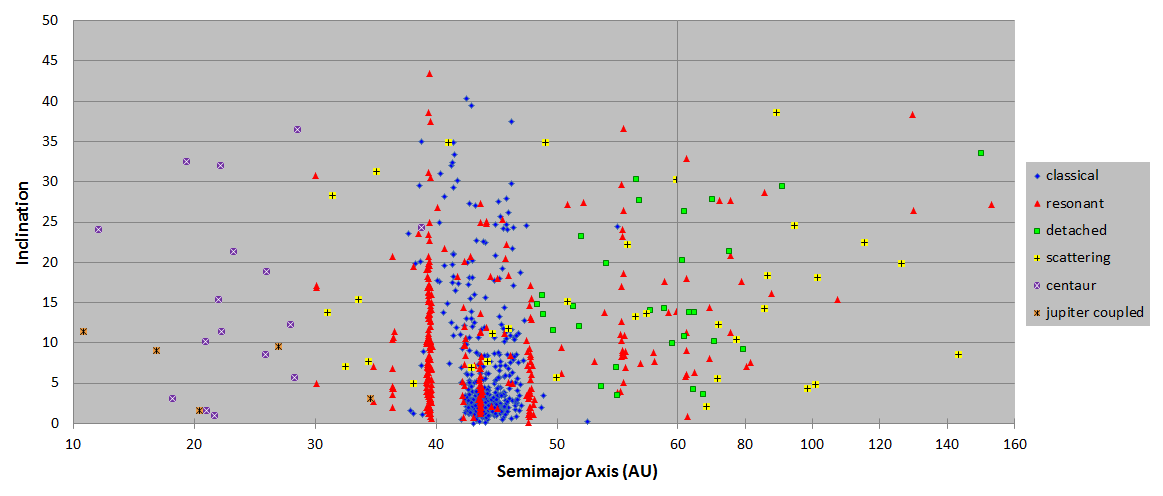
Semimajor axis and inclination of objects detected by OSSOS. Seven other objects (not shown) with semimajor axes between 160 AU and 800 AU or inclinations above 50 degrees were also detected.

Operating in conjunction with OSSOS is the Colours of the Outer Solar System Origins Survey (Col-OSSOS). Col-OSSOS observes OSSOS objects with red magnitudes brighter than 23.5 simultaneously using the Gemini-North and Canada-France-Hawaii telescopes. The simultaneous observation allows the colors of these object to be measured more accurately by removing variations in their brightness due to the rotation of the objects and changes in atmospheric conditions. These observations have revealed three surface types among the TNOs, and have identified numerous binaries including loosely bound neutrally colored 'blue binaries' that could have been pushed out into their current orbits during Neptune's migration. Among the dynamically excited populations the ratio of neutral to red objects has been estimated to be between 4:1 and 11:1. The inclination distributions were found to vary with color, with the red objects having lower inclinations. The Col-OSSOS team has also measured the color and light curve of ʻOumuamua.

== Team ==
=== Core members ===
The core members of the Outer Solar System Origin Survey are:

- Brett J. Gladman – co-principal investigator, orbit analysis
- John J. Kavelaars – co-principal investigator, data, discovery
- Jean-Marc Petit – co-principal investigator, orbit analysis, survey simulator
- Michele Bannister – data, discovery, telescope operations, (see cite)
- Stephen Gwyn – astrometric catalogue, (see cite)
- Kat Volk – orbit classification
- Ying-Tung (Charles) Chen – data analysis
- Mike Alexandersen – survey cadence & design

=== Collaborators ===
Collaborators of the Outer Solar System Origin Survey are:

- Andrew C. Becker
- Susan D. Benecchi (née Kern)
- Federica Bianco
- Steven Bickerton
- Ramon Brasser
- Audrey C. Delsanti
- Wesley Fraser
- Mikael Granvik
- Will Grundy
- Aurelie Guilbert-Lepoutre
- Amanda Sickafoose Gulbis
- Daniel Hestroffer
- Wing Ip
- Marian Jakubik
- Lynne Jones
- Nathan Kaib
- Pavlo Korsun
- Simon Krughoff
- Irina Kulyk
- Pedro Lacerda
- Sam Lawler
- Matthew Lehner
- Edward Lin
- Tim Lister
- Patryk Lykawka
- Ruth Murray-Clay
- Keith Noll
- Alex Parker
- Nuno Peixinho
- Rosemary Pike
- Philippe Rousselot
- Megan Schwamb
- Cory Shankman
- Bruno Sicardy
- Scott Tremaine
- Pierre Vernazza (see cite)
- Shiang-Yu Wang

== List of numbered minor planets discovered by OSSOS ==
Name	Date	List
(496315) 2013 GP136	2013/02/08	list
(500828) 2013 GR_{136}	2013/04/04	list
(500829) 2013 GT_{136}	2013/04/04	list
(500830) 2013 GU_{136}	2013/04/04	list
(500831) 2013 GV_{136}	2013/04/09	list
(500832) 2013 GZ_{136}	2013/04/04	list
(500833) 2013 GD_{137}	2013/04/04	list
(500834) 2013 GK_{137}	2013/04/09	list
(500835) 2013 GN_{137}	2013/04/04	list
(500836) 2013 GQ_{137}	2013/04/04	list
(500837) 2013 GT_{137}	2013/04/09	list
(500838) 2013 GV_{137}	2013/04/09	list
(500839) 2013 GW_{137}	2013/04/09	list
(500840) 2013 GA_{138}	2013/04/09	list
(500856) 2013 HT_{156}	2013/04/09	list
(500876) 2013 JD_{64}	2013/05/08	list
(500877) 2013 JE_{64}	2013/05/07	list
(500878) 2013 JG_{64}	2013/05/07	list
(500879) 2013 JH_{64}	2013/05/07	list
(500880) 2013 JJ_{64}	2013/05/07	list
(500881) 2013 JM_{64}	2013/05/08	list
(500882) 2013 JN_{64}	2013/05/08	list
(500883) 2013 JJ_{65}	2013/05/08	list
(500884) 2013 JK_{65}	2013/05/08	list
(500885) 2013 JL_{65}	2013/05/08	list
(500886) 2013 JN_{65}	2013/05/07	list
(500887) 2013 JO_{65}	2013/05/07	list
(500888) 2013 JP_{65}	2013/05/07	list
(505446) 2013 SP_{99}	2013/08/05	list
(505447) 2013 SQ_{99}	2013/08/05	list
(505448) 2013 SA_{100}	2013/08/05	list
(505476) 2013 UL_{15}	2013/08/02	list
(505477) 2013 UM_{15}	2013/08/02	list
(505478) 2013 UT15	2013/08/02	list
(511551) 2014 UD_{225}	2013/08/08	list
(511552) 2014 UE_{225}	2013/08/08	list
(511553) 2014 UK_{225}	2013/11/29	list
(511554) 2014 UL_{225}	2013/09/01	list
(511555) 2014 UM_{225}	2013/08/08	list

== See also ==
- List of minor planet discoverers § OSSOS
- List of trans-Neptunian objects
