= List of minor planets: 511001–512000 =

The following is a partial list of minor planets, running from minor-planet number 511001 through 512000, inclusive. The primary data for this and other partial lists is based on JPL's "Small-Body Orbital Elements" and data available from the Minor Planet Center. Critical list information is also provided by the MPC, unless otherwise specified from Lowell Observatory. A detailed description of the table's columns and additional sources are given on the main page including a complete list of every page in this series, and a statistical break-up on the dynamical classification of minor planets.

Also see the summary list of all named bodies in numerical and alphabetical order, and the corresponding naming citations for the number range of this particular list. New namings may only be added to this list after official publication, as the preannouncement of names is condemned by the Working Group for Small Bodies Nomenclature of the International Astronomical Union.

Near-Earth obj.	MBA (inner)	MBA (outer)	Centaur
Mars-crosser	MBA (middle)	Jupiter trojan	Trans-Neptunian obj.
Unclassified

== 511001–511100 ==
Designation			Discovery			Properties		Ref
Permanent	Provisional	Named after	Date	Site	Discoverer(s)	Category	Diam.	Ref
511001	2013 MW_{5}	—	November 26, 2011	Mount Lemmon	Mount Lemmon Survey	H	550 m	MPC · JPL
511002	2013 MZ_{5}	—	June 18, 2013	Haleakala	Pan-STARRS 1	AMO	340 m	MPC · JPL
511003	2013 NG_{18}	—	September 2, 2010	Mount Lemmon	Mount Lemmon Survey	·	720 m	MPC · JPL
511004	2013 NN_{21}	—	December 3, 2010	Mount Lemmon	Mount Lemmon Survey	·	780 m	MPC · JPL
511005	2013 OD_{6}	—	July 28, 2013	Kitt Peak	Spacewatch	·	560 m	MPC · JPL
511006	2013 OZ_{7}	—	November 19, 2003	Kitt Peak	Spacewatch	·	600 m	MPC · JPL
511007	2013 PD_{4}	—	March 23, 2006	Kitt Peak	Spacewatch	·	560 m	MPC · JPL
511008	2013 PX_{6}	—	January 12, 2010	WISE	WISE	APO +1km · PHA	1.6 km	MPC · JPL
511009	2013 PM_{14}	—	January 31, 2008	Mount Lemmon	Mount Lemmon Survey	·	710 m	MPC · JPL
511010	2013 PV_{23}	—	August 28, 2006	Kitt Peak	Spacewatch	·	640 m	MPC · JPL
511011	2013 PU_{26}	—	March 2, 2009	Kitt Peak	Spacewatch	·	540 m	MPC · JPL
511012	2013 PT_{37}	—	May 12, 1996	Kitt Peak	Spacewatch	·	730 m	MPC · JPL
511013	2013 PA_{56}	—	February 27, 2012	Haleakala	Pan-STARRS 1	·	630 m	MPC · JPL
511014	2013 PD_{71}	—	July 21, 2006	Mount Lemmon	Mount Lemmon Survey	·	620 m	MPC · JPL
511015	2013 PD_{73}	—	October 2, 2006	Mount Lemmon	Mount Lemmon Survey	NYS	750 m	MPC · JPL
511016	2013 QJ_{1}	—	December 22, 2003	Kitt Peak	Spacewatch	·	1.5 km	MPC · JPL
511017	2013 QU_{2}	—	September 18, 2006	Socorro	LINEAR	·	720 m	MPC · JPL
511018	2013 QK_{3}	—	September 21, 2003	Kitt Peak	Spacewatch	·	490 m	MPC · JPL
511019	2013 QJ_{6}	—	June 18, 2013	Catalina	CSS	·	1.0 km	MPC · JPL
511020	2013 QN_{20}	—	October 5, 2003	Kitt Peak	Spacewatch	·	850 m	MPC · JPL
511021	2013 QQ_{25}	—	March 28, 2008	Mount Lemmon	Mount Lemmon Survey	·	760 m	MPC · JPL
511022	2013 QB_{26}	—	August 13, 1993	Kitt Peak	Spacewatch	·	650 m	MPC · JPL
511023	2013 QB_{41}	—	February 10, 2008	Kitt Peak	Spacewatch	(2076)	720 m	MPC · JPL
511024	2013 QW_{41}	—	August 12, 2013	Haleakala	Pan-STARRS 1	·	770 m	MPC · JPL
511025	2013 QO_{47}	—	November 21, 2003	Socorro	LINEAR	·	740 m	MPC · JPL
511026	2013 QZ_{56}	—	April 18, 2009	Mount Lemmon	Mount Lemmon Survey	·	630 m	MPC · JPL
511027	2013 QH_{61}	—	December 30, 2007	Mount Lemmon	Mount Lemmon Survey	·	660 m	MPC · JPL
511028	2013 QD_{66}	—	December 10, 2010	Mount Lemmon	Mount Lemmon Survey	·	520 m	MPC · JPL
511029	2013 QL_{72}	—	December 30, 2007	Mount Lemmon	Mount Lemmon Survey	·	530 m	MPC · JPL
511030	2013 QF_{81}	—	March 23, 2012	Mount Lemmon	Mount Lemmon Survey	PHO	780 m	MPC · JPL
511031	2013 QH_{89}	—	October 16, 2003	Kitt Peak	Spacewatch	·	510 m	MPC · JPL
511032	2013 RH_{3}	—	November 21, 2003	Kitt Peak	Spacewatch	·	660 m	MPC · JPL
511033	2013 RF_{16}	—	January 10, 2008	Mount Lemmon	Mount Lemmon Survey	·	650 m	MPC · JPL
511034	2013 RE_{19}	—	August 29, 2006	Kitt Peak	Spacewatch	(2076)	630 m	MPC · JPL
511035	2013 RJ_{19}	—	December 2, 2010	Mount Lemmon	Mount Lemmon Survey	·	760 m	MPC · JPL
511036	2013 RL_{20}	—	February 13, 2011	Mount Lemmon	Mount Lemmon Survey	·	1.5 km	MPC · JPL
511037	2013 RY_{20}	—	November 21, 2003	Anderson Mesa	LONEOS	·	750 m	MPC · JPL
511038	2013 RA_{26}	—	December 5, 2010	Kitt Peak	Spacewatch	·	660 m	MPC · JPL
511039	2013 RU_{39}	—	March 7, 2008	Mount Lemmon	Mount Lemmon Survey	(1338) (FLO)	430 m	MPC · JPL
511040	2013 RB_{42}	—	January 29, 2011	Kitt Peak	Spacewatch	·	870 m	MPC · JPL
511041	2013 RX_{47}	—	September 14, 1999	Kitt Peak	Spacewatch	·	580 m	MPC · JPL
511042	2013 RM_{54}	—	September 16, 2010	Mount Lemmon	Mount Lemmon Survey	·	640 m	MPC · JPL
511043	2013 RR_{57}	—	February 27, 2012	Haleakala	Pan-STARRS 1	·	660 m	MPC · JPL
511044	2013 RA_{58}	—	September 20, 2006	Kitt Peak	Spacewatch	·	780 m	MPC · JPL
511045	2013 RG_{64}	—	August 15, 2013	Haleakala	Pan-STARRS 1	L5	6.7 km	MPC · JPL
511046	2013 RT_{69}	—	November 22, 2006	Kitt Peak	Spacewatch	·	890 m	MPC · JPL
511047	2013 RY_{74}	—	September 16, 2006	Kitt Peak	Spacewatch	(2076)	650 m	MPC · JPL
511048	2013 RX_{87}	—	October 4, 2006	Mount Lemmon	Mount Lemmon Survey	·	910 m	MPC · JPL
511049	2013 RZ_{94}	—	October 3, 2006	Mount Lemmon	Mount Lemmon Survey	·	850 m	MPC · JPL
511050	2013 RK_{95}	—	September 15, 2013	Catalina	CSS	·	1.0 km	MPC · JPL
511051	2013 RU_{95}	—	August 19, 2006	Kitt Peak	Spacewatch	·	650 m	MPC · JPL
511052	2013 RC_{96}	—	August 18, 2009	Kitt Peak	Spacewatch	NYS	1.1 km	MPC · JPL
511053	2013 SK_{10}	—	February 7, 2008	Mount Lemmon	Mount Lemmon Survey	·	610 m	MPC · JPL
511054	2013 SE_{14}	—	November 15, 2010	Mount Lemmon	Mount Lemmon Survey	·	560 m	MPC · JPL
511055	2013 SP_{29}	—	December 24, 2006	Kitt Peak	Spacewatch	·	1.1 km	MPC · JPL
511056	2013 SU_{45}	—	March 20, 1996	Kitt Peak	Spacewatch	L5	8.4 km	MPC · JPL
511057	2013 SO_{54}	—	February 9, 2008	Kitt Peak	Spacewatch	·	600 m	MPC · JPL
511058	2013 SR_{59}	—	September 5, 2013	Kitt Peak	Spacewatch	MAS	620 m	MPC · JPL
511059	2013 SB_{62}	—	January 14, 2008	Kitt Peak	Spacewatch	·	590 m	MPC · JPL
511060	2013 SK_{64}	—	September 15, 2006	Kitt Peak	Spacewatch	·	1.0 km	MPC · JPL
511061	2013 SM_{84}	—	September 27, 2006	Mount Lemmon	Mount Lemmon Survey	·	980 m	MPC · JPL
511062	2013 SD_{85}	—	November 17, 2006	Mount Lemmon	Mount Lemmon Survey	·	1.1 km	MPC · JPL
511063	2013 SY_{86}	—	December 8, 2010	Mount Lemmon	Mount Lemmon Survey	·	770 m	MPC · JPL
511064	2013 TH_{5}	—	October 2, 2013	Catalina	CSS	AMO +1km	1.1 km	MPC · JPL
511065	2013 TP_{6}	—	August 15, 2013	Haleakala	Pan-STARRS 1	PHO	930 m	MPC · JPL
511066	2013 TC_{7}	—	January 12, 2011	Mount Lemmon	Mount Lemmon Survey	MAS	660 m	MPC · JPL
511067	2013 TS_{10}	—	October 1, 2006	Catalina	CSS	·	860 m	MPC · JPL
511068	2013 TX_{19}	—	February 5, 2011	Haleakala	Pan-STARRS 1	NYS	930 m	MPC · JPL
511069	2013 TC_{25}	—	November 2, 2006	Mount Lemmon	Mount Lemmon Survey	PHO	1.1 km	MPC · JPL
511070	2013 TW_{27}	—	February 13, 2011	Mount Lemmon	Mount Lemmon Survey	NYS	1.0 km	MPC · JPL
511071	2013 TB_{30}	—	September 12, 2013	Mount Lemmon	Mount Lemmon Survey	(5)	1.0 km	MPC · JPL
511072	2013 TZ_{32}	—	February 8, 2011	Mount Lemmon	Mount Lemmon Survey	·	940 m	MPC · JPL
511073	2013 TA_{33}	—	August 19, 2009	La Sagra	OAM	MAS	800 m	MPC · JPL
511074	2013 TT_{34}	—	October 18, 2006	Kitt Peak	Spacewatch	·	670 m	MPC · JPL
511075	2013 TD_{48}	—	October 19, 2006	Catalina	CSS	·	860 m	MPC · JPL
511076	2013 TO_{53}	—	October 16, 2010	La Sagra	OAM	·	1.6 km	MPC · JPL
511077	2013 TJ_{56}	—	October 18, 2003	Kitt Peak	Spacewatch	·	550 m	MPC · JPL
511078	2013 TG_{64}	—	September 18, 2003	Kitt Peak	Spacewatch	·	570 m	MPC · JPL
511079	2013 TT_{70}	—	September 30, 2006	Mount Lemmon	Mount Lemmon Survey	·	710 m	MPC · JPL
511080	2013 TE_{80}	—	December 27, 2006	Mount Lemmon	Mount Lemmon Survey	MAS	580 m	MPC · JPL
511081	2013 TC_{81}	—	September 6, 2013	Kitt Peak	Spacewatch	·	660 m	MPC · JPL
511082	2013 TJ_{85}	—	September 6, 2013	Kitt Peak	Spacewatch	(2076)	630 m	MPC · JPL
511083	2013 TD_{92}	—	October 20, 2003	Palomar	NEAT	·	720 m	MPC · JPL
511084	2013 TV_{96}	—	January 24, 2007	Mount Lemmon	Mount Lemmon Survey	NYS	1.0 km	MPC · JPL
511085	2013 TH_{98}	—	October 2, 2013	Kitt Peak	Spacewatch	·	950 m	MPC · JPL
511086	2013 TO_{101}	—	November 21, 2006	Mount Lemmon	Mount Lemmon Survey	·	770 m	MPC · JPL
511087	2013 TJ_{108}	—	December 12, 2006	Mount Lemmon	Mount Lemmon Survey	MAS	610 m	MPC · JPL
511088	2013 TT_{113}	—	January 26, 2011	Mount Lemmon	Mount Lemmon Survey	·	910 m	MPC · JPL
511089	2013 TO_{116}	—	November 2, 2006	Mount Lemmon	Mount Lemmon Survey	·	770 m	MPC · JPL
511090	2013 TF_{121}	—	April 19, 2012	Mount Lemmon	Mount Lemmon Survey	·	930 m	MPC · JPL
511091	2013 TR_{136}	—	October 4, 2006	Mount Lemmon	Mount Lemmon Survey	·	910 m	MPC · JPL
511092	2013 TS_{137}	—	October 3, 2006	Mount Lemmon	Mount Lemmon Survey	·	600 m	MPC · JPL
511093	2013 TZ_{138}	—	December 26, 2006	Kitt Peak	Spacewatch	·	910 m	MPC · JPL
511094	2013 TK_{139}	—	November 19, 2006	Kitt Peak	Spacewatch	NYS	880 m	MPC · JPL
511095	2013 TN_{139}	—	September 16, 2009	Catalina	CSS	·	1.1 km	MPC · JPL
511096	2013 TO_{139}	—	September 12, 2013	Catalina	CSS	·	1.8 km	MPC · JPL
511097	2013 TG_{140}	—	March 10, 2008	Mount Lemmon	Mount Lemmon Survey	·	850 m	MPC · JPL
511098	2013 TV_{140}	—	December 15, 2006	Kitt Peak	Spacewatch	MAS	530 m	MPC · JPL
511099	2013 TV_{159}	—	October 2, 2013	Mount Lemmon	Mount Lemmon Survey	L5	6.3 km	MPC · JPL
511100	2013 UV_{4}	—	July 14, 2009	Kitt Peak	Spacewatch	·	1.4 km	MPC · JPL

== 511101–511200 ==
back to top

Designation			Discovery			Properties		Ref
Permanent	Provisional	Named after	Date	Site	Discoverer(s)	Category	Diam.	Ref
511101	2013 UL_{14}	—	January 17, 2007	Kitt Peak	Spacewatch	MAS	720 m	MPC · JPL
511102	2013 VD_{2}	—	October 14, 2013	Catalina	CSS	PHO	1.1 km	MPC · JPL
511103	2013 VE_{4}	—	February 23, 2011	Kitt Peak	Spacewatch	·	1.2 km	MPC · JPL
511104	2013 VO_{21}	—	May 24, 2006	Mount Lemmon	Mount Lemmon Survey	·	800 m	MPC · JPL
511105	2013 VP_{21}	—	October 12, 2013	Catalina	CSS	·	990 m	MPC · JPL
511106	2013 VK_{22}	—	March 29, 2011	Mount Lemmon	Mount Lemmon Survey	·	910 m	MPC · JPL
511107	2013 VV_{24}	—	February 15, 2010	Mount Lemmon	Mount Lemmon Survey	RAF	750 m	MPC · JPL
511108	2013 WE	—	November 21, 1995	Kitt Peak	Spacewatch	·	1.3 km	MPC · JPL
511109	2013 WP	—	March 19, 2010	WISE	WISE	·	4.1 km	MPC · JPL
511110	2013 WB_{1}	—	October 14, 2009	Mount Lemmon	Mount Lemmon Survey	·	1.3 km	MPC · JPL
511111	2013 WL_{4}	—	October 25, 2013	Kitt Peak	Spacewatch	·	970 m	MPC · JPL
511112	2013 WC_{14}	—	November 27, 2013	Haleakala	Pan-STARRS 1	·	1.1 km	MPC · JPL
511113	2013 WM_{18}	—	October 12, 1998	Kitt Peak	Spacewatch	·	950 m	MPC · JPL
511114	2013 WX_{24}	—	September 26, 2009	Kitt Peak	Spacewatch	·	1.1 km	MPC · JPL
511115	2013 WQ_{26}	—	August 21, 2009	La Sagra	OAM	·	1.1 km	MPC · JPL
511116	2013 WL_{43}	—	March 11, 2011	Kitt Peak	Spacewatch	·	940 m	MPC · JPL
511117	2013 WK_{46}	—	January 26, 2007	Kitt Peak	Spacewatch	NYS	1.1 km	MPC · JPL
511118	2013 WE_{47}	—	November 19, 1995	Kitt Peak	Spacewatch	·	850 m	MPC · JPL
511119	2013 WQ_{54}	—	January 24, 2007	Mount Lemmon	Mount Lemmon Survey	·	1.1 km	MPC · JPL
511120	2013 WJ_{56}	—	August 29, 2009	Kitt Peak	Spacewatch	·	820 m	MPC · JPL
511121	2013 WZ_{57}	—	September 13, 1998	Kitt Peak	Spacewatch	MAS	660 m	MPC · JPL
511122	2013 WF_{58}	—	September 20, 2009	Kitt Peak	Spacewatch	·	960 m	MPC · JPL
511123	2013 WB_{59}	—	August 18, 2009	Kitt Peak	Spacewatch	MAS	670 m	MPC · JPL
511124	2013 WR_{63}	—	March 27, 2011	Kitt Peak	Spacewatch	·	1.7 km	MPC · JPL
511125	2013 WW_{74}	—	November 9, 2013	Haleakala	Pan-STARRS 1	V	840 m	MPC · JPL
511126	2013 WQ_{80}	—	May 12, 2011	Mount Lemmon	Mount Lemmon Survey	HNS	1.3 km	MPC · JPL
511127	2013 WD_{92}	—	December 1, 1996	Kitt Peak	Spacewatch	·	1.4 km	MPC · JPL
511128	2013 WN_{97}	—	October 9, 2013	Mount Lemmon	Mount Lemmon Survey	·	1.1 km	MPC · JPL
511129	2013 WZ_{105}	—	October 27, 2013	Catalina	CSS	·	2.4 km	MPC · JPL
511130	2013 WV_{107}	—	November 25, 2013	Haleakala	Pan-STARRS 1	centaur	60 km	MPC · JPL
511131	2013 XM_{9}	—	October 17, 2009	Mount Lemmon	Mount Lemmon Survey	·	1.1 km	MPC · JPL
511132	2013 XA_{14}	—	December 13, 2006	Kitt Peak	Spacewatch	·	820 m	MPC · JPL
511133	2013 XQ_{17}	—	June 3, 2011	Mount Lemmon	Mount Lemmon Survey	·	2.1 km	MPC · JPL
511134	2013 XJ_{18}	—	November 16, 2009	Kitt Peak	Spacewatch	·	640 m	MPC · JPL
511135	2013 XR_{19}	—	January 25, 2010	WISE	WISE	·	1.9 km	MPC · JPL
511136	2013 XO_{23}	—	January 9, 2010	Mount Lemmon	Mount Lemmon Survey	·	1.5 km	MPC · JPL
511137	2013 XM_{24}	—	December 13, 2013	Mount Lemmon	Mount Lemmon Survey	APO	570 m	MPC · JPL
511138	2013 XN_{26}	—	February 19, 2010	Mount Lemmon	Mount Lemmon Survey	·	870 m	MPC · JPL
511139	2013 YR_{1}	—	December 20, 2009	Mount Lemmon	Mount Lemmon Survey	·	1.0 km	MPC · JPL
511140	2013 YJ_{2}	—	April 8, 2010	Siding Spring	SSS	·	1.4 km	MPC · JPL
511141	2013 YX_{3}	—	September 27, 2009	Mount Lemmon	Mount Lemmon Survey	·	1.0 km	MPC · JPL
511142	2013 YG_{4}	—	January 30, 2006	Kitt Peak	Spacewatch	·	810 m	MPC · JPL
511143	2013 YU_{4}	—	October 7, 2004	Kitt Peak	Spacewatch	(5)	1.0 km	MPC · JPL
511144	2013 YX_{6}	—	April 28, 2003	Kitt Peak	Spacewatch	·	1.8 km	MPC · JPL
511145	2013 YY_{6}	—	March 31, 2005	Socorro	LINEAR	·	2.1 km	MPC · JPL
511146	2013 YH_{14}	—	December 10, 2013	Mount Lemmon	Mount Lemmon Survey	EUN	1.2 km	MPC · JPL
511147	2013 YJ_{20}	—	January 22, 2006	Anderson Mesa	LONEOS	(5)	1.1 km	MPC · JPL
511148	2013 YU_{27}	—	January 8, 2006	Mount Lemmon	Mount Lemmon Survey	·	870 m	MPC · JPL
511149	2013 YZ_{27}	—	December 10, 2013	Mount Lemmon	Mount Lemmon Survey	MAR	890 m	MPC · JPL
511150	2013 YL_{28}	—	January 5, 2006	Mount Lemmon	Mount Lemmon Survey	·	1.1 km	MPC · JPL
511151	2013 YM_{29}	—	October 28, 2006	Mount Lemmon	Mount Lemmon Survey	·	820 m	MPC · JPL
511152	2013 YP_{32}	—	December 25, 2013	Mount Lemmon	Mount Lemmon Survey	·	1.7 km	MPC · JPL
511153	2013 YV_{37}	—	February 13, 2010	Mount Lemmon	Mount Lemmon Survey	·	890 m	MPC · JPL
511154	2013 YS_{38}	—	June 7, 2010	WISE	WISE	BAR	970 m	MPC · JPL
511155	2013 YR_{39}	—	October 6, 2012	Haleakala	Pan-STARRS 1	·	2.3 km	MPC · JPL
511156	2013 YU_{39}	—	December 24, 2013	Mount Lemmon	Mount Lemmon Survey	HNS	1.0 km	MPC · JPL
511157	2013 YC_{40}	—	February 14, 2010	Mount Lemmon	Mount Lemmon Survey	·	1.1 km	MPC · JPL
511158	2013 YR_{40}	—	January 11, 2003	Kitt Peak	Spacewatch	·	840 m	MPC · JPL
511159	2013 YV_{40}	—	March 12, 2011	Mount Lemmon	Mount Lemmon Survey	·	1.1 km	MPC · JPL
511160	2013 YO_{41}	—	March 7, 2010	WISE	WISE	·	860 m	MPC · JPL
511161	2013 YB_{42}	—	March 10, 2007	Mount Lemmon	Mount Lemmon Survey	NYS	930 m	MPC · JPL
511162	2013 YV_{42}	—	August 2, 2008	Siding Spring	SSS	·	1.6 km	MPC · JPL
511163	2013 YF_{43}	—	November 16, 2009	Mount Lemmon	Mount Lemmon Survey	·	1.3 km	MPC · JPL
511164	2013 YW_{44}	—	January 23, 2006	Kitt Peak	Spacewatch	KON	2.2 km	MPC · JPL
511165	2013 YS_{45}	—	December 4, 2013	Haleakala	Pan-STARRS 1	·	1.3 km	MPC · JPL
511166	2013 YJ_{49}	—	December 24, 2013	Mount Lemmon	Mount Lemmon Survey	·	1.5 km	MPC · JPL
511167	2013 YC_{56}	—	November 8, 2013	Mount Lemmon	Mount Lemmon Survey	MAR	1.1 km	MPC · JPL
511168	2013 YX_{57}	—	March 28, 2011	Mount Lemmon	Mount Lemmon Survey	·	900 m	MPC · JPL
511169	2013 YO_{60}	—	September 5, 2008	Kitt Peak	Spacewatch	·	1.5 km	MPC · JPL
511170	2013 YL_{62}	—	January 5, 2006	Mount Lemmon	Mount Lemmon Survey	·	1.1 km	MPC · JPL
511171	2013 YM_{62}	—	June 5, 2010	WISE	WISE	ADE	3.3 km	MPC · JPL
511172	2013 YV_{63}	—	February 21, 2006	Catalina	CSS	·	1.1 km	MPC · JPL
511173	2013 YR_{69}	—	February 3, 2001	Kitt Peak	Spacewatch	·	1.1 km	MPC · JPL
511174	2013 YL_{73}	—	April 11, 2007	Catalina	CSS	·	1.6 km	MPC · JPL
511175	2013 YO_{73}	—	March 5, 2010	WISE	WISE	·	1.9 km	MPC · JPL
511176	2013 YK_{75}	—	October 9, 2008	Mount Lemmon	Mount Lemmon Survey	·	1.0 km	MPC · JPL
511177	2013 YM_{78}	—	January 12, 2010	Catalina	CSS	·	1.7 km	MPC · JPL
511178	2013 YR_{82}	—	December 19, 2004	Mount Lemmon	Mount Lemmon Survey	·	1.7 km	MPC · JPL
511179	2013 YO_{83}	—	August 26, 2012	Haleakala	Pan-STARRS 1	·	1.3 km	MPC · JPL
511180	2013 YE_{93}	—	December 14, 2013	Mount Lemmon	Mount Lemmon Survey	·	1.1 km	MPC · JPL
511181	2013 YF_{95}	—	January 27, 2006	Kitt Peak	Spacewatch	(5)	920 m	MPC · JPL
511182	2013 YD_{102}	—	December 25, 2013	Mount Lemmon	Mount Lemmon Survey	·	1.0 km	MPC · JPL
511183	2013 YK_{107}	—	October 7, 2012	Haleakala	Pan-STARRS 1	HNS	1.3 km	MPC · JPL
511184	2013 YC_{108}	—	October 21, 2009	Mount Lemmon	Mount Lemmon Survey	·	880 m	MPC · JPL
511185	2013 YX_{108}	—	December 6, 2013	Haleakala	Pan-STARRS 1	·	1.5 km	MPC · JPL
511186	2013 YZ_{108}	—	December 25, 2013	Mount Lemmon	Mount Lemmon Survey	·	1.9 km	MPC · JPL
511187	2013 YA_{109}	—	December 25, 2013	Kitt Peak	Spacewatch	·	870 m	MPC · JPL
511188	2013 YC_{109}	—	December 31, 2013	Haleakala	Pan-STARRS 1	·	1.1 km	MPC · JPL
511189	2013 YH_{111}	—	December 28, 2013	Kitt Peak	Spacewatch	EUN	1.2 km	MPC · JPL
511190	2013 YA_{112}	—	December 25, 2005	Mount Lemmon	Mount Lemmon Survey	·	910 m	MPC · JPL
511191	2013 YM_{114}	—	February 14, 2010	Mount Lemmon	Mount Lemmon Survey	KON	1.6 km	MPC · JPL
511192	2013 YJ_{118}	—	March 24, 2003	Kitt Peak	Spacewatch	NYS	1.0 km	MPC · JPL
511193	2013 YK_{119}	—	October 26, 2008	Catalina	CSS	·	2.1 km	MPC · JPL
511194	2013 YB_{124}	—	November 4, 2004	Kitt Peak	Spacewatch	·	980 m	MPC · JPL
511195	2013 YL_{124}	—	December 30, 2013	Kitt Peak	Spacewatch	·	1.3 km	MPC · JPL
511196	2013 YM_{124}	—	November 28, 2013	Mount Lemmon	Mount Lemmon Survey	·	1.4 km	MPC · JPL
511197	2013 YQ_{125}	—	August 24, 2012	Kitt Peak	Spacewatch	·	1.9 km	MPC · JPL
511198	2013 YC_{128}	—	January 6, 2010	Kitt Peak	Spacewatch	·	990 m	MPC · JPL
511199	2013 YO_{129}	—	December 9, 2004	Kitt Peak	Spacewatch	·	1.1 km	MPC · JPL
511200	2013 YV_{129}	—	December 15, 2004	Kitt Peak	Spacewatch	·	1.2 km	MPC · JPL

== 511201–511300 ==
back to top

Designation			Discovery			Properties		Ref
Permanent	Provisional	Named after	Date	Site	Discoverer(s)	Category	Diam.	Ref
511201	2013 YT_{138}	—	December 6, 2013	Haleakala	Pan-STARRS 1	·	1.2 km	MPC · JPL
511202	2013 YU_{142}	—	December 13, 2013	Mount Lemmon	Mount Lemmon Survey	·	1.7 km	MPC · JPL
511203	2013 YW_{143}	—	November 17, 2009	Mount Lemmon	Mount Lemmon Survey	·	1.2 km	MPC · JPL
511204	2013 YB_{147}	—	February 14, 2010	Mount Lemmon	Mount Lemmon Survey	·	1.1 km	MPC · JPL
511205	2013 YV_{149}	—	October 1, 2013	Mount Lemmon	Mount Lemmon Survey	·	1.3 km	MPC · JPL
511206	2013 YB_{152}	—	January 5, 2006	Mount Lemmon	Mount Lemmon Survey	·	1.2 km	MPC · JPL
511207	2014 AL_{7}	—	January 1, 2014	Haleakala	Pan-STARRS 1	·	1.6 km	MPC · JPL
511208	2014 AK_{9}	—	May 26, 2011	Mount Lemmon	Mount Lemmon Survey	·	1.3 km	MPC · JPL
511209	2014 AH_{14}	—	January 1, 2014	Haleakala	Pan-STARRS 1	MAR	890 m	MPC · JPL
511210	2014 AW_{19}	—	January 1, 2014	Kitt Peak	Spacewatch	EUN	950 m	MPC · JPL
511211	2014 AY_{19}	—	August 4, 2012	Haleakala	Pan-STARRS 1	·	1.1 km	MPC · JPL
511212	2014 AR_{21}	—	January 3, 2014	Kitt Peak	Spacewatch	PHO	700 m	MPC · JPL
511213	2014 AZ_{21}	—	February 15, 2010	Mount Lemmon	Mount Lemmon Survey	·	1.1 km	MPC · JPL
511214	2014 AA_{22}	—	December 13, 2013	Mount Lemmon	Mount Lemmon Survey	·	1.2 km	MPC · JPL
511215	2014 AM_{22}	—	December 8, 2005	Kitt Peak	Spacewatch	·	1.1 km	MPC · JPL
511216	2014 AY_{31}	—	February 9, 2010	Kitt Peak	Spacewatch	·	1.4 km	MPC · JPL
511217	2014 AH_{48}	—	December 26, 2013	Kitt Peak	Spacewatch	·	970 m	MPC · JPL
511218	2014 AP_{48}	—	October 26, 2008	Mount Lemmon	Mount Lemmon Survey	·	1.9 km	MPC · JPL
511219	2014 AG_{49}	—	October 8, 2012	Haleakala	Pan-STARRS 1	·	1.3 km	MPC · JPL
511220	2014 AY_{52}	—	October 6, 2012	Mount Lemmon	Mount Lemmon Survey	·	1.9 km	MPC · JPL
511221	2014 AV_{54}	—	January 12, 2010	Mount Lemmon	Mount Lemmon Survey	·	850 m	MPC · JPL
511222	2014 AK_{56}	—	September 6, 2008	Kitt Peak	Spacewatch	·	940 m	MPC · JPL
511223	2014 AW_{56}	—	October 8, 2004	Anderson Mesa	LONEOS	(5)	1.5 km	MPC · JPL
511224	2014 AZ_{56}	—	March 4, 2006	Catalina	CSS	·	1.0 km	MPC · JPL
511225	2014 BK_{1}	—	December 31, 2013	Kitt Peak	Spacewatch	·	1.5 km	MPC · JPL
511226	2014 BR_{3}	—	February 14, 2010	Catalina	CSS	·	1.6 km	MPC · JPL
511227	2014 BO_{4}	—	March 16, 2007	Mount Lemmon	Mount Lemmon Survey	·	1.1 km	MPC · JPL
511228	2014 BW_{6}	—	January 11, 2010	Kitt Peak	Spacewatch	·	1.4 km	MPC · JPL
511229	2014 BC_{8}	—	May 26, 2010	WISE	WISE	KON	1.9 km	MPC · JPL
511230	2014 BK_{10}	—	April 26, 2010	Mount Lemmon	Mount Lemmon Survey	(40134)	2.0 km	MPC · JPL
511231	2014 BJ_{11}	—	December 19, 2009	Mount Lemmon	Mount Lemmon Survey	(5)	980 m	MPC · JPL
511232	2014 BG_{12}	—	June 26, 2010	WISE	WISE	·	1.7 km	MPC · JPL
511233	2014 BH_{12}	—	January 11, 2010	Kitt Peak	Spacewatch	EUN	950 m	MPC · JPL
511234	2014 BV_{12}	—	September 24, 2008	Mount Lemmon	Mount Lemmon Survey	·	1.2 km	MPC · JPL
511235	2014 BF_{14}	—	March 11, 2005	Mount Lemmon	Mount Lemmon Survey	·	1.7 km	MPC · JPL
511236	2014 BU_{14}	—	February 7, 2002	Socorro	LINEAR	·	2.0 km	MPC · JPL
511237	2014 BA_{16}	—	September 22, 2008	Catalina	CSS	EUN	1.4 km	MPC · JPL
511238 Cuixiangqun	2014 BK_{17}	Cuixiangqun	November 27, 2013	XuYi	PMO NEO Survey Program	HNS	1.4 km	MPC · JPL
511239	2014 BF_{19}	—	December 30, 2013	Mount Lemmon	Mount Lemmon Survey	·	1.6 km	MPC · JPL
511240	2014 BW_{24}	—	October 26, 2012	Haleakala	Pan-STARRS 1	·	1.9 km	MPC · JPL
511241	2014 BR_{29}	—	May 27, 2010	WISE	WISE	·	1.6 km	MPC · JPL
511242	2014 BX_{29}	—	October 8, 2008	Kitt Peak	Spacewatch	·	1.0 km	MPC · JPL
511243	2014 BS_{32}	—	March 20, 2010	WISE	WISE	AMO +1km	1.2 km	MPC · JPL
511244	2014 BS_{33}	—	December 11, 2013	Mount Lemmon	Mount Lemmon Survey	·	1.1 km	MPC · JPL
511245	2014 BC_{34}	—	October 1, 2008	Mount Lemmon	Mount Lemmon Survey	·	1.2 km	MPC · JPL
511246	2014 BT_{35}	—	October 22, 2008	Mount Lemmon	Mount Lemmon Survey	·	1.2 km	MPC · JPL
511247	2014 BN_{36}	—	February 17, 2010	Kitt Peak	Spacewatch	·	1.1 km	MPC · JPL
511248	2014 BT_{38}	—	January 23, 2014	Mount Lemmon	Mount Lemmon Survey	HNS	1.1 km	MPC · JPL
511249	2014 BC_{40}	—	April 8, 2006	Mount Lemmon	Mount Lemmon Survey	(5)	1.1 km	MPC · JPL
511250	2014 BD_{47}	—	February 13, 2010	Kitt Peak	Spacewatch	(5)	930 m	MPC · JPL
511251	2014 BD_{48}	—	January 15, 2010	Mount Lemmon	Mount Lemmon Survey	·	1.7 km	MPC · JPL
511252	2014 BL_{48}	—	January 23, 2014	Mount Lemmon	Mount Lemmon Survey	LIX	2.7 km	MPC · JPL
511253	2014 BR_{48}	—	September 23, 2008	Kitt Peak	Spacewatch	(5)	1 km	MPC · JPL
511254	2014 BV_{54}	—	January 11, 2010	Kitt Peak	Spacewatch	EUN	950 m	MPC · JPL
511255	2014 BM_{61}	—	October 8, 2012	Haleakala	Pan-STARRS 1	·	1.3 km	MPC · JPL
511256	2014 BN_{63}	—	January 2, 2014	Kitt Peak	Spacewatch	HNS	1.0 km	MPC · JPL
511257	2014 BO_{65}	—	December 30, 2008	Kitt Peak	Spacewatch	·	2.0 km	MPC · JPL
511258	2014 BS_{65}	—	February 27, 2006	Mount Lemmon	Mount Lemmon Survey	EUN	900 m	MPC · JPL
511259	2014 CC	—	June 22, 2010	WISE	WISE	ADE	1.8 km	MPC · JPL
511260	2014 CF_{4}	—	December 31, 2013	Kitt Peak	Spacewatch	NYS	1.0 km	MPC · JPL
511261	2014 CQ_{4}	—	February 6, 2014	Mount Lemmon	Mount Lemmon Survey	·	1.4 km	MPC · JPL
511262	2014 CO_{11}	—	March 12, 2010	Mount Lemmon	Mount Lemmon Survey	·	1.1 km	MPC · JPL
511263	2014 CT_{17}	—	October 8, 2012	Haleakala	Pan-STARRS 1	·	1.6 km	MPC · JPL
511264	2014 CX_{18}	—	February 9, 2014	Haleakala	Pan-STARRS 1	·	1.5 km	MPC · JPL
511265	2014 CP_{19}	—	March 20, 2010	Kitt Peak	Spacewatch	·	1.2 km	MPC · JPL
511266	2014 CH_{20}	—	March 26, 2010	WISE	WISE	·	3.6 km	MPC · JPL
511267	2014 CE_{21}	—	January 29, 2014	Kitt Peak	Spacewatch	·	1.3 km	MPC · JPL
511268	2014 CC_{24}	—	September 24, 2011	Mount Lemmon	Mount Lemmon Survey	·	2.7 km	MPC · JPL
511269	2014 CK_{24}	—	September 24, 2008	Mount Lemmon	Mount Lemmon Survey	·	1.3 km	MPC · JPL
511270	2014 DB_{1}	—	March 23, 2006	Mount Lemmon	Mount Lemmon Survey	·	880 m	MPC · JPL
511271	2014 DL_{4}	—	January 3, 2014	Mount Lemmon	Mount Lemmon Survey	EUN	870 m	MPC · JPL
511272	2014 DM_{4}	—	April 7, 2010	Kitt Peak	Spacewatch	·	1.7 km	MPC · JPL
511273	2014 DN_{14}	—	November 9, 2008	Kitt Peak	Spacewatch	BRG	1.3 km	MPC · JPL
511274	2014 DP_{15}	—	December 4, 2008	Kitt Peak	Spacewatch	·	1.5 km	MPC · JPL
511275	2014 DX_{15}	—	October 8, 2007	Mount Lemmon	Mount Lemmon Survey	·	1.5 km	MPC · JPL
511276	2014 DD_{16}	—	August 27, 2011	Haleakala	Pan-STARRS 1	·	2.0 km	MPC · JPL
511277	2014 DA_{20}	—	August 27, 2011	Haleakala	Pan-STARRS 1	·	2.6 km	MPC · JPL
511278	2014 DJ_{28}	—	January 1, 2009	Kitt Peak	Spacewatch	·	1.9 km	MPC · JPL
511279	2014 DK_{29}	—	March 4, 2005	Mount Lemmon	Mount Lemmon Survey	·	1.5 km	MPC · JPL
511280	2014 DO_{30}	—	February 10, 2014	Haleakala	Pan-STARRS 1	·	1.8 km	MPC · JPL
511281	2014 DU_{33}	—	October 21, 2007	Kitt Peak	Spacewatch	·	1.8 km	MPC · JPL
511282	2014 DR_{38}	—	October 27, 2008	Kitt Peak	Spacewatch	·	1.3 km	MPC · JPL
511283	2014 DA_{39}	—	February 23, 2003	Kitt Peak	Spacewatch	·	2.9 km	MPC · JPL
511284	2014 DW_{40}	—	March 18, 2010	Mount Lemmon	Mount Lemmon Survey	·	1.2 km	MPC · JPL
511285	2014 DS_{42}	—	February 25, 2014	Kitt Peak	Spacewatch	·	2.4 km	MPC · JPL
511286	2014 DH_{43}	—	November 17, 2007	Kitt Peak	Spacewatch	AGN	1.1 km	MPC · JPL
511287	2014 DP_{46}	—	September 13, 2007	Kitt Peak	Spacewatch	·	2.2 km	MPC · JPL
511288	2014 DV_{51}	—	February 10, 2014	Haleakala	Pan-STARRS 1	MRX	1.0 km	MPC · JPL
511289	2014 DB_{58}	—	September 3, 2008	Kitt Peak	Spacewatch	·	1.1 km	MPC · JPL
511290	2014 DA_{59}	—	October 9, 2012	Haleakala	Pan-STARRS 1	JUN	780 m	MPC · JPL
511291	2014 DW_{61}	—	May 24, 2006	Kitt Peak	Spacewatch	BRG	1.3 km	MPC · JPL
511292	2014 DN_{62}	—	February 26, 2014	Haleakala	Pan-STARRS 1	·	1.8 km	MPC · JPL
511293	2014 DU_{63}	—	September 14, 2007	Mount Lemmon	Mount Lemmon Survey	·	1.6 km	MPC · JPL
511294	2014 DR_{65}	—	January 27, 2010	WISE	WISE	·	1.7 km	MPC · JPL
511295	2014 DH_{66}	—	October 6, 2012	Haleakala	Pan-STARRS 1	BRG	1.2 km	MPC · JPL
511296	2014 DO_{66}	—	February 26, 2014	Haleakala	Pan-STARRS 1	EUN	1.1 km	MPC · JPL
511297	2014 DK_{67}	—	February 26, 2014	Haleakala	Pan-STARRS 1	·	1.8 km	MPC · JPL
511298	2014 DF_{70}	—	February 26, 2014	Haleakala	Pan-STARRS 1	·	1.4 km	MPC · JPL
511299	2014 DL_{70}	—	October 22, 2003	Apache Point	SDSS	·	1.4 km	MPC · JPL
511300	2014 DM_{70}	—	April 9, 2010	Kitt Peak	Spacewatch	·	1 km	MPC · JPL

== 511301–511400 ==
back to top

Designation			Discovery			Properties		Ref
Permanent	Provisional	Named after	Date	Site	Discoverer(s)	Category	Diam.	Ref
511301	2014 DO_{72}	—	October 18, 2011	Haleakala	Pan-STARRS 1	·	2.6 km	MPC · JPL
511302	2014 DR_{73}	—	February 27, 2001	Kitt Peak	Spacewatch	·	1.3 km	MPC · JPL
511303	2014 DO_{78}	—	December 31, 2008	Kitt Peak	Spacewatch	·	1.5 km	MPC · JPL
511304	2014 DU_{83}	—	October 17, 2012	Haleakala	Pan-STARRS 1	MRX	1.0 km	MPC · JPL
511305	2014 DO_{84}	—	February 25, 2014	Kitt Peak	Spacewatch	·	1.5 km	MPC · JPL
511306	2014 DH_{87}	—	October 17, 2012	Mount Lemmon	Mount Lemmon Survey	·	1.5 km	MPC · JPL
511307	2014 DJ_{88}	—	December 30, 2008	Kitt Peak	Spacewatch	AEO	1.1 km	MPC · JPL
511308	2014 DF_{90}	—	February 10, 2014	Haleakala	Pan-STARRS 1	·	2.4 km	MPC · JPL
511309	2014 DF_{96}	—	October 20, 2012	Haleakala	Pan-STARRS 1	EUN	1.1 km	MPC · JPL
511310	2014 DO_{98}	—	September 21, 2011	Mount Lemmon	Mount Lemmon Survey	·	1.4 km	MPC · JPL
511311	2014 DD_{107}	—	October 12, 2007	Kitt Peak	Spacewatch	·	1.8 km	MPC · JPL
511312	2014 DH_{109}	—	September 24, 2011	Haleakala	Pan-STARRS 1	·	1.9 km	MPC · JPL
511313	2014 DL_{110}	—	September 23, 2011	Haleakala	Pan-STARRS 1	·	2.2 km	MPC · JPL
511314	2014 DY_{116}	—	December 29, 2000	Kitt Peak	Spacewatch	·	1.0 km	MPC · JPL
511315	2014 DY_{117}	—	October 19, 2012	Haleakala	Pan-STARRS 1	·	1.3 km	MPC · JPL
511316	2014 DL_{118}	—	October 1, 2008	Kitt Peak	Spacewatch	·	1.1 km	MPC · JPL
511317	2014 DP_{118}	—	October 18, 2012	Haleakala	Pan-STARRS 1	·	1.6 km	MPC · JPL
511318	2014 DV_{120}	—	October 6, 2012	Haleakala	Pan-STARRS 1	·	1.5 km	MPC · JPL
511319	2014 DW_{122}	—	January 2, 2014	Mount Lemmon	Mount Lemmon Survey	·	2.1 km	MPC · JPL
511320	2014 DF_{124}	—	October 21, 2012	Haleakala	Pan-STARRS 1	MRX	1.2 km	MPC · JPL
511321	2014 DX_{124}	—	July 26, 2011	Haleakala	Pan-STARRS 1	·	1.3 km	MPC · JPL
511322	2014 DE_{128}	—	March 11, 2005	Kitt Peak	Spacewatch	·	1.8 km	MPC · JPL
511323	2014 DU_{128}	—	October 21, 2012	Haleakala	Pan-STARRS 1	·	1.3 km	MPC · JPL
511324	2014 DY_{129}	—	February 1, 2005	Kitt Peak	Spacewatch	·	1.2 km	MPC · JPL
511325	2014 DU_{133}	—	November 2, 2007	Mount Lemmon	Mount Lemmon Survey	·	1.6 km	MPC · JPL
511326	2014 DB_{140}	—	April 30, 2006	Kitt Peak	Spacewatch	·	1.0 km	MPC · JPL
511327	2014 DU_{145}	—	December 11, 2004	Catalina	CSS	EUN	1.6 km	MPC · JPL
511328	2014 DF_{146}	—	February 13, 2008	Kitt Peak	Spacewatch	·	2.6 km	MPC · JPL
511329	2014 DG_{146}	—	February 28, 2014	Haleakala	Pan-STARRS 1	TIR	2.9 km	MPC · JPL
511330	2014 DJ_{146}	—	March 18, 2009	Mount Lemmon	Mount Lemmon Survey	·	2.0 km	MPC · JPL
511331	2014 ER_{3}	—	July 27, 2011	Haleakala	Pan-STARRS 1	·	1.4 km	MPC · JPL
511332	2014 EC_{9}	—	January 29, 2014	Mount Lemmon	Mount Lemmon Survey	·	1.7 km	MPC · JPL
511333	2014 EQ_{13}	—	December 13, 2013	Mount Lemmon	Mount Lemmon Survey	(5)	1.2 km	MPC · JPL
511334	2014 EU_{13}	—	August 25, 2012	Haleakala	Pan-STARRS 1	·	1.5 km	MPC · JPL
511335	2014 EV_{13}	—	February 9, 2014	Haleakala	Pan-STARRS 1	·	2.6 km	MPC · JPL
511336	2014 EQ_{14}	—	October 2, 2008	Kitt Peak	Spacewatch	(5)	970 m	MPC · JPL
511337	2014 EN_{16}	—	September 21, 2012	Mount Lemmon	Mount Lemmon Survey	·	1.4 km	MPC · JPL
511338	2014 EU_{19}	—	October 4, 2007	Kitt Peak	Spacewatch	·	1.9 km	MPC · JPL
511339	2014 EG_{22}	—	April 8, 2010	Mount Lemmon	Mount Lemmon Survey	·	890 m	MPC · JPL
511340	2014 EW_{23}	—	February 10, 2014	Haleakala	Pan-STARRS 1	EUN	1.2 km	MPC · JPL
511341	2014 ED_{25}	—	November 24, 2008	Mount Lemmon	Mount Lemmon Survey	·	1.9 km	MPC · JPL
511342	2014 EA_{28}	—	January 15, 2009	Kitt Peak	Spacewatch	·	1.3 km	MPC · JPL
511343	2014 EJ_{36}	—	October 6, 2012	Haleakala	Pan-STARRS 1	·	1.7 km	MPC · JPL
511344	2014 EJ_{39}	—	February 9, 2008	Mount Lemmon	Mount Lemmon Survey	·	2.9 km	MPC · JPL
511345	2014 EZ_{42}	—	February 9, 2014	Haleakala	Pan-STARRS 1	·	2.4 km	MPC · JPL
511346	2014 ET_{44}	—	July 4, 2010	WISE	WISE	·	2.5 km	MPC · JPL
511347	2014 EM_{46}	—	February 28, 2009	Mount Lemmon	Mount Lemmon Survey	EOS	2.2 km	MPC · JPL
511348	2014 EU_{47}	—	April 15, 2010	Mount Lemmon	Mount Lemmon Survey	ADE	2.1 km	MPC · JPL
511349	2014 EL_{48}	—	February 26, 2014	Mount Lemmon	Mount Lemmon Survey	·	1.4 km	MPC · JPL
511350	2014 EF_{49}	—	October 7, 2008	Kitt Peak	Spacewatch	V	650 m	MPC · JPL
511351	2014 EH_{52}	—	February 9, 2005	Mount Lemmon	Mount Lemmon Survey	·	1.5 km	MPC · JPL
511352	2014 FW_{1}	—	May 6, 2006	Mount Lemmon	Mount Lemmon Survey	·	2.2 km	MPC · JPL
511353	2014 FR_{2}	—	April 27, 2009	Kitt Peak	Spacewatch	·	2.3 km	MPC · JPL
511354	2014 FV_{2}	—	October 16, 2011	Haleakala	Pan-STARRS 1	EOS	2.0 km	MPC · JPL
511355	2014 FQ_{3}	—	April 11, 2005	Kitt Peak	Spacewatch	·	2.4 km	MPC · JPL
511356	2014 FH_{4}	—	February 10, 2014	Haleakala	Pan-STARRS 1	·	1.3 km	MPC · JPL
511357	2014 FL_{10}	—	May 8, 2005	Mount Lemmon	Mount Lemmon Survey	·	1.4 km	MPC · JPL
511358	2014 FW_{14}	—	September 19, 2012	Mount Lemmon	Mount Lemmon Survey	(194)	1.5 km	MPC · JPL
511359	2014 FA_{15}	—	December 10, 2004	Socorro	LINEAR	·	1.3 km	MPC · JPL
511360	2014 FP_{20}	—	August 31, 2011	Haleakala	Pan-STARRS 1	EOS	1.9 km	MPC · JPL
511361	2014 FV_{28}	—	November 7, 2007	Kitt Peak	Spacewatch	·	1.6 km	MPC · JPL
511362	2014 FQ_{32}	—	March 10, 2005	Anderson Mesa	LONEOS	JUN	980 m	MPC · JPL
511363	2014 FM_{36}	—	July 5, 2010	Mount Lemmon	Mount Lemmon Survey	·	2.0 km	MPC · JPL
511364	2014 FU_{36}	—	February 24, 2010	WISE	WISE	·	1.2 km	MPC · JPL
511365	2014 FZ_{40}	—	February 28, 2014	Haleakala	Pan-STARRS 1	·	1.9 km	MPC · JPL
511366	2014 FQ_{41}	—	December 10, 2012	Haleakala	Pan-STARRS 1	·	1.9 km	MPC · JPL
511367	2014 FW_{45}	—	March 12, 2014	Mount Lemmon	Mount Lemmon Survey	·	2.0 km	MPC · JPL
511368	2014 FJ_{49}	—	March 9, 2014	Haleakala	Pan-STARRS 1	·	1.5 km	MPC · JPL
511369	2014 FX_{50}	—	March 18, 2010	Mount Lemmon	Mount Lemmon Survey	·	1.1 km	MPC · JPL
511370	2014 FQ_{57}	—	March 17, 2005	Mount Lemmon	Mount Lemmon Survey	·	1.8 km	MPC · JPL
511371	2014 FU_{63}	—	November 30, 2008	Kitt Peak	Spacewatch	·	1.1 km	MPC · JPL
511372	2014 FM_{64}	—	September 23, 2011	Kitt Peak	Spacewatch	EOS	2.0 km	MPC · JPL
511373	2014 FG_{65}	—	April 20, 2010	Mount Lemmon	Mount Lemmon Survey	·	2.2 km	MPC · JPL
511374	2014 FL_{65}	—	March 25, 2014	Mount Lemmon	Mount Lemmon Survey	BRA	1.6 km	MPC · JPL
511375	2014 FP_{67}	—	March 24, 2014	Haleakala	Pan-STARRS 1	RAF	970 m	MPC · JPL
511376	2014 FL_{73}	—	October 11, 2007	Mount Lemmon	Mount Lemmon Survey	DOR	1.9 km	MPC · JPL
511377	2014 FO_{73}	—	June 13, 2010	WISE	WISE	·	4.5 km	MPC · JPL
511378	2014 FP_{73}	—	April 21, 2006	Kitt Peak	Spacewatch	·	1.2 km	MPC · JPL
511379	2014 FR_{73}	—	March 21, 2010	Mount Lemmon	Mount Lemmon Survey	·	1.6 km	MPC · JPL
511380	2014 GJ_{6}	—	October 22, 2011	Mount Lemmon	Mount Lemmon Survey	ARM	2.9 km	MPC · JPL
511381	2014 GP_{9}	—	April 21, 2009	Mount Lemmon	Mount Lemmon Survey	·	2.3 km	MPC · JPL
511382	2014 GC_{10}	—	February 28, 2014	Haleakala	Pan-STARRS 1	·	1.5 km	MPC · JPL
511383	2014 GA_{17}	—	September 24, 2011	Haleakala	Pan-STARRS 1	JUN	1.2 km	MPC · JPL
511384	2014 GQ_{19}	—	February 19, 2009	Kitt Peak	Spacewatch	·	1.4 km	MPC · JPL
511385	2014 GS_{29}	—	April 4, 2014	Haleakala	Pan-STARRS 1	·	1.5 km	MPC · JPL
511386	2014 GA_{32}	—	November 3, 2007	Kitt Peak	Spacewatch	·	1.8 km	MPC · JPL
511387	2014 GW_{36}	—	December 30, 2008	Kitt Peak	Spacewatch	·	1.7 km	MPC · JPL
511388	2014 GX_{38}	—	September 23, 2011	Haleakala	Pan-STARRS 1	·	2.1 km	MPC · JPL
511389	2014 GQ_{40}	—	February 27, 2009	Catalina	CSS	BRA	1.8 km	MPC · JPL
511390	2014 GD_{46}	—	March 19, 2010	Mount Lemmon	Mount Lemmon Survey	·	1.2 km	MPC · JPL
511391	2014 GP_{50}	—	November 18, 2007	Kitt Peak	Spacewatch	·	1.7 km	MPC · JPL
511392	2014 GN_{53}	—	June 18, 1998	Kitt Peak	Spacewatch	·	3.3 km	MPC · JPL
511393	2014 GU_{54}	—	September 19, 2008	Kitt Peak	Spacewatch	L4	9.0 km	MPC · JPL
511394	2014 GD_{56}	—	March 7, 2003	Anderson Mesa	LONEOS	·	1.8 km	MPC · JPL
511395	2014 GG_{56}	—	January 17, 2005	Kitt Peak	Spacewatch	ADE	2.1 km	MPC · JPL
511396	2014 GN_{56}	—	December 4, 2005	Mount Lemmon	Mount Lemmon Survey	·	3.5 km	MPC · JPL
511397	2014 GO_{56}	—	August 28, 2005	Kitt Peak	Spacewatch	·	1.5 km	MPC · JPL
511398	2014 GR_{56}	—	December 4, 2007	Catalina	CSS	·	2.4 km	MPC · JPL
511399	2014 GS_{56}	—	March 20, 2010	WISE	WISE	·	1.6 km	MPC · JPL
511400	2014 HS_{5}	—	October 22, 1995	Kitt Peak	Spacewatch	EOS	1.9 km	MPC · JPL

== 511401–511500 ==
back to top

Designation			Discovery			Properties		Ref
Permanent	Provisional	Named after	Date	Site	Discoverer(s)	Category	Diam.	Ref
511401	2014 HB_{10}	—	October 23, 2011	Mount Lemmon	Mount Lemmon Survey	·	2.4 km	MPC · JPL
511402	2014 HZ_{12}	—	March 23, 2014	Kitt Peak	Spacewatch	·	1.8 km	MPC · JPL
511403	2014 HR_{19}	—	March 11, 2005	Mount Lemmon	Mount Lemmon Survey	MIS	1.9 km	MPC · JPL
511404	2014 HJ_{21}	—	April 21, 2014	Mount Lemmon	Mount Lemmon Survey	·	2.2 km	MPC · JPL
511405	2014 HE_{23}	—	October 18, 2011	Haleakala	Pan-STARRS 1	·	2.2 km	MPC · JPL
511406	2014 HZ_{27}	—	December 21, 2012	Mount Lemmon	Mount Lemmon Survey	KOR	1.3 km	MPC · JPL
511407	2014 HS_{28}	—	March 1, 2005	Kitt Peak	Spacewatch	·	1.5 km	MPC · JPL
511408	2014 HH_{30}	—	September 26, 2011	Haleakala	Pan-STARRS 1	·	1.7 km	MPC · JPL
511409	2014 HS_{47}	—	September 30, 2011	Kitt Peak	Spacewatch	·	2.4 km	MPC · JPL
511410	2014 HQ_{56}	—	January 31, 2009	Kitt Peak	Spacewatch	·	1.3 km	MPC · JPL
511411	2014 HA_{70}	—	September 26, 2006	Kitt Peak	Spacewatch	KOR	1.0 km	MPC · JPL
511412	2014 HM_{127}	—	June 6, 2010	WISE	WISE	EUP	2.6 km	MPC · JPL
511413	2014 HE_{147}	—	September 4, 2011	Haleakala	Pan-STARRS 1	·	1.5 km	MPC · JPL
511414	2014 HY_{155}	—	April 23, 2009	Mount Lemmon	Mount Lemmon Survey	·	1.5 km	MPC · JPL
511415	2014 HK_{157}	—	October 18, 2012	Haleakala	Pan-STARRS 1	·	1.6 km	MPC · JPL
511416	2014 HS_{159}	—	April 6, 2014	Kitt Peak	Spacewatch	·	2.3 km	MPC · JPL
511417	2014 HR_{161}	—	June 12, 2009	Kitt Peak	Spacewatch	·	1.7 km	MPC · JPL
511418	2014 HS_{161}	—	February 28, 2014	Haleakala	Pan-STARRS 1	·	3.9 km	MPC · JPL
511419	2014 HM_{167}	—	April 24, 2014	Haleakala	Pan-STARRS 1	·	3.0 km	MPC · JPL
511420	2014 HC_{168}	—	December 18, 2007	Mount Lemmon	Mount Lemmon Survey	·	2.1 km	MPC · JPL
511421	2014 HC_{179}	—	February 26, 2014	Mount Lemmon	Mount Lemmon Survey	·	1.6 km	MPC · JPL
511422	2014 HJ_{179}	—	January 2, 2009	Kitt Peak	Spacewatch	·	1.7 km	MPC · JPL
511423	2014 HG_{181}	—	September 24, 2011	Haleakala	Pan-STARRS 1	·	2.2 km	MPC · JPL
511424	2014 HO_{181}	—	January 10, 2013	Haleakala	Pan-STARRS 1	LIX	2.9 km	MPC · JPL
511425	2014 HC_{185}	—	September 24, 2011	Haleakala	Pan-STARRS 1	·	2.0 km	MPC · JPL
511426	2014 HD_{186}	—	October 25, 2011	Haleakala	Pan-STARRS 1	·	2.0 km	MPC · JPL
511427	2014 HN_{186}	—	December 23, 2012	Haleakala	Pan-STARRS 1	·	2.8 km	MPC · JPL
511428	2014 HM_{188}	—	April 5, 2014	Haleakala	Pan-STARRS 1	AGN	990 m	MPC · JPL
511429	2014 HR_{188}	—	March 12, 2014	Kitt Peak	Spacewatch	·	2.0 km	MPC · JPL
511430	2014 HS_{194}	—	February 28, 2014	Haleakala	Pan-STARRS 1	·	1.6 km	MPC · JPL
511431	2014 HZ_{194}	—	April 24, 2014	Haleakala	Pan-STARRS 1	·	2.7 km	MPC · JPL
511432	2014 HL_{201}	—	July 7, 2010	WISE	WISE	EUP	4.1 km	MPC · JPL
511433	2014 HQ_{202}	—	October 3, 2006	Mount Lemmon	Mount Lemmon Survey	KOR	1.1 km	MPC · JPL
511434	2014 JA	—	October 31, 2005	Catalina	CSS	·	540 m	MPC · JPL
511435	2014 JW_{4}	—	March 12, 2013	Mount Lemmon	Mount Lemmon Survey	·	2.0 km	MPC · JPL
511436	2014 JR_{10}	—	May 3, 2014	Mount Lemmon	Mount Lemmon Survey	·	1.4 km	MPC · JPL
511437	2014 JB_{14}	—	May 29, 2009	Mount Lemmon	Mount Lemmon Survey	·	1.7 km	MPC · JPL
511438	2014 JE_{14}	—	February 20, 2009	Mount Lemmon	Mount Lemmon Survey	·	1.5 km	MPC · JPL
511439	2014 JY_{23}	—	October 26, 2011	Haleakala	Pan-STARRS 1	·	2.2 km	MPC · JPL
511440	2014 JY_{25}	—	July 16, 2004	Siding Spring	SSS	H	450 m	MPC · JPL
511441	2014 JU_{26}	—	February 28, 2014	Haleakala	Pan-STARRS 1	·	2.3 km	MPC · JPL
511442	2014 JE_{27}	—	January 29, 2009	Mount Lemmon	Mount Lemmon Survey	·	1.7 km	MPC · JPL
511443	2014 JN_{27}	—	February 13, 2009	Kitt Peak	Spacewatch	·	1.9 km	MPC · JPL
511444	2014 JR_{27}	—	May 4, 2014	Haleakala	Pan-STARRS 1	URS	3.1 km	MPC · JPL
511445	2014 JJ_{29}	—	December 12, 2012	Mount Lemmon	Mount Lemmon Survey	·	1.5 km	MPC · JPL
511446	2014 JZ_{40}	—	April 25, 2014	Mount Lemmon	Mount Lemmon Survey	·	2.4 km	MPC · JPL
511447	2014 JB_{41}	—	April 30, 2014	Haleakala	Pan-STARRS 1	·	1.6 km	MPC · JPL
511448	2014 JS_{49}	—	May 8, 2014	Kitt Peak	Spacewatch	·	3.2 km	MPC · JPL
511449	2014 JX_{49}	—	February 1, 2009	Mount Lemmon	Mount Lemmon Survey	·	1.7 km	MPC · JPL
511450	2014 JN_{51}	—	February 28, 2014	Haleakala	Pan-STARRS 1	MRX	970 m	MPC · JPL
511451	2014 JE_{54}	—	May 8, 2014	Haleakala	Pan-STARRS 1	·	2.5 km	MPC · JPL
511452	2014 JO_{58}	—	January 18, 2013	Haleakala	Pan-STARRS 1	·	2.7 km	MPC · JPL
511453	2014 JZ_{68}	—	March 24, 2001	Kitt Peak	Spacewatch	·	1.2 km	MPC · JPL
511454	2014 JU_{83}	—	August 3, 2004	Siding Spring	SSS	·	2.7 km	MPC · JPL
511455	2014 JF_{84}	—	November 1, 2005	Mount Lemmon	Mount Lemmon Survey	·	2.7 km	MPC · JPL
511456	2014 KR_{15}	—	December 12, 2012	Kitt Peak	Spacewatch	·	1.8 km	MPC · JPL
511457	2014 KP_{16}	—	May 3, 2014	Kitt Peak	Spacewatch	·	1.6 km	MPC · JPL
511458	2014 KD_{17}	—	November 24, 2011	Haleakala	Pan-STARRS 1	·	2.6 km	MPC · JPL
511459	2014 KA_{18}	—	October 23, 2011	Haleakala	Pan-STARRS 1	EOS	1.9 km	MPC · JPL
511460	2014 KK_{20}	—	May 22, 2014	Kitt Peak	Spacewatch	·	2.6 km	MPC · JPL
511461	2014 KS_{30}	—	April 5, 2003	Kitt Peak	Spacewatch	·	2.5 km	MPC · JPL
511462	2014 KZ_{40}	—	February 26, 2008	Mount Lemmon	Mount Lemmon Survey	·	1.6 km	MPC · JPL
511463	2014 KC_{42}	—	April 20, 2014	Kitt Peak	Spacewatch	·	3.1 km	MPC · JPL
511464	2014 KO_{44}	—	October 25, 2011	Haleakala	Pan-STARRS 1	·	2.6 km	MPC · JPL
511465	2014 KA_{54}	—	May 5, 2014	Haleakala	Pan-STARRS 1	·	2.4 km	MPC · JPL
511466	2014 KU_{56}	—	May 7, 2014	Haleakala	Pan-STARRS 1	·	2.1 km	MPC · JPL
511467	2014 KC_{70}	—	August 22, 2004	Kitt Peak	Spacewatch	·	2.3 km	MPC · JPL
511468	2014 KX_{80}	—	November 4, 2012	Mount Lemmon	Mount Lemmon Survey	·	1.7 km	MPC · JPL
511469	2014 KH_{86}	—	December 29, 2008	Mount Lemmon	Mount Lemmon Survey	·	2.1 km	MPC · JPL
511470	2014 KN_{86}	—	February 14, 2013	Haleakala	Pan-STARRS 1	·	4.0 km	MPC · JPL
511471	2014 KU_{92}	—	January 17, 2013	Mount Lemmon	Mount Lemmon Survey	·	2.3 km	MPC · JPL
511472	2014 KP_{97}	—	February 26, 2009	Kitt Peak	Spacewatch	NEM	2.1 km	MPC · JPL
511473	2014 KY_{98}	—	June 15, 2010	WISE	WISE	EMA	2.6 km	MPC · JPL
511474	2014 KD_{100}	—	May 7, 2014	Haleakala	Pan-STARRS 1	·	2.5 km	MPC · JPL
511475	2014 KE_{101}	—	February 14, 2013	Mount Lemmon	Mount Lemmon Survey	TIR	2.6 km	MPC · JPL
511476	2014 LX_{11}	—	April 2, 2009	Kitt Peak	Spacewatch	·	1.7 km	MPC · JPL
511477	2014 LN_{20}	—	November 23, 2012	Kitt Peak	Spacewatch	·	1.4 km	MPC · JPL
511478	2014 MD_{7}	—	April 4, 2014	Haleakala	Pan-STARRS 1	·	1.8 km	MPC · JPL
511479	2014 MR_{15}	—	May 28, 2014	Haleakala	Pan-STARRS 1	·	2.5 km	MPC · JPL
511480	2014 MD_{44}	—	September 22, 2003	Kitt Peak	Spacewatch	·	2.2 km	MPC · JPL
511481	2014 MJ_{56}	—	January 26, 2012	Mount Lemmon	Mount Lemmon Survey	LIX	4.0 km	MPC · JPL
511482	2014 MU_{58}	—	January 17, 2013	Haleakala	Pan-STARRS 1	·	1.8 km	MPC · JPL
511483	2014 MC_{60}	—	January 19, 2012	Haleakala	Pan-STARRS 1	·	3.4 km	MPC · JPL
511484	2014 NE	—	February 13, 2013	Haleakala	Pan-STARRS 1	EOS	1.9 km	MPC · JPL
511485	2014 NO	—	March 12, 2008	Mount Lemmon	Mount Lemmon Survey	·	2.3 km	MPC · JPL
511486	2014 NZ	—	November 27, 2011	Mount Lemmon	Mount Lemmon Survey	·	1.6 km	MPC · JPL
511487	2014 NT_{1}	—	March 10, 2005	Catalina	CSS	JUN	1.0 km	MPC · JPL
511488	2014 NS_{16}	—	October 19, 2006	Kitt Peak	Spacewatch	·	1.8 km	MPC · JPL
511489	2014 NT_{17}	—	May 26, 2014	Haleakala	Pan-STARRS 1	·	2.8 km	MPC · JPL
511490	2014 NP_{28}	—	April 3, 2008	Mount Lemmon	Mount Lemmon Survey	·	2.3 km	MPC · JPL
511491	2014 NB_{33}	—	January 19, 2012	Kitt Peak	Spacewatch	·	2.7 km	MPC · JPL
511492	2014 NM_{63}	—	November 23, 2006	Kitt Peak	Spacewatch	H	660 m	MPC · JPL
511493	2014 NY_{63}	—	April 20, 2007	Siding Spring	SSS	·	5.4 km	MPC · JPL
511494	2014 OG_{11}	—	August 5, 2003	Kitt Peak	Spacewatch	·	3.2 km	MPC · JPL
511495	2014 OQ_{34}	—	January 28, 2007	Kitt Peak	Spacewatch	·	2.3 km	MPC · JPL
511496	2014 OU_{41}	—	March 13, 2013	Haleakala	Pan-STARRS 1	·	2.5 km	MPC · JPL
511497	2014 OV_{96}	—	December 27, 2006	Mount Lemmon	Mount Lemmon Survey	EUP	3.1 km	MPC · JPL
511498	2014 OB_{98}	—	July 10, 2014	Haleakala	Pan-STARRS 1	H	500 m	MPC · JPL
511499	2014 OC_{113}	—	December 25, 2005	Kitt Peak	Spacewatch	·	3.3 km	MPC · JPL
511500	2014 OO_{113}	—	October 12, 2010	Mount Lemmon	Mount Lemmon Survey	·	2.8 km	MPC · JPL

== 511501–511600 ==
back to top

Designation			Discovery			Properties		Ref
Permanent	Provisional	Named after	Date	Site	Discoverer(s)	Category	Diam.	Ref
511501	2014 OU_{122}	—	January 29, 2007	Kitt Peak	Spacewatch	TIR	2.5 km	MPC · JPL
511502	2014 ON_{129}	—	April 28, 2014	Haleakala	Pan-STARRS 1	LUT	4.3 km	MPC · JPL
511503	2014 OW_{157}	—	February 6, 2007	Mount Lemmon	Mount Lemmon Survey	EUP	2.4 km	MPC · JPL
511504	2014 OS_{175}	—	February 3, 2012	Mount Lemmon	Mount Lemmon Survey	·	3.5 km	MPC · JPL
511505	2014 OK_{184}	—	March 6, 2008	Catalina	CSS	·	2.7 km	MPC · JPL
511506	2014 OH_{188}	—	August 18, 2006	Kitt Peak	Spacewatch	H	470 m	MPC · JPL
511507	2014 OW_{227}	—	January 19, 2012	Mount Lemmon	Mount Lemmon Survey	LIX	3.5 km	MPC · JPL
511508	2014 OM_{239}	—	April 19, 2013	Haleakala	Pan-STARRS 1	·	3.3 km	MPC · JPL
511509	2014 OA_{338}	—	January 30, 2008	Mount Lemmon	Mount Lemmon Survey	H	390 m	MPC · JPL
511510	2014 OC_{344}	—	December 29, 2011	Mount Lemmon	Mount Lemmon Survey	EUP	3.9 km	MPC · JPL
511511	2014 OD_{344}	—	June 22, 2014	Haleakala	Pan-STARRS 1	·	800 m	MPC · JPL
511512	2014 ON_{363}	—	January 26, 2012	Mount Lemmon	Mount Lemmon Survey	·	2.3 km	MPC · JPL
511513	2014 OT_{382}	—	May 25, 2006	Kitt Peak	Spacewatch	H	410 m	MPC · JPL
511514	2014 OY_{394}	—	March 11, 2008	Mount Lemmon	Mount Lemmon Survey	H	440 m	MPC · JPL
511515	2014 PR_{4}	—	March 14, 2007	Catalina	CSS	·	3.1 km	MPC · JPL
511516	2014 PT_{58}	—	July 16, 2004	Socorro	LINEAR	H	570 m	MPC · JPL
511517	2014 PW_{67}	—	January 30, 2008	Kitt Peak	Spacewatch	H	460 m	MPC · JPL
511518	2014 QV_{33}	—	March 4, 2011	Mount Lemmon	Mount Lemmon Survey	H	360 m	MPC · JPL
511519	2014 QF_{179}	—	February 9, 2010	Catalina	CSS	H	570 m	MPC · JPL
511520	2014 QW_{296}	—	July 6, 2014	Haleakala	Pan-STARRS 1	AMO	630 m	MPC · JPL
511521	2014 QY_{371}	—	March 19, 2013	Haleakala	Pan-STARRS 1	H	420 m	MPC · JPL
511522	2014 QV_{374}	—	August 17, 2009	Kitt Peak	Spacewatch	H	530 m	MPC · JPL
511523	2014 QS_{439}	—	August 31, 2014	Haleakala	Pan-STARRS 1	AMO	470 m	MPC · JPL
511524	2014 QO_{442}	—	April 7, 2013	Mount Lemmon	Mount Lemmon Survey	H	350 m	MPC · JPL
511525	2014 QY_{442}	—	April 29, 2009	Kitt Peak	Spacewatch	L5	7.9 km	MPC · JPL
511526	2014 RF	—	June 3, 2014	Haleakala	Pan-STARRS 1	H	590 m	MPC · JPL
511527	2014 RN	—	December 11, 2004	Catalina	CSS	H	570 m	MPC · JPL
511528	2014 RO_{12}	—	November 21, 2006	Catalina	CSS	H	650 m	MPC · JPL
511529	2014 SV	—	June 26, 2011	Mount Lemmon	Mount Lemmon Survey	H	490 m	MPC · JPL
511530	2014 SN_{219}	—	December 25, 2006	Kitt Peak	Spacewatch	·	1.6 km	MPC · JPL
511531	2014 SY_{282}	—	October 17, 2008	Kitt Peak	Spacewatch	·	3.9 km	MPC · JPL
511532	2014 SP_{303}	—	December 17, 2009	Mount Lemmon	Mount Lemmon Survey	H	480 m	MPC · JPL
511533	2014 SN_{349}	—	December 3, 2015	Haleakala	Pan-STARRS 1	L5	10 km	MPC · JPL
511534	2014 SQ_{349}	—	January 13, 2016	Haleakala	Pan-STARRS 1	L5	9.9 km	MPC · JPL
511535	2014 SY_{350}	—	March 10, 2008	Mount Lemmon	Mount Lemmon Survey	H	390 m	MPC · JPL
511536	2014 TS_{9}	—	June 27, 2011	Kitt Peak	Spacewatch	H	640 m	MPC · JPL
511537	2014 TE_{18}	—	February 12, 2013	Haleakala	Pan-STARRS 1	H	500 m	MPC · JPL
511538	2014 TH_{33}	—	November 11, 2009	Mount Lemmon	Mount Lemmon Survey	H	530 m	MPC · JPL
511539	2014 TO_{33}	—	October 2, 2014	Haleakala	Pan-STARRS 1	H	390 m	MPC · JPL
511540	2014 TP_{33}	—	October 2, 2014	Haleakala	Pan-STARRS 1	H	400 m	MPC · JPL
511541	2014 TV_{33}	—	February 7, 2008	Mount Lemmon	Mount Lemmon Survey	H	430 m	MPC · JPL
511542	2014 TW_{33}	—	July 27, 2011	Siding Spring	SSS	H	580 m	MPC · JPL
511543	2014 TV_{57}	—	October 14, 2014	Catalina	CSS	H	550 m	MPC · JPL
511544	2014 TM_{58}	—	September 20, 2011	Haleakala	Pan-STARRS 1	·	1.3 km	MPC · JPL
511545	2014 TP_{59}	—	August 23, 2011	Haleakala	Pan-STARRS 1	H	490 m	MPC · JPL
511546	2014 TM_{63}	—	October 4, 2014	Mount Lemmon	Mount Lemmon Survey	H	470 m	MPC · JPL
511547	2014 UZ_{62}	—	September 28, 2006	Kitt Peak	Spacewatch	3:2	4.5 km	MPC · JPL
511548	2014 UO_{117}	—	October 26, 2009	Mount Lemmon	Mount Lemmon Survey	·	470 m	MPC · JPL
511549	2014 UV_{182}	—	April 17, 2013	Haleakala	Pan-STARRS 1	H	380 m	MPC · JPL
511550	2014 UO_{191}	—	October 5, 2014	Haleakala	Pan-STARRS 1	H	600 m	MPC · JPL
511551	2014 UD_{225}	—	October 22, 2014	Mauna Kea	OSSOS	cubewano (cold) · moon	144 km	MPC · JPL
511552	2014 UE_{225}	—	August 8, 2013	Mauna Kea	OSSOS	cubewano (cold)	177 km	MPC · JPL
511553	2014 UK_{225}	—	November 29, 2013	Mauna Kea	OSSOS	cubewano (hot)	142 km	MPC · JPL
511554	2014 UL_{225}	—	September 27, 2014	Kitt Peak	OSSOS	cubewano (hot)	126 km	MPC · JPL
511555	2014 UM_{225}	—	October 22, 2014	Mauna Kea	OSSOS	cubewano (hot)	148 km	MPC · JPL
511556	2014 VN	—	July 29, 2014	Haleakala	Pan-STARRS 1	H	560 m	MPC · JPL
511557	2014 VR_{1}	—	December 17, 2009	Mount Lemmon	Mount Lemmon Survey	H	440 m	MPC · JPL
511558	2014 VE_{2}	—	May 28, 2008	Kitt Peak	Spacewatch	H	500 m	MPC · JPL
511559	2014 VR_{11}	—	November 2, 2007	Kitt Peak	Spacewatch	·	540 m	MPC · JPL
511560	2014 VR_{22}	—	October 24, 2014	Kitt Peak	Spacewatch	·	1.4 km	MPC · JPL
511561	2014 WT_{58}	—	January 29, 2009	Mount Lemmon	Mount Lemmon Survey	·	510 m	MPC · JPL
511562	2014 WJ_{62}	—	November 19, 2003	Socorro	LINEAR	H	470 m	MPC · JPL
511563	2014 WJ_{120}	—	May 15, 2008	Catalina	CSS	H	510 m	MPC · JPL
511564	2014 WR_{215}	—	April 21, 2009	Kitt Peak	Spacewatch	L5	9.8 km	MPC · JPL
511565	2014 WY_{355}	—	November 28, 2005	Mount Lemmon	Mount Lemmon Survey	·	1.9 km	MPC · JPL
511566	2014 WR_{364}	—	December 18, 2003	Socorro	LINEAR	H	590 m	MPC · JPL
511567	2014 WZ_{369}	—	September 16, 2014	Haleakala	Pan-STARRS 1	H	490 m	MPC · JPL
511568	2014 WD_{392}	—	November 22, 2014	Haleakala	Pan-STARRS 1	L5	9.2 km	MPC · JPL
511569	2014 WY_{453}	—	December 17, 2007	Mount Lemmon	Mount Lemmon Survey	·	840 m	MPC · JPL
511570	2014 WP_{463}	—	March 31, 2008	Mount Lemmon	Mount Lemmon Survey	L5	10 km	MPC · JPL
511571	2014 WT_{468}	—	October 10, 2010	Mount Lemmon	Mount Lemmon Survey	PHO	930 m	MPC · JPL
511572	2014 WT_{479}	—	May 21, 2012	Mount Lemmon	Mount Lemmon Survey	·	2.3 km	MPC · JPL
511573	2014 WB_{480}	—	November 29, 2003	Kitt Peak	Spacewatch	·	920 m	MPC · JPL
511574	2014 WR_{494}	—	October 13, 2010	Mount Lemmon	Mount Lemmon Survey	·	840 m	MPC · JPL
511575	2014 WE_{495}	—	March 3, 2006	Catalina	CSS	(18466)	2.7 km	MPC · JPL
511576	2014 WM_{511}	—	November 24, 2003	Kitt Peak	Spacewatch	L5	8.2 km	MPC · JPL
511577	2014 XP_{3}	—	November 11, 2001	Socorro	LINEAR	H	470 m	MPC · JPL
511578	2014 XN_{8}	—	March 7, 2005	Socorro	LINEAR	H	580 m	MPC · JPL
511579	2014 XW_{8}	—	June 12, 2013	Haleakala	Pan-STARRS 1	H	460 m	MPC · JPL
511580	2014 XP_{13}	—	November 21, 2006	Catalina	CSS	H	610 m	MPC · JPL
511581	2014 XC_{17}	—	November 10, 2006	Kitt Peak	Spacewatch	H	580 m	MPC · JPL
511582	2014 XA_{40}	—	March 2, 2009	Kitt Peak	Spacewatch	L5	10 km	MPC · JPL
511583	2014 XE_{41}	—	September 20, 2011	Kitt Peak	Spacewatch	H	510 m	MPC · JPL
511584	2014 YA_{1}	—	December 26, 2006	Kitt Peak	Spacewatch	H	420 m	MPC · JPL
511585	2014 YF_{4}	—	January 19, 2005	Kitt Peak	Spacewatch	·	640 m	MPC · JPL
511586	2014 YW_{6}	—	November 21, 2006	Kitt Peak	Spacewatch	V	800 m	MPC · JPL
511587	2014 YO_{15}	—	January 26, 1996	Kitt Peak	Spacewatch	H	470 m	MPC · JPL
511588	2015 AY_{9}	—	November 19, 2007	Mount Lemmon	Mount Lemmon Survey	·	790 m	MPC · JPL
511589	2015 AK_{27}	—	August 4, 2003	Kitt Peak	Spacewatch	·	660 m	MPC · JPL
511590	2015 AV_{30}	—	March 24, 2004	Anderson Mesa	LONEOS	·	1.2 km	MPC · JPL
511591	2015 AV_{108}	—	April 25, 2006	Kitt Peak	Spacewatch	·	600 m	MPC · JPL
511592	2015 AY_{110}	—	December 21, 2014	Haleakala	Pan-STARRS 1	·	580 m	MPC · JPL
511593	2015 AY_{111}	—	August 18, 2009	Kitt Peak	Spacewatch	NYS	910 m	MPC · JPL
511594	2015 AV_{153}	—	March 10, 2007	Catalina	CSS	H	480 m	MPC · JPL
511595	2015 AX_{158}	—	November 18, 2003	Kitt Peak	Spacewatch	NYS	830 m	MPC · JPL
511596	2015 AN_{171}	—	November 2, 2010	Mount Lemmon	Mount Lemmon Survey	·	550 m	MPC · JPL
511597	2015 AN_{198}	—	January 1, 2008	Kitt Peak	Spacewatch	·	1.1 km	MPC · JPL
511598	2015 AT_{233}	—	August 25, 2004	Kitt Peak	Spacewatch	·	1.4 km	MPC · JPL
511599	2015 AL_{235}	—	November 17, 2009	Mount Lemmon	Mount Lemmon Survey	·	2.2 km	MPC · JPL
511600	2015 AZ_{245}	—	November 26, 2014	Haleakala	Pan-STARRS 1	APO +1km	1.4 km	MPC · JPL

== 511601–511700 ==
back to top

Designation			Discovery			Properties		Ref
Permanent	Provisional	Named after	Date	Site	Discoverer(s)	Category	Diam.	Ref
511601	2015 AR_{253}	—	January 14, 2015	Haleakala	Pan-STARRS 1	·	440 m	MPC · JPL
511602	2015 AM_{258}	—	January 20, 2008	Kitt Peak	Spacewatch	·	830 m	MPC · JPL
511603	2015 AJ_{280}	—	February 7, 2008	Mount Lemmon	Mount Lemmon Survey	PHO	1.7 km	MPC · JPL
511604	2015 BS_{5}	—	November 5, 2007	Kitt Peak	Spacewatch	·	740 m	MPC · JPL
511605	2015 BF_{6}	—	January 27, 2004	Kitt Peak	Spacewatch	·	740 m	MPC · JPL
511606	2015 BP_{6}	—	September 18, 2003	Kitt Peak	Spacewatch	·	2.2 km	MPC · JPL
511607	2015 BH_{8}	—	December 13, 2010	Mount Lemmon	Mount Lemmon Survey	·	1.3 km	MPC · JPL
511608	2015 BK_{21}	—	December 10, 2009	Mount Lemmon	Mount Lemmon Survey	·	1.8 km	MPC · JPL
511609	2015 BQ_{22}	—	November 10, 2010	Mount Lemmon	Mount Lemmon Survey	·	650 m	MPC · JPL
511610	2015 BB_{23}	—	September 11, 2010	Kitt Peak	Spacewatch	·	620 m	MPC · JPL
511611	2015 BW_{23}	—	September 15, 2007	Mount Lemmon	Mount Lemmon Survey	·	590 m	MPC · JPL
511612	2015 BM_{24}	—	May 9, 2006	Mount Lemmon	Mount Lemmon Survey	·	1.1 km	MPC · JPL
511613	2015 BX_{24}	—	November 11, 2009	Kitt Peak	Spacewatch	·	1.3 km	MPC · JPL
511614	2015 BB_{25}	—	March 11, 2005	Kitt Peak	Spacewatch	·	750 m	MPC · JPL
511615	2015 BD_{25}	—	March 2, 2006	Kitt Peak	Spacewatch	AGN	1.0 km	MPC · JPL
511616	2015 BT_{25}	—	September 18, 2010	Mount Lemmon	Mount Lemmon Survey	·	560 m	MPC · JPL
511617	2015 BW_{25}	—	March 10, 2008	Kitt Peak	Spacewatch	MAS	540 m	MPC · JPL
511618	2015 BF_{26}	—	October 1, 2003	Kitt Peak	Spacewatch	·	1.8 km	MPC · JPL
511619	2015 BZ_{26}	—	October 12, 2010	Mount Lemmon	Mount Lemmon Survey	·	580 m	MPC · JPL
511620	2015 BR_{32}	—	November 4, 2013	Haleakala	Pan-STARRS 1	CYB	4.3 km	MPC · JPL
511621	2015 BT_{34}	—	November 30, 2008	Mount Lemmon	Mount Lemmon Survey	·	2.7 km	MPC · JPL
511622	2015 BS_{59}	—	March 11, 2008	Kitt Peak	Spacewatch	·	1.1 km	MPC · JPL
511623	2015 BE_{72}	—	October 28, 2013	Mount Lemmon	Mount Lemmon Survey	EOS	1.8 km	MPC · JPL
511624	2015 BX_{87}	—	February 27, 2012	Haleakala	Pan-STARRS 1	·	580 m	MPC · JPL
511625	2015 BZ_{88}	—	October 2, 2008	Mount Lemmon	Mount Lemmon Survey	HOF	2.4 km	MPC · JPL
511626	2015 BG_{99}	—	July 18, 2007	Mount Lemmon	Mount Lemmon Survey	·	850 m	MPC · JPL
511627	2015 BL_{100}	—	March 6, 2011	Mount Lemmon	Mount Lemmon Survey	·	1.1 km	MPC · JPL
511628	2015 BQ_{100}	—	February 1, 2008	Kitt Peak	Spacewatch	·	780 m	MPC · JPL
511629	2015 BX_{101}	—	February 29, 2008	Kitt Peak	Spacewatch	·	880 m	MPC · JPL
511630	2015 BA_{102}	—	September 18, 2003	Kitt Peak	Spacewatch	·	2.3 km	MPC · JPL
511631	2015 BU_{102}	—	January 16, 2011	Mount Lemmon	Mount Lemmon Survey	MAS	540 m	MPC · JPL
511632	2015 BZ_{102}	—	September 22, 2008	Kitt Peak	Spacewatch	HOF	2.4 km	MPC · JPL
511633	2015 BZ_{106}	—	December 15, 2010	Mount Lemmon	Mount Lemmon Survey	·	700 m	MPC · JPL
511634	2015 BA_{107}	—	January 15, 2005	Kitt Peak	Spacewatch	BRA	1.4 km	MPC · JPL
511635	2015 BB_{118}	—	March 18, 2007	Kitt Peak	Spacewatch	·	1.5 km	MPC · JPL
511636	2015 BS_{126}	—	April 15, 2012	Haleakala	Pan-STARRS 1	·	630 m	MPC · JPL
511637	2015 BQ_{138}	—	March 29, 2008	Kitt Peak	Spacewatch	ERI	1.6 km	MPC · JPL
511638	2015 BC_{139}	—	September 11, 2010	Kitt Peak	Spacewatch	·	660 m	MPC · JPL
511639	2015 BW_{149}	—	March 4, 2012	Mount Lemmon	Mount Lemmon Survey	·	570 m	MPC · JPL
511640	2015 BX_{153}	—	December 19, 2004	Mount Lemmon	Mount Lemmon Survey	·	750 m	MPC · JPL
511641	2015 BO_{156}	—	February 9, 2008	Kitt Peak	Spacewatch	·	1.4 km	MPC · JPL
511642	2015 BJ_{195}	—	March 13, 2012	Haleakala	Pan-STARRS 1	·	740 m	MPC · JPL
511643	2015 BQ_{197}	—	October 13, 2007	Catalina	CSS	·	560 m	MPC · JPL
511644	2015 BT_{202}	—	January 17, 2015	Haleakala	Pan-STARRS 1	·	590 m	MPC · JPL
511645	2015 BW_{231}	—	March 25, 2012	Mount Lemmon	Mount Lemmon Survey	·	850 m	MPC · JPL
511646	2015 BR_{249}	—	July 14, 2009	Kitt Peak	Spacewatch	·	1.3 km	MPC · JPL
511647	2015 BM_{252}	—	December 14, 2010	Mount Lemmon	Mount Lemmon Survey	V	680 m	MPC · JPL
511648	2015 BZ_{252}	—	December 18, 2014	Haleakala	Pan-STARRS 1	·	710 m	MPC · JPL
511649	2015 BO_{258}	—	October 6, 2013	Mount Lemmon	Mount Lemmon Survey	·	710 m	MPC · JPL
511650	2015 BX_{260}	—	January 18, 2015	Haleakala	Pan-STARRS 1	·	1.1 km	MPC · JPL
511651	2015 BN_{261}	—	December 8, 2005	Kitt Peak	Spacewatch	·	1.5 km	MPC · JPL
511652	2015 BZ_{262}	—	September 1, 2010	Mount Lemmon	Mount Lemmon Survey	·	540 m	MPC · JPL
511653	2015 BP_{270}	—	January 19, 2015	Kitt Peak	Spacewatch	·	610 m	MPC · JPL
511654	2015 BC_{278}	—	April 15, 2012	Haleakala	Pan-STARRS 1	·	520 m	MPC · JPL
511655	2015 BU_{288}	—	November 8, 2009	Kitt Peak	Spacewatch	ADE	2.1 km	MPC · JPL
511656	2015 BJ_{291}	—	October 8, 2008	Mount Lemmon	Mount Lemmon Survey	·	2.3 km	MPC · JPL
511657	2015 BS_{291}	—	January 30, 2011	Mount Lemmon	Mount Lemmon Survey	MAS	670 m	MPC · JPL
511658	2015 BK_{298}	—	May 3, 2008	Mount Lemmon	Mount Lemmon Survey	ERI	1.3 km	MPC · JPL
511659	2015 BZ_{298}	—	January 11, 2008	Mount Lemmon	Mount Lemmon Survey	·	750 m	MPC · JPL
511660	2015 BK_{300}	—	October 2, 2006	Mount Lemmon	Mount Lemmon Survey	V	550 m	MPC · JPL
511661	2015 BY_{301}	—	November 10, 2013	Mount Lemmon	Mount Lemmon Survey	·	660 m	MPC · JPL
511662	2015 BJ_{302}	—	October 2, 2006	Mount Lemmon	Mount Lemmon Survey	·	790 m	MPC · JPL
511663	2015 BF_{303}	—	April 13, 2004	Kitt Peak	Spacewatch	·	1.7 km	MPC · JPL
511664	2015 BG_{304}	—	March 9, 2011	Mount Lemmon	Mount Lemmon Survey	·	1.4 km	MPC · JPL
511665	2015 BY_{316}	—	October 15, 2007	Mount Lemmon	Mount Lemmon Survey	·	600 m	MPC · JPL
511666	2015 BD_{321}	—	October 13, 2007	Mount Lemmon	Mount Lemmon Survey	·	620 m	MPC · JPL
511667	2015 BE_{327}	—	December 5, 2007	Kitt Peak	Spacewatch	·	570 m	MPC · JPL
511668	2015 BZ_{344}	—	September 12, 2010	Kitt Peak	Spacewatch	·	790 m	MPC · JPL
511669	2015 BL_{355}	—	January 22, 2006	Mount Lemmon	Mount Lemmon Survey	·	1.6 km	MPC · JPL
511670	2015 BK_{356}	—	January 26, 2001	Kitt Peak	Spacewatch	·	560 m	MPC · JPL
511671	2015 BO_{356}	—	February 7, 2002	Kitt Peak	Spacewatch	·	510 m	MPC · JPL
511672	2015 BU_{377}	—	March 17, 2009	Kitt Peak	Spacewatch	·	810 m	MPC · JPL
511673	2015 BQ_{415}	—	November 26, 2010	Mount Lemmon	Mount Lemmon Survey	·	710 m	MPC · JPL
511674	2015 BQ_{421}	—	February 9, 2005	Kitt Peak	Spacewatch	·	560 m	MPC · JPL
511675	2015 BK_{424}	—	October 8, 2008	Kitt Peak	Spacewatch	KOR	1.1 km	MPC · JPL
511676	2015 BS_{427}	—	February 27, 2012	Haleakala	Pan-STARRS 1	·	470 m	MPC · JPL
511677	2015 BG_{430}	—	January 27, 2007	Kitt Peak	Spacewatch	·	1.8 km	MPC · JPL
511678	2015 BC_{443}	—	March 15, 2007	Kitt Peak	Spacewatch	(5)	960 m	MPC · JPL
511679	2015 BY_{446}	—	September 17, 2010	Mount Lemmon	Mount Lemmon Survey	·	430 m	MPC · JPL
511680	2015 BK_{449}	—	October 19, 2010	Mount Lemmon	Mount Lemmon Survey	·	570 m	MPC · JPL
511681	2015 BG_{452}	—	October 3, 2013	Haleakala	Pan-STARRS 1	·	670 m	MPC · JPL
511682	2015 BV_{462}	—	January 20, 2015	Haleakala	Pan-STARRS 1	·	1.7 km	MPC · JPL
511683	2015 BV_{490}	—	January 27, 2012	Kitt Peak	Spacewatch	·	710 m	MPC · JPL
511684	2015 BN_{509}	—	January 22, 2015	Mount Lemmon	Mount Lemmon Survey	APO · PHA	320 m	MPC · JPL
511685	2015 BT_{510}	—	January 24, 2015	Haleakala	Pan-STARRS 1	H	490 m	MPC · JPL
511686	2015 BH_{512}	—	November 13, 2010	Mount Lemmon	Mount Lemmon Survey	·	900 m	MPC · JPL
511687	2015 BM_{513}	—	December 1, 2010	Mount Lemmon	Mount Lemmon Survey	·	1.1 km	MPC · JPL
511688	2015 BB_{515}	—	June 26, 2011	Mount Lemmon	Mount Lemmon Survey	L5	10 km	MPC · JPL
511689	2015 BQ_{519}	—	January 16, 2015	Haleakala	Pan-STARRS 1	H	480 m	MPC · JPL
511690	2015 BW_{532}	—	January 27, 2015	Haleakala	Pan-STARRS 1	PHO	970 m	MPC · JPL
511691	2015 BC_{534}	—	January 25, 2015	Haleakala	Pan-STARRS 1	·	1.7 km	MPC · JPL
511692	2015 BF_{535}	—	March 4, 2005	Mount Lemmon	Mount Lemmon Survey	·	630 m	MPC · JPL
511693	2015 BB_{537}	—	February 2, 2006	Kitt Peak	Spacewatch	·	1.7 km	MPC · JPL
511694	2015 BM_{537}	—	November 2, 2007	Catalina	CSS	·	2.6 km	MPC · JPL
511695	2015 CH	—	November 5, 2008	Siding Spring	SSS	H	790 m	MPC · JPL
511696	2015 CQ_{1}	—	January 17, 2015	Kitt Peak	Spacewatch	EUN	1.3 km	MPC · JPL
511697	2015 CG_{9}	—	March 4, 2005	Kitt Peak	Spacewatch	·	660 m	MPC · JPL
511698	2015 CN_{10}	—	April 24, 2004	Kitt Peak	Spacewatch	·	1.3 km	MPC · JPL
511699	2015 CP_{10}	—	February 16, 2001	Socorro	LINEAR	H	510 m	MPC · JPL
511700	2015 CS_{12}	—	May 20, 2007	Catalina	CSS	·	1.8 km	MPC · JPL

== 511701–511800 ==
back to top

Designation			Discovery			Properties		Ref
Permanent	Provisional	Named after	Date	Site	Discoverer(s)	Category	Diam.	Ref
511701	2015 CS_{21}	—	October 30, 2010	Mount Lemmon	Mount Lemmon Survey	·	680 m	MPC · JPL
511702	2015 CG_{24}	—	January 21, 2015	Haleakala	Pan-STARRS 1	·	2.2 km	MPC · JPL
511703	2015 CQ_{25}	—	November 26, 2014	Haleakala	Pan-STARRS 1	·	4.0 km	MPC · JPL
511704	2015 CW_{25}	—	September 4, 2008	Kitt Peak	Spacewatch	·	2.0 km	MPC · JPL
511705	2015 CO_{33}	—	January 18, 2015	Kitt Peak	Spacewatch	BRA	1.3 km	MPC · JPL
511706	2015 CE_{34}	—	March 11, 2005	Mount Lemmon	Mount Lemmon Survey	·	610 m	MPC · JPL
511707	2015 CP_{39}	—	August 27, 2006	Kitt Peak	Spacewatch	·	710 m	MPC · JPL
511708	2015 CF_{44}	—	October 9, 2013	Mount Lemmon	Mount Lemmon Survey	MAS	600 m	MPC · JPL
511709	2015 CG_{44}	—	March 28, 2012	Kitt Peak	Spacewatch	·	520 m	MPC · JPL
511710	2015 CO_{45}	—	February 4, 2005	Mount Lemmon	Mount Lemmon Survey	·	440 m	MPC · JPL
511711	2015 CF_{49}	—	February 9, 2005	Kitt Peak	Spacewatch	·	650 m	MPC · JPL
511712	2015 CG_{49}	—	September 19, 2010	Kitt Peak	Spacewatch	·	510 m	MPC · JPL
511713	2015 CA_{52}	—	December 8, 2010	Mount Lemmon	Mount Lemmon Survey	·	1.1 km	MPC · JPL
511714	2015 CC_{53}	—	January 2, 2011	Mount Lemmon	Mount Lemmon Survey	·	940 m	MPC · JPL
511715	2015 CE_{53}	—	February 28, 2008	Kitt Peak	Spacewatch	·	780 m	MPC · JPL
511716	2015 CH_{53}	—	November 27, 2013	Haleakala	Pan-STARRS 1	·	1.4 km	MPC · JPL
511717	2015 CX_{53}	—	January 13, 2011	Mount Lemmon	Mount Lemmon Survey	·	870 m	MPC · JPL
511718	2015 CX_{55}	—	October 16, 2012	Mount Lemmon	Mount Lemmon Survey	THM	2.1 km	MPC · JPL
511719	2015 CG_{58}	—	November 8, 2013	Mount Lemmon	Mount Lemmon Survey	·	4.1 km	MPC · JPL
511720	2015 CM_{58}	—	June 23, 2007	Siding Spring	SSS	·	1.8 km	MPC · JPL
511721	2015 CJ_{63}	—	October 11, 2010	Mount Lemmon	Mount Lemmon Survey	·	480 m	MPC · JPL
511722	2015 CM_{63}	—	February 24, 2012	Mount Lemmon	Mount Lemmon Survey	·	850 m	MPC · JPL
511723	2015 CP_{63}	—	March 14, 1999	Kitt Peak	Spacewatch	·	730 m	MPC · JPL
511724	2015 CP_{64}	—	January 25, 2006	Kitt Peak	Spacewatch	·	2.0 km	MPC · JPL
511725	2015 DL_{2}	—	February 10, 2008	Kitt Peak	Spacewatch	V	670 m	MPC · JPL
511726	2015 DQ_{20}	—	November 12, 2006	Mount Lemmon	Mount Lemmon Survey	·	1.1 km	MPC · JPL
511727	2015 DJ_{23}	—	January 19, 2015	Mount Lemmon	Mount Lemmon Survey	·	1.2 km	MPC · JPL
511728	2015 DS_{30}	—	December 3, 2013	Haleakala	Pan-STARRS 1	WIT	810 m	MPC · JPL
511729	2015 DB_{31}	—	January 18, 2008	Mount Lemmon	Mount Lemmon Survey	·	590 m	MPC · JPL
511730	2015 DB_{33}	—	October 2, 2006	Mount Lemmon	Mount Lemmon Survey	·	770 m	MPC · JPL
511731	2015 DZ_{33}	—	January 5, 2011	Mount Lemmon	Mount Lemmon Survey	·	1.2 km	MPC · JPL
511732	2015 DF_{36}	—	February 12, 2008	Mount Lemmon	Mount Lemmon Survey	·	700 m	MPC · JPL
511733	2015 DJ_{42}	—	January 27, 2015	Haleakala	Pan-STARRS 1	·	1.1 km	MPC · JPL
511734	2015 DP_{48}	—	November 10, 2010	Mount Lemmon	Mount Lemmon Survey	·	530 m	MPC · JPL
511735	2015 DG_{53}	—	January 21, 2015	Haleakala	Pan-STARRS 1	·	1.6 km	MPC · JPL
511736	2015 DR_{55}	—	September 17, 2006	Kitt Peak	Spacewatch	NYS	1.1 km	MPC · JPL
511737	2015 DU_{81}	—	January 27, 2015	Haleakala	Pan-STARRS 1	·	570 m	MPC · JPL
511738	2015 DM_{83}	—	January 24, 2015	Mount Lemmon	Mount Lemmon Survey	·	450 m	MPC · JPL
511739	2015 DJ_{88}	—	February 29, 2008	Kitt Peak	Spacewatch	V	570 m	MPC · JPL
511740	2015 DT_{94}	—	October 25, 2013	Mount Lemmon	Mount Lemmon Survey	·	1.7 km	MPC · JPL
511741	2015 DU_{98}	—	February 19, 2002	Kitt Peak	Spacewatch	·	1.1 km	MPC · JPL
511742	2015 DK_{118}	—	March 6, 2008	Mount Lemmon	Mount Lemmon Survey	·	660 m	MPC · JPL
511743	2015 DE_{119}	—	December 11, 2009	Mount Lemmon	Mount Lemmon Survey	·	1.4 km	MPC · JPL
511744	2015 DF_{120}	—	February 13, 2008	Mount Lemmon	Mount Lemmon Survey	V	590 m	MPC · JPL
511745	2015 DH_{120}	—	March 3, 2008	Mount Lemmon	Mount Lemmon Survey	V	600 m	MPC · JPL
511746	2015 DK_{120}	—	April 26, 2004	Socorro	LINEAR	·	4.1 km	MPC · JPL
511747	2015 DP_{120}	—	October 22, 2006	Mount Lemmon	Mount Lemmon Survey	·	1.0 km	MPC · JPL
511748	2015 DD_{121}	—	November 9, 2013	Mount Lemmon	Mount Lemmon Survey	·	710 m	MPC · JPL
511749	2015 DG_{133}	—	February 10, 2011	Catalina	CSS	PHO	1.1 km	MPC · JPL
511750	2015 DW_{134}	—	February 17, 2015	Haleakala	Pan-STARRS 1	·	1.1 km	MPC · JPL
511751	2015 DC_{138}	—	December 31, 2013	Haleakala	Pan-STARRS 1	HNS	1.2 km	MPC · JPL
511752	2015 DQ_{144}	—	September 3, 2010	Mount Lemmon	Mount Lemmon Survey	·	570 m	MPC · JPL
511753	2015 DS_{145}	—	November 29, 2014	Haleakala	Pan-STARRS 1	·	2.2 km	MPC · JPL
511754	2015 DN_{146}	—	June 13, 2008	Kitt Peak	Spacewatch	·	1.7 km	MPC · JPL
511755	2015 DC_{151}	—	November 28, 2014	Haleakala	Pan-STARRS 1	·	960 m	MPC · JPL
511756	2015 DK_{152}	—	November 10, 2010	Mount Lemmon	Mount Lemmon Survey	·	580 m	MPC · JPL
511757	2015 DA_{154}	—	January 19, 2015	Haleakala	Pan-STARRS 1	·	1.3 km	MPC · JPL
511758	2015 DF_{175}	—	October 6, 2012	Kitt Peak	Spacewatch	·	3.6 km	MPC · JPL
511759	2015 DG_{204}	—	October 25, 2013	Kitt Peak	Spacewatch	·	850 m	MPC · JPL
511760	2015 DH_{204}	—	December 30, 2007	Kitt Peak	Spacewatch	·	840 m	MPC · JPL
511761	2015 DS_{208}	—	March 23, 2004	Socorro	LINEAR	·	1.1 km	MPC · JPL
511762	2015 DC_{209}	—	June 23, 2007	Kitt Peak	Spacewatch	·	1.1 km	MPC · JPL
511763	2015 DP_{209}	—	February 16, 2015	Haleakala	Pan-STARRS 1	·	1.3 km	MPC · JPL
511764	2015 DB_{210}	—	February 14, 2002	Kitt Peak	Spacewatch	·	1.3 km	MPC · JPL
511765	2015 DC_{210}	—	November 9, 2013	Haleakala	Pan-STARRS 1	·	1.3 km	MPC · JPL
511766	2015 DZ_{210}	—	May 16, 2005	Kitt Peak	Spacewatch	·	700 m	MPC · JPL
511767	2015 DA_{212}	—	December 13, 2006	Kitt Peak	Spacewatch	·	1.3 km	MPC · JPL
511768	2015 DN_{212}	—	March 9, 2011	Mount Lemmon	Mount Lemmon Survey	·	990 m	MPC · JPL
511769	2015 DC_{213}	—	November 6, 2013	Haleakala	Pan-STARRS 1	·	560 m	MPC · JPL
511770	2015 DP_{213}	—	January 30, 2015	Haleakala	Pan-STARRS 1	T_{j} (2.93)	3.7 km	MPC · JPL
511771	2015 DZ_{216}	—	March 27, 2008	Mount Lemmon	Mount Lemmon Survey	·	700 m	MPC · JPL
511772	2015 DB_{228}	—	May 2, 2011	Catalina	CSS	HNS	1.2 km	MPC · JPL
511773	2015 DO_{228}	—	January 30, 2006	Kitt Peak	Spacewatch	·	1.6 km	MPC · JPL
511774	2015 DR_{228}	—	February 16, 2015	Haleakala	Pan-STARRS 1	·	500 m	MPC · JPL
511775	2015 DT_{229}	—	May 4, 2006	Mount Lemmon	Mount Lemmon Survey	·	2.3 km	MPC · JPL
511776	2015 DG_{230}	—	October 28, 2010	Mount Lemmon	Mount Lemmon Survey	·	700 m	MPC · JPL
511777	2015 EZ	—	March 11, 2015	Catalina	CSS	APO	190 m	MPC · JPL
511778	2015 EK_{3}	—	January 7, 2009	Kitt Peak	Spacewatch	·	2.3 km	MPC · JPL
511779	2015 EF_{4}	—	March 17, 2004	Kitt Peak	Spacewatch	·	950 m	MPC · JPL
511780	2015 EM_{8}	—	October 26, 2013	Mount Lemmon	Mount Lemmon Survey	·	1.5 km	MPC · JPL
511781	2015 EL_{12}	—	January 23, 2015	Haleakala	Pan-STARRS 1	·	790 m	MPC · JPL
511782	2015 EN_{20}	—	October 5, 2013	Haleakala	Pan-STARRS 1	·	590 m	MPC · JPL
511783	2015 EU_{20}	—	March 13, 2012	Kitt Peak	Spacewatch	·	550 m	MPC · JPL
511784	2015 EK_{21}	—	September 22, 2008	Kitt Peak	Spacewatch	·	1.7 km	MPC · JPL
511785	2015 EE_{34}	—	January 29, 2011	Mount Lemmon	Mount Lemmon Survey	MAS	660 m	MPC · JPL
511786	2015 EN_{34}	—	April 12, 2010	Kitt Peak	Spacewatch	·	2.1 km	MPC · JPL
511787	2015 EF_{63}	—	October 24, 2009	Kitt Peak	Spacewatch	·	770 m	MPC · JPL
511788	2015 EV_{64}	—	April 27, 2010	WISE	WISE	CLO	2.8 km	MPC · JPL
511789	2015 EZ_{74}	—	September 15, 2012	Catalina	CSS	·	2.5 km	MPC · JPL
511790	2015 FC_{1}	—	November 7, 2007	Kitt Peak	Spacewatch	·	790 m	MPC · JPL
511791	2015 FL_{1}	—	August 3, 2008	Siding Spring	SSS	·	1.9 km	MPC · JPL
511792	2015 FQ_{10}	—	July 15, 2004	Siding Spring	SSS	·	1.7 km	MPC · JPL
511793	2015 FQ_{12}	—	March 31, 2011	Mount Lemmon	Mount Lemmon Survey	·	1.5 km	MPC · JPL
511794	2015 FQ_{13}	—	October 18, 2012	Haleakala	Pan-STARRS 1	·	1.9 km	MPC · JPL
511795	2015 FR_{35}	—	January 22, 2015	Haleakala	Pan-STARRS 1	·	530 m	MPC · JPL
511796	2015 FM_{36}	—	March 7, 2008	Catalina	CSS	·	910 m	MPC · JPL
511797	2015 FD_{38}	—	October 8, 2012	Mount Lemmon	Mount Lemmon Survey	·	2.8 km	MPC · JPL
511798	2015 FF_{38}	—	January 12, 2010	Catalina	CSS	·	1.5 km	MPC · JPL
511799	2015 FC_{41}	—	February 14, 2015	Mount Lemmon	Mount Lemmon Survey	MAR	1.2 km	MPC · JPL
511800	2015 FK_{72}	—	February 5, 2011	Haleakala	Pan-STARRS 1	·	750 m	MPC · JPL

== 511801–511900 ==
back to top

Designation			Discovery			Properties		Ref
Permanent	Provisional	Named after	Date	Site	Discoverer(s)	Category	Diam.	Ref
511801	2015 FS_{72}	—	May 14, 2005	Kitt Peak	Spacewatch	·	600 m	MPC · JPL
511802	2015 FW_{73}	—	April 14, 2008	Mount Lemmon	Mount Lemmon Survey	·	530 m	MPC · JPL
511803	2015 FK_{75}	—	April 10, 2005	Kitt Peak	Spacewatch	·	870 m	MPC · JPL
511804	2015 FB_{76}	—	March 28, 2008	Mount Lemmon	Mount Lemmon Survey	V	510 m	MPC · JPL
511805	2015 FQ_{82}	—	August 5, 2005	Palomar	NEAT	·	1.9 km	MPC · JPL
511806	2015 FL_{107}	—	March 9, 2008	Mount Lemmon	Mount Lemmon Survey	·	680 m	MPC · JPL
511807	2015 FO_{107}	—	December 21, 2006	Kitt Peak	Spacewatch	·	1.4 km	MPC · JPL
511808	2015 FH_{120}	—	March 26, 2015	Catalina	CSS	APO	750 m	MPC · JPL
511809	2015 FG_{121}	—	May 5, 2008	Mount Lemmon	Mount Lemmon Survey	NYS	1.3 km	MPC · JPL
511810	2015 FS_{123}	—	January 30, 2008	Kitt Peak	Spacewatch	·	640 m	MPC · JPL
511811	2015 FF_{137}	—	April 1, 2011	Kitt Peak	Spacewatch	·	1.7 km	MPC · JPL
511812	2015 FH_{137}	—	March 31, 2004	Kitt Peak	Spacewatch	NYS	1.1 km	MPC · JPL
511813	2015 FD_{139}	—	April 14, 2004	Kitt Peak	Spacewatch	NYS	900 m	MPC · JPL
511814	2015 FN_{142}	—	March 28, 2008	Kitt Peak	Spacewatch	·	970 m	MPC · JPL
511815	2015 FR_{142}	—	September 25, 2006	Mount Lemmon	Mount Lemmon Survey	·	610 m	MPC · JPL
511816	2015 FU_{149}	—	March 31, 2008	Mount Lemmon	Mount Lemmon Survey	·	570 m	MPC · JPL
511817	2015 FY_{149}	—	March 9, 2011	Mount Lemmon	Mount Lemmon Survey	·	1.0 km	MPC · JPL
511818	2015 FQ_{155}	—	April 10, 2005	Mount Lemmon	Mount Lemmon Survey	·	700 m	MPC · JPL
511819	2015 FB_{158}	—	March 21, 2015	Haleakala	Pan-STARRS 1	·	620 m	MPC · JPL
511820	2015 FN_{163}	—	September 21, 2009	Kitt Peak	Spacewatch	V	560 m	MPC · JPL
511821	2015 FC_{166}	—	January 25, 2015	Haleakala	Pan-STARRS 1	·	1.0 km	MPC · JPL
511822	2015 FT_{168}	—	April 26, 2011	Mount Lemmon	Mount Lemmon Survey	·	1.5 km	MPC · JPL
511823	2015 FV_{173}	—	January 23, 2015	Haleakala	Pan-STARRS 1	·	1.1 km	MPC · JPL
511824	2015 FL_{174}	—	January 23, 2015	Haleakala	Pan-STARRS 1	·	700 m	MPC · JPL
511825	2015 FJ_{183}	—	March 12, 2008	Mount Lemmon	Mount Lemmon Survey	·	650 m	MPC · JPL
511826	2015 FS_{212}	—	October 8, 2012	Haleakala	Pan-STARRS 1	EOS	2.0 km	MPC · JPL
511827	2015 FL_{249}	—	January 14, 2011	Kitt Peak	Spacewatch	·	880 m	MPC · JPL
511828	2015 FD_{288}	—	November 29, 2014	Haleakala	Pan-STARRS 1	·	1.7 km	MPC · JPL
511829	2015 FB_{294}	—	April 24, 2006	Kitt Peak	Spacewatch	·	1.9 km	MPC · JPL
511830	2015 FR_{302}	—	February 13, 2008	Mount Lemmon	Mount Lemmon Survey	·	630 m	MPC · JPL
511831	2015 FU_{302}	—	June 27, 2011	Mount Lemmon	Mount Lemmon Survey	·	1.7 km	MPC · JPL
511832	2015 FA_{303}	—	January 24, 2014	Haleakala	Pan-STARRS 1	·	2.0 km	MPC · JPL
511833	2015 FM_{303}	—	August 21, 2012	Haleakala	Pan-STARRS 1	PHO	840 m	MPC · JPL
511834	2015 FA_{304}	—	December 30, 2013	Haleakala	Pan-STARRS 1	·	1.9 km	MPC · JPL
511835	2015 FG_{304}	—	December 30, 2013	Mount Lemmon	Mount Lemmon Survey	·	1.3 km	MPC · JPL
511836	2015 FZ_{304}	—	March 28, 2015	Haleakala	Pan-STARRS 1	·	1.5 km	MPC · JPL
511837	2015 FM_{305}	—	October 2, 2006	Mount Lemmon	Mount Lemmon Survey	·	900 m	MPC · JPL
511838	2015 FH_{312}	—	December 3, 2010	Kitt Peak	Spacewatch	·	870 m	MPC · JPL
511839	2015 FU_{317}	—	January 16, 2005	Kitt Peak	Spacewatch	·	2.2 km	MPC · JPL
511840	2015 FZ_{319}	—	May 8, 2011	Kitt Peak	Spacewatch	·	1.8 km	MPC · JPL
511841	2015 FT_{323}	—	November 26, 2013	Haleakala	Pan-STARRS 1	·	690 m	MPC · JPL
511842	2015 FX_{324}	—	February 10, 2007	Mount Lemmon	Mount Lemmon Survey	·	1.1 km	MPC · JPL
511843	2015 FC_{326}	—	October 28, 2013	Mount Lemmon	Mount Lemmon Survey	·	660 m	MPC · JPL
511844	2015 FH_{326}	—	February 7, 2008	Mount Lemmon	Mount Lemmon Survey	·	650 m	MPC · JPL
511845	2015 FA_{330}	—	March 25, 2015	Haleakala	Pan-STARRS 1	HNS	1.0 km	MPC · JPL
511846	2015 FZ_{332}	—	April 2, 2011	Haleakala	Pan-STARRS 1	PHO	1.2 km	MPC · JPL
511847	2015 FR_{334}	—	March 24, 2015	Mount Lemmon	Mount Lemmon Survey	·	1.4 km	MPC · JPL
511848	2015 FD_{335}	—	December 27, 2005	Kitt Peak	Spacewatch	·	1.4 km	MPC · JPL
511849	2015 FW_{335}	—	November 4, 2005	Kitt Peak	Spacewatch	NYS	1.1 km	MPC · JPL
511850	2015 FB_{336}	—	March 30, 2015	Haleakala	Pan-STARRS 1	·	1.9 km	MPC · JPL
511851	2015 FZ_{336}	—	June 3, 2011	Mount Lemmon	Mount Lemmon Survey	·	1.1 km	MPC · JPL
511852	2015 FK_{340}	—	December 11, 2013	Haleakala	Pan-STARRS 1	·	1.8 km	MPC · JPL
511853	2015 FV_{340}	—	March 31, 2015	Haleakala	Pan-STARRS 1	EUN	1.4 km	MPC · JPL
511854	2015 FE_{347}	—	December 24, 2013	Mount Lemmon	Mount Lemmon Survey	·	3.4 km	MPC · JPL
511855	2015 FV_{347}	—	November 2, 2008	Mount Lemmon	Mount Lemmon Survey	·	2.1 km	MPC · JPL
511856	2015 FO_{354}	—	October 30, 2011	Mount Lemmon	Mount Lemmon Survey	·	2.8 km	MPC · JPL
511857	2015 FK_{363}	—	March 16, 2012	Haleakala	Pan-STARRS 1	·	570 m	MPC · JPL
511858	2015 FW_{390}	—	October 3, 2006	Mount Lemmon	Mount Lemmon Survey	(2076)	660 m	MPC · JPL
511859	2015 FA_{397}	—	December 18, 2009	Mount Lemmon	Mount Lemmon Survey	·	1.4 km	MPC · JPL
511860	2015 FB_{397}	—	February 17, 2007	Mount Lemmon	Mount Lemmon Survey	V	650 m	MPC · JPL
511861	2015 GT_{1}	—	January 17, 2015	Kitt Peak	Spacewatch	·	1.1 km	MPC · JPL
511862	2015 GY_{4}	—	March 14, 2011	Mount Lemmon	Mount Lemmon Survey	·	1.5 km	MPC · JPL
511863	2015 GS_{14}	—	May 3, 2011	Mount Lemmon	Mount Lemmon Survey	·	1.1 km	MPC · JPL
511864	2015 GJ_{16}	—	September 14, 2012	Catalina	CSS	·	970 m	MPC · JPL
511865	2015 GE_{20}	—	March 4, 2008	Mount Lemmon	Mount Lemmon Survey	BAP	680 m	MPC · JPL
511866	2015 GU_{22}	—	April 12, 2015	Haleakala	Pan-STARRS 1	·	1.6 km	MPC · JPL
511867	2015 GY_{22}	—	February 2, 2006	Kitt Peak	Spacewatch	EUN	960 m	MPC · JPL
511868	2015 GN_{23}	—	January 26, 2006	Mount Lemmon	Mount Lemmon Survey	EUN	1.1 km	MPC · JPL
511869	2015 GP_{24}	—	November 26, 2009	Kitt Peak	Spacewatch	·	1.5 km	MPC · JPL
511870	2015 GS_{27}	—	March 11, 2011	Kitt Peak	Spacewatch	NYS	1.0 km	MPC · JPL
511871	2015 GM_{28}	—	June 12, 2005	Kitt Peak	Spacewatch	·	630 m	MPC · JPL
511872	2015 GQ_{28}	—	January 28, 2011	Mount Lemmon	Mount Lemmon Survey	·	880 m	MPC · JPL
511873	2015 GF_{29}	—	April 19, 2004	Kitt Peak	Spacewatch	·	900 m	MPC · JPL
511874	2015 GP_{29}	—	October 1, 2005	Mount Lemmon	Mount Lemmon Survey	·	1.0 km	MPC · JPL
511875	2015 GK_{31}	—	October 27, 2006	Mount Lemmon	Mount Lemmon Survey	·	760 m	MPC · JPL
511876	2015 GT_{33}	—	March 22, 2015	Haleakala	Pan-STARRS 1	·	1.2 km	MPC · JPL
511877	2015 GB_{35}	—	September 28, 2013	Mount Lemmon	Mount Lemmon Survey	NYS	1.1 km	MPC · JPL
511878	2015 GQ_{35}	—	December 31, 2007	Mount Lemmon	Mount Lemmon Survey	·	500 m	MPC · JPL
511879	2015 GP_{38}	—	September 16, 2009	Catalina	CSS	V	730 m	MPC · JPL
511880	2015 GJ_{39}	—	March 25, 2015	Haleakala	Pan-STARRS 1	·	1.1 km	MPC · JPL
511881	2015 GR_{39}	—	April 5, 2008	Mount Lemmon	Mount Lemmon Survey	·	730 m	MPC · JPL
511882	2015 GV_{42}	—	November 6, 2010	Mount Lemmon	Mount Lemmon Survey	·	570 m	MPC · JPL
511883	2015 GG_{43}	—	October 13, 2013	Mount Lemmon	Mount Lemmon Survey	·	770 m	MPC · JPL
511884	2015 GW_{44}	—	December 14, 2010	Kitt Peak	Spacewatch	·	720 m	MPC · JPL
511885	2015 GM_{45}	—	October 10, 2012	Haleakala	Pan-STARRS 1	·	1.5 km	MPC · JPL
511886	2015 GP_{45}	—	October 8, 2012	Haleakala	Pan-STARRS 1	·	1.9 km	MPC · JPL
511887	2015 GV_{45}	—	September 20, 2011	Kitt Peak	Spacewatch	TIR	2.6 km	MPC · JPL
511888	2015 GK_{51}	—	September 24, 2008	Catalina	CSS	·	2.1 km	MPC · JPL
511889	2015 HT_{6}	—	October 9, 2008	Mount Lemmon	Mount Lemmon Survey	·	1.4 km	MPC · JPL
511890	2015 HF_{7}	—	January 1, 2014	Haleakala	Pan-STARRS 1	·	1.3 km	MPC · JPL
511891	2015 HN_{8}	—	May 2, 2008	Kitt Peak	Spacewatch	·	1.1 km	MPC · JPL
511892	2015 HL_{14}	—	May 14, 2008	Mount Lemmon	Mount Lemmon Survey	·	940 m	MPC · JPL
511893	2015 HJ_{15}	—	September 21, 2009	Kitt Peak	Spacewatch	·	1.3 km	MPC · JPL
511894	2015 HN_{15}	—	May 23, 2003	Kitt Peak	Spacewatch	·	1.1 km	MPC · JPL
511895	2015 HP_{15}	—	March 5, 2006	Kitt Peak	Spacewatch	EUN	1.1 km	MPC · JPL
511896	2015 HV_{15}	—	April 10, 2005	Mount Lemmon	Mount Lemmon Survey	·	740 m	MPC · JPL
511897	2015 HG_{26}	—	October 20, 2007	Mount Lemmon	Mount Lemmon Survey	·	1.6 km	MPC · JPL
511898	2015 HV_{27}	—	November 16, 2003	Apache Point	SDSS	·	2.2 km	MPC · JPL
511899	2015 HK_{28}	—	January 28, 2015	Haleakala	Pan-STARRS 1	·	1.3 km	MPC · JPL
511900	2015 HE_{30}	—	September 28, 2011	Kitt Peak	Spacewatch	TIR	2.4 km	MPC · JPL

== 511901–512000 ==
back to top

Designation			Discovery			Properties		Ref
Permanent	Provisional	Named after	Date	Site	Discoverer(s)	Category	Diam.	Ref
511901	2015 HE_{34}	—	January 17, 2007	Kitt Peak	Spacewatch	NYS	1.1 km	MPC · JPL
511902	2015 HH_{39}	—	March 15, 2008	Mount Lemmon	Mount Lemmon Survey	·	940 m	MPC · JPL
511903	2015 HK_{42}	—	April 8, 2010	WISE	WISE	T_{j} (2.99)	4.9 km	MPC · JPL
511904	2015 HS_{60}	—	June 21, 2007	Mount Lemmon	Mount Lemmon Survey	EUN	1.3 km	MPC · JPL
511905	2015 HG_{62}	—	October 29, 2005	Kitt Peak	Spacewatch	V	750 m	MPC · JPL
511906	2015 HA_{65}	—	January 27, 2007	Mount Lemmon	Mount Lemmon Survey	NYS	920 m	MPC · JPL
511907	2015 HJ_{66}	—	February 8, 2007	Mount Lemmon	Mount Lemmon Survey	NYS	1.4 km	MPC · JPL
511908	2015 HU_{67}	—	October 11, 1999	Kitt Peak	Spacewatch	·	1.0 km	MPC · JPL
511909	2015 HQ_{73}	—	March 9, 2007	Mount Lemmon	Mount Lemmon Survey	·	1.0 km	MPC · JPL
511910	2015 HV_{79}	—	November 2, 2013	Mount Lemmon	Mount Lemmon Survey	(5)	970 m	MPC · JPL
511911	2015 HX_{85}	—	April 20, 2007	Kitt Peak	Spacewatch	·	760 m	MPC · JPL
511912	2015 HR_{87}	—	November 12, 2012	Mount Lemmon	Mount Lemmon Survey	·	2.2 km	MPC · JPL
511913	2015 HA_{88}	—	March 19, 2015	Haleakala	Pan-STARRS 1	·	1.5 km	MPC · JPL
511914	2015 HW_{92}	—	April 19, 2004	Socorro	LINEAR	·	1.2 km	MPC · JPL
511915	2015 HM_{94}	—	April 21, 2006	Kitt Peak	Spacewatch	·	2.0 km	MPC · JPL
511916	2015 HR_{94}	—	October 6, 2008	Mount Lemmon	Mount Lemmon Survey	·	1.4 km	MPC · JPL
511917	2015 HD_{95}	—	November 2, 2013	Mount Lemmon	Mount Lemmon Survey	·	1.2 km	MPC · JPL
511918	2015 HO_{96}	—	March 14, 2007	Kitt Peak	Spacewatch	·	1.4 km	MPC · JPL
511919	2015 HD_{100}	—	September 30, 2008	La Sagra	OAM	·	1.1 km	MPC · JPL
511920	2015 HK_{110}	—	March 25, 2015	Haleakala	Pan-STARRS 1	·	2.2 km	MPC · JPL
511921	2015 HZ_{110}	—	August 23, 2007	Kitt Peak	Spacewatch	·	2.0 km	MPC · JPL
511922	2015 HT_{123}	—	March 15, 2004	Kitt Peak	Spacewatch	·	660 m	MPC · JPL
511923	2015 HM_{134}	—	September 29, 2011	Kitt Peak	Spacewatch	THM	2.1 km	MPC · JPL
511924	2015 HK_{141}	—	September 5, 2008	Kitt Peak	Spacewatch	·	830 m	MPC · JPL
511925	2015 HU_{150}	—	February 24, 2014	Haleakala	Pan-STARRS 1	·	3.1 km	MPC · JPL
511926	2015 HG_{152}	—	April 14, 2008	Mount Lemmon	Mount Lemmon Survey	·	690 m	MPC · JPL
511927	2015 HM_{152}	—	November 21, 2008	Mount Lemmon	Mount Lemmon Survey	·	1.4 km	MPC · JPL
511928	2015 HG_{155}	—	February 7, 2007	Mount Lemmon	Mount Lemmon Survey	·	1.3 km	MPC · JPL
511929	2015 HG_{161}	—	December 9, 2006	Kitt Peak	Spacewatch	·	960 m	MPC · JPL
511930	2015 HD_{164}	—	October 7, 2008	Mount Lemmon	Mount Lemmon Survey	·	1.0 km	MPC · JPL
511931	2015 HH_{164}	—	December 2, 2008	Kitt Peak	Spacewatch	·	2.0 km	MPC · JPL
511932	2015 HB_{166}	—	February 25, 2015	Haleakala	Pan-STARRS 1	·	1.3 km	MPC · JPL
511933	2015 HT_{166}	—	April 24, 2015	Haleakala	Pan-STARRS 1	MAR	940 m	MPC · JPL
511934	2015 HA_{167}	—	March 26, 2011	Mount Lemmon	Mount Lemmon Survey	·	1.2 km	MPC · JPL
511935	2015 HE_{169}	—	February 8, 2011	Mount Lemmon	Mount Lemmon Survey	·	780 m	MPC · JPL
511936	2015 HQ_{169}	—	October 1, 2003	Kitt Peak	Spacewatch	·	690 m	MPC · JPL
511937	2015 HS_{170}	—	November 27, 2006	Mount Lemmon	Mount Lemmon Survey	T_{j} (2.98)	4.2 km	MPC · JPL
511938	2015 HT_{170}	—	May 28, 2000	Socorro	LINEAR	·	1.2 km	MPC · JPL
511939	2015 HE_{172}	—	March 16, 2004	Siding Spring	SSS	·	1.6 km	MPC · JPL
511940	2015 HH_{172}	—	February 9, 2005	Mount Lemmon	Mount Lemmon Survey	·	710 m	MPC · JPL
511941	2015 HE_{173}	—	April 12, 2004	Kitt Peak	Spacewatch	·	1.3 km	MPC · JPL
511942	2015 HQ_{173}	—	February 11, 2004	Kitt Peak	Spacewatch	·	770 m	MPC · JPL
511943	2015 HX_{173}	—	June 3, 2008	Mount Lemmon	Mount Lemmon Survey	V	770 m	MPC · JPL
511944	2015 HG_{174}	—	April 4, 2015	Haleakala	Pan-STARRS 1	·	1.6 km	MPC · JPL
511945	2015 HD_{175}	—	October 24, 2005	Kitt Peak	Spacewatch	·	1.4 km	MPC · JPL
511946	2015 HH_{185}	—	March 18, 2010	Mount Lemmon	Mount Lemmon Survey	·	2.3 km	MPC · JPL
511947	2015 HJ_{185}	—	October 15, 2004	Mount Lemmon	Mount Lemmon Survey	·	1.1 km	MPC · JPL
511948	2015 HN_{185}	—	October 28, 2005	Mount Lemmon	Mount Lemmon Survey	·	1.2 km	MPC · JPL
511949	2015 HO_{185}	—	November 28, 2013	Mount Lemmon	Mount Lemmon Survey	·	990 m	MPC · JPL
511950	2015 JW_{5}	—	February 25, 2006	Kitt Peak	Spacewatch	·	1.4 km	MPC · JPL
511951	2015 JB_{11}	—	February 14, 2010	Mount Lemmon	Mount Lemmon Survey	·	1.6 km	MPC · JPL
511952	2015 JV_{12}	—	April 4, 2010	Kitt Peak	Spacewatch	·	1.7 km	MPC · JPL
511953	2015 KB_{1}	—	November 11, 2004	Kitt Peak	Spacewatch	MAR	1.4 km	MPC · JPL
511954	2015 KD_{1}	—	January 20, 2015	Haleakala	Pan-STARRS 1	·	750 m	MPC · JPL
511955	2015 KC_{2}	—	September 6, 2012	Mount Lemmon	Mount Lemmon Survey	·	1.4 km	MPC · JPL
511956	2015 KG_{3}	—	April 4, 2005	Kitt Peak	Spacewatch	·	680 m	MPC · JPL
511957	2015 KQ_{7}	—	October 13, 2006	Kitt Peak	Spacewatch	·	810 m	MPC · JPL
511958	2015 KC_{9}	—	June 10, 2011	Mount Lemmon	Mount Lemmon Survey	MAR	1.0 km	MPC · JPL
511959	2015 KU_{9}	—	April 29, 2011	Mount Lemmon	Mount Lemmon Survey	·	1.8 km	MPC · JPL
511960	2015 KW_{9}	—	May 18, 2015	Haleakala	Pan-STARRS 1	·	1.8 km	MPC · JPL
511961	2015 KK_{12}	—	January 28, 2014	Catalina	CSS	·	2.3 km	MPC · JPL
511962	2015 KB_{13}	—	May 25, 2006	Kitt Peak	Spacewatch	·	1.4 km	MPC · JPL
511963	2015 KD_{14}	—	May 20, 2006	Mount Lemmon	Mount Lemmon Survey	·	1.6 km	MPC · JPL
511964	2015 KW_{14}	—	June 15, 2005	Kitt Peak	Spacewatch	·	2.2 km	MPC · JPL
511965	2015 KN_{17}	—	May 16, 2010	WISE	WISE	·	2.4 km	MPC · JPL
511966	2015 KY_{17}	—	March 30, 2015	Haleakala	Pan-STARRS 1	GEF	1.2 km	MPC · JPL
511967	2015 KC_{24}	—	October 25, 2003	Kitt Peak	Spacewatch	PAD	2.0 km	MPC · JPL
511968	2015 KU_{26}	—	October 20, 2012	Haleakala	Pan-STARRS 1	·	2.4 km	MPC · JPL
511969	2015 KF_{38}	—	November 17, 2006	Mount Lemmon	Mount Lemmon Survey	·	3.4 km	MPC · JPL
511970	2015 KY_{40}	—	November 27, 2012	Mount Lemmon	Mount Lemmon Survey	·	2.3 km	MPC · JPL
511971	2015 KE_{42}	—	October 8, 2012	Mount Lemmon	Mount Lemmon Survey	·	1.0 km	MPC · JPL
511972	2015 KY_{43}	—	April 13, 2004	Kitt Peak	Spacewatch	MAS	600 m	MPC · JPL
511973	2015 KO_{47}	—	December 22, 2008	Mount Lemmon	Mount Lemmon Survey	·	3.2 km	MPC · JPL
511974	2015 KY_{51}	—	June 22, 2011	Mount Lemmon	Mount Lemmon Survey	·	1.1 km	MPC · JPL
511975	2015 KH_{58}	—	May 21, 2010	WISE	WISE	·	3.5 km	MPC · JPL
511976	2015 KN_{58}	—	August 27, 2005	Palomar	NEAT	·	1.2 km	MPC · JPL
511977	2015 KW_{60}	—	March 29, 2011	Mount Lemmon	Mount Lemmon Survey	MAS	690 m	MPC · JPL
511978	2015 KY_{64}	—	May 1, 2011	Haleakala	Pan-STARRS 1	·	860 m	MPC · JPL
511979	2015 KS_{67}	—	June 6, 2011	Haleakala	Pan-STARRS 1	·	1.1 km	MPC · JPL
511980	2015 KE_{75}	—	November 2, 1999	Kitt Peak	Spacewatch	fast	1.5 km	MPC · JPL
511981	2015 KK_{75}	—	February 4, 2005	Kitt Peak	Spacewatch	·	1.7 km	MPC · JPL
511982	2015 KO_{82}	—	December 18, 2003	Socorro	LINEAR	·	2.9 km	MPC · JPL
511983	2015 KO_{86}	—	December 4, 2013	Haleakala	Pan-STARRS 1	·	1.5 km	MPC · JPL
511984	2015 KJ_{88}	—	May 9, 2010	WISE	WISE	·	3.0 km	MPC · JPL
511985	2015 KZ_{92}	—	June 30, 2011	Haleakala	Pan-STARRS 1	·	2.0 km	MPC · JPL
511986	2015 KV_{93}	—	February 23, 2007	Catalina	CSS	PHO	760 m	MPC · JPL
511987	2015 KD_{94}	—	November 12, 2012	Haleakala	Pan-STARRS 1	MAR	1.1 km	MPC · JPL
511988	2015 KC_{102}	—	June 3, 2011	Mount Lemmon	Mount Lemmon Survey	MAR	810 m	MPC · JPL
511989	2015 KN_{104}	—	March 31, 2015	Haleakala	Pan-STARRS 1	·	2.5 km	MPC · JPL
511990	2015 KL_{123}	—	February 21, 2007	Kitt Peak	Spacewatch	V	680 m	MPC · JPL
511991	2015 KE_{125}	—	March 17, 2004	Kitt Peak	Spacewatch	·	730 m	MPC · JPL
511992	2015 KS_{125}	—	December 18, 2007	Mount Lemmon	Mount Lemmon Survey	·	590 m	MPC · JPL
511993	2015 KK_{128}	—	November 18, 2006	Kitt Peak	Spacewatch	V	680 m	MPC · JPL
511994	2015 KZ_{128}	—	December 8, 2012	Mount Lemmon	Mount Lemmon Survey	GEF	1.4 km	MPC · JPL
511995	2015 KE_{129}	—	October 29, 2005	Kitt Peak	Spacewatch	·	1.1 km	MPC · JPL
511996	2015 KV_{129}	—	April 2, 2011	Kitt Peak	Spacewatch	·	1.1 km	MPC · JPL
511997	2015 KR_{130}	—	November 8, 2013	Mount Lemmon	Mount Lemmon Survey	EUN	1.2 km	MPC · JPL
511998	2015 KT_{133}	—	April 11, 2015	Kitt Peak	Spacewatch	BRA	1.5 km	MPC · JPL
511999	2015 KD_{146}	—	November 17, 2006	Mount Lemmon	Mount Lemmon Survey	·	1.1 km	MPC · JPL
512000	2015 KJ_{146}	—	January 26, 2014	Haleakala	Pan-STARRS 1	·	1.9 km	MPC · JPL

back to top

== Meaning of names ==
As minor planet discoveries are confirmed, they are given a permanent number by the IAU's Minor Planet Center (MPC), and the discoverers can then submit names for them, following the IAU's naming conventions. The list below concerns those minor planets in the specified number-range that have received names, and explains the meanings of those names.

Official naming citations of newly named small Solar System bodies are approved and published in a bulletin by IAU's Working Group for Small Bodies Nomenclature (WGSBN). Before May 2021, citations were published in MPC's Minor Planet Circulars for many decades. Recent citations can also be found on the JPL Small-Body Database (SBDB). Until his death in 2016, German astronomer Lutz D. Schmadel compiled these citations into the Dictionary of Minor Planet Names (DMP) and regularly updated the collection.

Based on Paul Herget's The Names of the Minor Planets, Schmadel also researched the unclear origin of numerous asteroids, most of which had been named prior to World War II. This article incorporates text from this source, which is in the public domain: SBDB New namings may only be added to this list below after official publication as the preannouncement of names is condemned. The WGSBN publishes a comprehensive guideline for the naming rules of non-cometary small Solar System bodies.

Named minor planet	Provisional	This minor planet was named for...	Ref · Catalog
511238 Cuixiangqun	2014 BK_{17}	Cui Xiangqun (b. 1951) is a Chinese designer and constructor of large astronomical telescopes.	IAU · 511238
