= (511002) 2013 MZ5 =

Sub-kilometer asteroid

(511002) 2013 MZ_{5}
- 2013 MZ_{5} imaged by the Pan-STARRS survey in June 2013

Discovery
- Discovered by: Pan-STARRS 1
- Discovery site: Haleakala Obs.
- Discovery date: 18 June 2013

Designations
- Minor planet category: NEO · Amor

Orbital characteristics
- Epoch 27 April 2019 (JD 2458600.5)
- Uncertainty parameter 1
- Observation arc: 4.55 yr (1,662 d)
- Aphelion: 1.8267 AU
- Perihelion: 1.2785 AU
- Semi-major axis: 1.5526 AU
- Eccentricity: 0.1766
- Orbital period (sidereal): 1.93 yr (707 d)
- Mean anomaly: 299.77°
- Mean motion: 0° 30^{m} 34.2^{s} / day
- Inclination: 29.148°
- Longitude of ascending node: 93.507°
- Argument of perihelion: 274.17°
- Earth MOID: 0.4613 AU (180 LD)

Physical characteristics
- Mean diameter: 300 m (est. at 0.18)
- Absolute magnitude (H): 20.1

(511002) 2013 MZ_{5} is a sub-kilometer asteroid, classified as a near-Earth object of the Amor group, estimated to measure approximately 300 meters (1,000 feet) in diameter. It was discovered on 18 June 2013, by astronomers with the Pan-STARRS survey at Haleakala Observatory on the island of Maui, Hawaii, in the United States. It was the 10,000th near-Earth object ever discovered.

== Orbit and classification ==
2013 MZ_{5} is an Amor asteroid – a subgroup of near-Earth asteroids that approach the orbit of Earth from beyond, but do not cross it. It orbits the Sun at a distance of 1.3–1.8 AU once every 23 months (707 days; semi-major axis of 1.55 AU). Its orbit has an eccentricity of 0.18 and an inclination of 29° with respect to the ecliptic. The body's observation arc begins with its official discovery observation at Haleakala in June 2013.

=== Close approaches ===
The asteroid has an Earth minimum orbital intersection distance of 69,000,000 km (0.4613 AU), which translates into 180 lunar distances. It also makes close approaches to Mars. On 28 August 2125, it is projected to pass the Red Planet at a nominal distance of 13,600,000 km (0.0910 AU). With an aphelion of 1.83 AU, it is also a Mars-crossing asteroid.

== 10,000th discovered NEO ==
2013 MZ_{5} was the 10,000th near-Earth object (NEO) ever discovered in June 2013 and considered a significant milestone in exploring the NEO population.

== Numbering and naming ==
This minor planet was numbered by the Minor Planet Center on 31 January 2018 and received the number 511002 in the minor planet catalog (M.P.C. 108621). As of 2019, it has not been named.

== Physical characteristics ==
=== Diameter and albedo ===
2013 MZ_{5} measures approximately 300 meters in diameter for an absolute magnitude of 20.1 and an assumed albedo 0.18, which is typical value for stony asteroids. A generic magnitude-to-diameter conversion on a wider range of possible albedos (0.30 to 0.05) gives a diameter between 230 and 570 meters. As of 2019, no rotational lightcurve of 2013 MZ_{5} has been obtained from photometric observations. The object's effective size, rotation period, pole and shape remain unknown.
