= List of minor planets: 581001–582000 =

The following is a partial list of minor planets, running from minor-planet number 581001 through 582000, inclusive. The primary data for this and other partial lists is based on JPL's "Small-Body Orbital Elements" and data available from the Minor Planet Center. Critical list information is also provided by the MPC, unless otherwise specified from Lowell Observatory. A detailed description of the table's columns and additional sources are given on the main page including a complete list of every page in this series, and a statistical break-up on the dynamical classification of minor planets.

Also see the summary list of all named bodies in numerical and alphabetical order, and the corresponding naming citations for the number range of this particular list. New namings may only be added to this list after official publication, as the preannouncement of names is condemned by the Working Group for Small Bodies Nomenclature of the International Astronomical Union.

Near-Earth obj.	MBA (inner)	MBA (outer)	Centaur
Mars-crosser	MBA (middle)	Jupiter trojan	Trans-Neptunian obj.
Unclassified

== 581001–581100 ==
Designation			Discovery			Properties		Ref
Permanent	Provisional	Named after	Date	Site	Discoverer(s)	Category	Diam.	Ref
581001	2015 FK_{7}	—	January 22, 2015	Haleakala	Pan-STARRS 1	·	1.5 km	MPC · JPL
581002	2015 FN_{7}	—	December 30, 2014	Haleakala	Pan-STARRS 1	H	510 m	MPC · JPL
581003	2015 FP_{7}	—	December 17, 2009	Mount Lemmon	Mount Lemmon Survey	·	1.8 km	MPC · JPL
581004	2015 FY_{7}	—	January 9, 2006	Kitt Peak	Spacewatch	·	1.7 km	MPC · JPL
581005	2015 FA_{8}	—	April 28, 2001	Kitt Peak	Spacewatch	MAS	590 m	MPC · JPL
581006	2015 FQ_{9}	—	March 16, 2015	Haleakala	Pan-STARRS 1	·	1.7 km	MPC · JPL
581007	2015 FM_{12}	—	January 26, 2001	Kitt Peak	Spacewatch	·	1.6 km	MPC · JPL
581008	2015 FA_{13}	—	December 31, 2008	Kitt Peak	Spacewatch	EOS	1.4 km	MPC · JPL
581009	2015 FL_{13}	—	March 16, 2015	Haleakala	Pan-STARRS 1	·	1.9 km	MPC · JPL
581010	2015 FK_{14}	—	March 16, 2015	Haleakala	Pan-STARRS 1	PHO	590 m	MPC · JPL
581011	2015 FD_{15}	—	February 18, 2015	Haleakala	Pan-STARRS 1	·	1.7 km	MPC · JPL
581012	2015 FN_{16}	—	February 18, 2015	Haleakala	Pan-STARRS 1	·	1.7 km	MPC · JPL
581013	2015 FM_{17}	—	December 1, 2013	Črni Vrh	Vales, J.	·	2.3 km	MPC · JPL
581014	2015 FZ_{17}	—	February 6, 2010	Mount Lemmon	Mount Lemmon Survey	·	2.2 km	MPC · JPL
581015	2015 FH_{18}	—	December 28, 2013	Kitt Peak	Spacewatch	EOS	1.5 km	MPC · JPL
581016	2015 FJ_{18}	—	March 16, 2015	Haleakala	Pan-STARRS 1	·	1.9 km	MPC · JPL
581017	2015 FR_{19}	—	March 16, 2015	Haleakala	Pan-STARRS 1	·	1.9 km	MPC · JPL
581018	2015 FP_{20}	—	March 19, 2004	Palomar	NEAT	H	410 m	MPC · JPL
581019	2015 FT_{24}	—	February 27, 2015	Mount Lemmon	Mount Lemmon Survey	EUN	1.3 km	MPC · JPL
581020	2015 FL_{25}	—	March 16, 2015	Haleakala	Pan-STARRS 1	·	1.6 km	MPC · JPL
581021	2015 FX_{27}	—	September 28, 2003	Anderson Mesa	LONEOS	·	2.2 km	MPC · JPL
581022	2015 FS_{30}	—	January 17, 2015	Haleakala	Pan-STARRS 1	·	1.5 km	MPC · JPL
581023	2015 FX_{34}	—	October 21, 2011	Catalina	CSS	H	550 m	MPC · JPL
581024	2015 FR_{36}	—	March 22, 2015	Haleakala	Pan-STARRS 1	H	440 m	MPC · JPL
581025	2015 FX_{37}	—	December 20, 2004	Mount Lemmon	Mount Lemmon Survey	·	2.5 km	MPC · JPL
581026	2015 FZ_{37}	—	April 15, 2011	Haleakala	Pan-STARRS 1	·	820 m	MPC · JPL
581027	2015 FV_{38}	—	March 17, 2015	Haleakala	Pan-STARRS 1	KOR	1.2 km	MPC · JPL
581028	2015 FB_{40}	—	September 19, 2008	Kitt Peak	Spacewatch	·	950 m	MPC · JPL
581029	2015 FZ_{40}	—	November 27, 2013	Haleakala	Pan-STARRS 1	·	1.1 km	MPC · JPL
581030	2015 FH_{41}	—	October 3, 2013	Kitt Peak	Spacewatch	·	2.2 km	MPC · JPL
581031	2015 FK_{41}	—	February 19, 2012	Catalina	CSS	H	600 m	MPC · JPL
581032	2015 FP_{41}	—	October 13, 2007	Mount Lemmon	Mount Lemmon Survey	KOR	1.3 km	MPC · JPL
581033	2015 FB_{44}	—	March 17, 2015	Haleakala	Pan-STARRS 1	·	2.3 km	MPC · JPL
581034	2015 FM_{44}	—	April 13, 2004	Kitt Peak	Spacewatch	EOS	1.8 km	MPC · JPL
581035	2015 FN_{44}	—	September 5, 2000	Apache Point	SDSS Collaboration	·	2.1 km	MPC · JPL
581036	2015 FL_{46}	—	January 29, 2011	Kitt Peak	Spacewatch	·	1.0 km	MPC · JPL
581037	2015 FF_{47}	—	March 8, 2008	Mount Lemmon	Mount Lemmon Survey	V	520 m	MPC · JPL
581038	2015 FP_{48}	—	March 9, 2011	Mount Lemmon	Mount Lemmon Survey	HNS	970 m	MPC · JPL
581039	2015 FE_{50}	—	January 16, 2015	Haleakala	Pan-STARRS 1	·	1.5 km	MPC · JPL
581040	2015 FC_{53}	—	January 25, 2015	Haleakala	Pan-STARRS 1	·	1.2 km	MPC · JPL
581041	2015 FC_{54}	—	January 24, 2015	Haleakala	Pan-STARRS 1	·	1.1 km	MPC · JPL
581042	2015 FJ_{56}	—	March 9, 2007	Kitt Peak	Spacewatch	HNS	1.0 km	MPC · JPL
581043	2015 FY_{56}	—	March 27, 2007	Mount Lemmon	Mount Lemmon Survey	EUN	1.3 km	MPC · JPL
581044	2015 FZ_{58}	—	January 24, 2015	Haleakala	Pan-STARRS 1	·	2.5 km	MPC · JPL
581045	2015 FG_{60}	—	March 18, 2015	Haleakala	Pan-STARRS 1	ADE	1.5 km	MPC · JPL
581046	2015 FN_{60}	—	June 16, 2012	Mount Lemmon	Mount Lemmon Survey	·	1.9 km	MPC · JPL
581047	2015 FX_{61}	—	February 20, 2015	Haleakala	Pan-STARRS 1	·	1.8 km	MPC · JPL
581048	2015 FG_{63}	—	January 26, 2015	Haleakala	Pan-STARRS 1	EUN	880 m	MPC · JPL
581049	2015 FD_{64}	—	November 27, 2013	Haleakala	Pan-STARRS 1	ARM	3.4 km	MPC · JPL
581050	2015 FU_{66}	—	March 18, 2015	Haleakala	Pan-STARRS 1	HNS	880 m	MPC · JPL
581051	2015 FY_{68}	—	February 16, 2015	Haleakala	Pan-STARRS 1	PHO	680 m	MPC · JPL
581052	2015 FQ_{69}	—	March 18, 2015	Haleakala	Pan-STARRS 1	·	1.7 km	MPC · JPL
581053	2015 FB_{70}	—	November 14, 2012	Mount Lemmon	Mount Lemmon Survey	·	3.0 km	MPC · JPL
581054	2015 FM_{71}	—	March 17, 2015	Haleakala	Pan-STARRS 1	EUP	3.1 km	MPC · JPL
581055	2015 FG_{72}	—	December 19, 2009	Mount Lemmon	Mount Lemmon Survey	·	1.3 km	MPC · JPL
581056	2015 FP_{73}	—	April 9, 2006	Kitt Peak	Spacewatch	·	1.9 km	MPC · JPL
581057	2015 FS_{73}	—	September 17, 2006	Kitt Peak	Spacewatch	·	2.5 km	MPC · JPL
581058	2015 FU_{73}	—	August 26, 2012	Haleakala	Pan-STARRS 1	·	1.8 km	MPC · JPL
581059	2015 FH_{74}	—	January 25, 2015	Haleakala	Pan-STARRS 1	JUN	910 m	MPC · JPL
581060	2015 FL_{74}	—	May 8, 2005	Mount Lemmon	Mount Lemmon Survey	·	1.8 km	MPC · JPL
581061	2015 FM_{74}	—	October 13, 2007	Mount Lemmon	Mount Lemmon Survey	KOR	1.2 km	MPC · JPL
581062	2015 FR_{74}	—	March 18, 2015	Haleakala	Pan-STARRS 1	·	1.5 km	MPC · JPL
581063	2015 FA_{76}	—	March 2, 2009	Kitt Peak	Spacewatch	·	2.2 km	MPC · JPL
581064	2015 FM_{76}	—	March 18, 2015	Haleakala	Pan-STARRS 1	·	1.5 km	MPC · JPL
581065	2015 FO_{77}	—	November 4, 2007	Mount Lemmon	Mount Lemmon Survey	·	2.7 km	MPC · JPL
581066	2015 FL_{80}	—	September 29, 2008	Mount Lemmon	Mount Lemmon Survey	GEF	1.6 km	MPC · JPL
581067	2015 FH_{81}	—	October 17, 2003	Kitt Peak	Spacewatch	·	740 m	MPC · JPL
581068	2015 FW_{82}	—	July 1, 2008	Catalina	CSS	·	1.7 km	MPC · JPL
581069	2015 FZ_{83}	—	January 26, 2015	Haleakala	Pan-STARRS 1	·	1.7 km	MPC · JPL
581070	2015 FG_{85}	—	November 27, 2013	Haleakala	Pan-STARRS 1	·	2.3 km	MPC · JPL
581071	2015 FG_{86}	—	March 20, 2015	Haleakala	Pan-STARRS 1	·	1.6 km	MPC · JPL
581072	2015 FE_{88}	—	October 10, 2012	Mount Lemmon	Mount Lemmon Survey	·	2.1 km	MPC · JPL
581073	2015 FK_{88}	—	September 25, 2012	Mount Lemmon	Mount Lemmon Survey	·	1.8 km	MPC · JPL
581074	2015 FL_{88}	—	October 7, 2008	Kitt Peak	Spacewatch	·	2.0 km	MPC · JPL
581075	2015 FG_{91}	—	May 8, 2011	Kitt Peak	Spacewatch	·	1.8 km	MPC · JPL
581076	2015 FB_{92}	—	May 28, 2012	Mount Lemmon	Mount Lemmon Survey	·	1.9 km	MPC · JPL
581077	2015 FG_{96}	—	January 28, 2015	Haleakala	Pan-STARRS 1	H	410 m	MPC · JPL
581078	2015 FP_{97}	—	September 23, 2012	Mayhill-ISON	L. Elenin	·	2.1 km	MPC · JPL
581079	2015 FN_{98}	—	March 20, 2015	Haleakala	Pan-STARRS 1	·	1.6 km	MPC · JPL
581080	2015 FW_{100}	—	October 8, 2012	Mount Lemmon	Mount Lemmon Survey	·	2.0 km	MPC · JPL
581081	2015 FX_{100}	—	October 16, 2012	Mount Lemmon	Mount Lemmon Survey	·	2.5 km	MPC · JPL
581082	2015 FZ_{104}	—	August 26, 2012	Haleakala	Pan-STARRS 1	EOS	1.6 km	MPC · JPL
581083	2015 FR_{106}	—	November 1, 2008	Kitt Peak	Spacewatch	·	1.7 km	MPC · JPL
581084	2015 FS_{106}	—	March 20, 2015	Haleakala	Pan-STARRS 1	·	1.8 km	MPC · JPL
581085	2015 FV_{107}	—	September 3, 2008	Kitt Peak	Spacewatch	L4	9.4 km	MPC · JPL
581086	2015 FH_{108}	—	November 20, 2004	Kitt Peak	Spacewatch	·	2.0 km	MPC · JPL
581087	2015 FU_{111}	—	October 9, 2012	Mount Lemmon	Mount Lemmon Survey	AGN	1.0 km	MPC · JPL
581088	2015 FC_{113}	—	December 14, 2013	Mount Lemmon	Mount Lemmon Survey	EOS	1.5 km	MPC · JPL
581089	2015 FK_{113}	—	January 22, 2015	Haleakala	Pan-STARRS 1	TIR	1.9 km	MPC · JPL
581090	2015 FE_{115}	—	November 12, 2007	Mount Lemmon	Mount Lemmon Survey	·	2.5 km	MPC · JPL
581091	2015 FQ_{115}	—	February 3, 2009	Mount Lemmon	Mount Lemmon Survey	·	2.5 km	MPC · JPL
581092	2015 FU_{116}	—	November 1, 2008	Mount Lemmon	Mount Lemmon Survey	·	1.8 km	MPC · JPL
581093	2015 FJ_{117}	—	February 10, 2007	Palomar	NEAT	H	470 m	MPC · JPL
581094	2015 FZ_{123}	—	February 10, 2011	Mount Lemmon	Mount Lemmon Survey	NYS	1.1 km	MPC · JPL
581095	2015 FA_{124}	—	January 19, 2015	Haleakala	Pan-STARRS 1	·	2.1 km	MPC · JPL
581096	2015 FM_{124}	—	January 18, 2013	Haleakala	Pan-STARRS 1	L4	10 km	MPC · JPL
581097	2015 FY_{127}	—	March 13, 2011	Mount Lemmon	Mount Lemmon Survey	EUN	1.1 km	MPC · JPL
581098	2015 FC_{129}	—	January 19, 2015	Haleakala	Pan-STARRS 1	·	1.7 km	MPC · JPL
581099	2015 FT_{129}	—	November 11, 2013	Kitt Peak	Spacewatch	EUN	1.1 km	MPC · JPL
581100	2015 FW_{130}	—	December 10, 2009	Mount Lemmon	Mount Lemmon Survey	·	2.1 km	MPC · JPL

== 581101–581200 ==
back to top

Designation			Discovery			Properties		Ref
Permanent	Provisional	Named after	Date	Site	Discoverer(s)	Category	Diam.	Ref
581101	2015 FK_{133}	—	November 6, 1996	Kitt Peak	Spacewatch	·	1.7 km	MPC · JPL
581102	2015 FW_{133}	—	June 12, 2012	Haleakala	Pan-STARRS 1	·	710 m	MPC · JPL
581103	2015 FU_{134}	—	September 23, 2008	Kitt Peak	Spacewatch	·	1.5 km	MPC · JPL
581104	2015 FX_{134}	—	February 16, 2015	Haleakala	Pan-STARRS 1	HOF	2.1 km	MPC · JPL
581105	2015 FH_{135}	—	August 26, 2012	Haleakala	Pan-STARRS 1	·	1.7 km	MPC · JPL
581106	2015 FS_{135}	—	August 21, 2006	Kitt Peak	Spacewatch	·	2.4 km	MPC · JPL
581107	2015 FW_{136}	—	November 8, 2013	Kitt Peak	Spacewatch	·	730 m	MPC · JPL
581108	2015 FV_{139}	—	November 29, 2005	Kitt Peak	Spacewatch	·	1.1 km	MPC · JPL
581109	2015 FA_{141}	—	March 21, 2015	Haleakala	Pan-STARRS 1	KOR	1.1 km	MPC · JPL
581110	2015 FS_{141}	—	September 12, 2007	Mount Lemmon	Mount Lemmon Survey	EOS	1.7 km	MPC · JPL
581111	2015 FU_{141}	—	March 13, 2004	Palomar	NEAT	·	3.3 km	MPC · JPL
581112	2015 FB_{142}	—	February 2, 2009	Kitt Peak	Spacewatch	·	2.0 km	MPC · JPL
581113	2015 FG_{142}	—	September 22, 2003	Kitt Peak	Spacewatch	·	1.7 km	MPC · JPL
581114	2015 FJ_{142}	—	March 18, 2010	Mount Lemmon	Mount Lemmon Survey	KOR	1.2 km	MPC · JPL
581115	2015 FL_{142}	—	March 17, 2015	Mount Lemmon	Mount Lemmon Survey	·	1.9 km	MPC · JPL
581116	2015 FT_{143}	—	January 23, 2015	Haleakala	Pan-STARRS 1	MAS	580 m	MPC · JPL
581117	2015 FZ_{145}	—	July 25, 2008	Mount Lemmon	Mount Lemmon Survey	·	980 m	MPC · JPL
581118	2015 FN_{146}	—	May 2, 2006	Mount Lemmon	Mount Lemmon Survey	·	1.8 km	MPC · JPL
581119	2015 FY_{146}	—	February 6, 2011	Mount Lemmon	Mount Lemmon Survey	NYS	1.0 km	MPC · JPL
581120	2015 FO_{147}	—	March 21, 2015	Haleakala	Pan-STARRS 1	·	1.6 km	MPC · JPL
581121	2015 FT_{149}	—	October 3, 2008	Mount Lemmon	Mount Lemmon Survey	·	1.3 km	MPC · JPL
581122	2015 FJ_{152}	—	September 28, 2003	Kitt Peak	Spacewatch	HOF	2.3 km	MPC · JPL
581123	2015 FK_{156}	—	September 26, 2003	Apache Point	SDSS	AGN	1.2 km	MPC · JPL
581124	2015 FS_{161}	—	March 21, 2015	Haleakala	Pan-STARRS 1	·	1.3 km	MPC · JPL
581125	2015 FJ_{163}	—	February 23, 2015	Haleakala	Pan-STARRS 1	·	1.6 km	MPC · JPL
581126	2015 FT_{164}	—	April 11, 2010	Kitt Peak	Spacewatch	EOS	1.4 km	MPC · JPL
581127	2015 FD_{167}	—	March 23, 2006	Kitt Peak	Spacewatch	·	1.5 km	MPC · JPL
581128	2015 FR_{167}	—	January 31, 2009	Kitt Peak	Spacewatch	THM	1.8 km	MPC · JPL
581129	2015 FC_{168}	—	October 11, 2012	Mount Lemmon	Mount Lemmon Survey	KOR	1.4 km	MPC · JPL
581130	2015 FW_{168}	—	October 6, 2008	Mount Lemmon	Mount Lemmon Survey	·	2.4 km	MPC · JPL
581131	2015 FV_{169}	—	March 21, 2015	Haleakala	Pan-STARRS 1	KOR	1.2 km	MPC · JPL
581132	2015 FC_{171}	—	October 26, 2008	Mount Lemmon	Mount Lemmon Survey	·	1.4 km	MPC · JPL
581133	2015 FQ_{171}	—	April 6, 2011	Mount Lemmon	Mount Lemmon Survey	·	1.5 km	MPC · JPL
581134	2015 FN_{172}	—	March 21, 2015	Haleakala	Pan-STARRS 1	MAR	690 m	MPC · JPL
581135	2015 FT_{172}	—	October 14, 2012	ESA OGS	ESA OGS	KOR	1.2 km	MPC · JPL
581136	2015 FU_{173}	—	November 8, 2007	Kitt Peak	Spacewatch	EOS	1.6 km	MPC · JPL
581137	2015 FD_{175}	—	January 28, 2015	Haleakala	Pan-STARRS 1	·	1.8 km	MPC · JPL
581138	2015 FS_{175}	—	September 24, 2011	Haleakala	Pan-STARRS 1	·	3.2 km	MPC · JPL
581139	2015 FT_{175}	—	November 3, 2007	Mount Lemmon	Mount Lemmon Survey	·	3.4 km	MPC · JPL
581140	2015 FD_{176}	—	January 1, 2014	Haleakala	Pan-STARRS 1	EOS	1.4 km	MPC · JPL
581141	2015 FC_{178}	—	September 26, 2003	Apache Point	SDSS Collaboration	PAD	1.4 km	MPC · JPL
581142	2015 FT_{179}	—	October 23, 2008	Mount Lemmon	Mount Lemmon Survey	·	1.6 km	MPC · JPL
581143	2015 FW_{179}	—	January 17, 2007	Kitt Peak	Spacewatch	·	940 m	MPC · JPL
581144	2015 FN_{180}	—	January 23, 2015	Haleakala	Pan-STARRS 1	·	2.3 km	MPC · JPL
581145	2015 FP_{180}	—	April 27, 2011	Mount Lemmon	Mount Lemmon Survey	·	1.5 km	MPC · JPL
581146	2015 FW_{180}	—	March 10, 2005	Kitt Peak	Deep Ecliptic Survey	KOR	1.3 km	MPC · JPL
581147	2015 FQ_{181}	—	July 5, 2003	Kitt Peak	Spacewatch	·	2.1 km	MPC · JPL
581148	2015 FA_{182}	—	March 6, 2011	Mount Lemmon	Mount Lemmon Survey	NYS	1.0 km	MPC · JPL
581149	2015 FR_{182}	—	October 23, 2013	Mount Lemmon	Mount Lemmon Survey	V	530 m	MPC · JPL
581150	2015 FA_{184}	—	October 5, 2012	Haleakala	Pan-STARRS 1	·	1.5 km	MPC · JPL
581151	2015 FX_{184}	—	January 7, 2006	Kitt Peak	Spacewatch	·	1.3 km	MPC · JPL
581152	2015 FF_{189}	—	January 23, 2015	Haleakala	Pan-STARRS 1	HNS	1.0 km	MPC · JPL
581153	2015 FP_{189}	—	November 7, 2008	Mount Lemmon	Mount Lemmon Survey	·	1.7 km	MPC · JPL
581154	2015 FL_{191}	—	September 20, 2003	Kitt Peak	Spacewatch	·	1.8 km	MPC · JPL
581155	2015 FQ_{192}	—	October 26, 2009	Mount Lemmon	Mount Lemmon Survey	·	1.3 km	MPC · JPL
581156	2015 FP_{194}	—	September 4, 2008	Kitt Peak	Spacewatch	·	1.5 km	MPC · JPL
581157	2015 FE_{195}	—	January 30, 2006	Kitt Peak	Spacewatch	·	1.4 km	MPC · JPL
581158	2015 FW_{195}	—	February 24, 2015	Haleakala	Pan-STARRS 1	EMA	2.5 km	MPC · JPL
581159	2015 FC_{196}	—	January 2, 1997	Kitt Peak	Spacewatch	·	1.5 km	MPC · JPL
581160	2015 FM_{196}	—	November 7, 2005	Mauna Kea	A. Boattini	·	1.4 km	MPC · JPL
581161	2015 FT_{197}	—	February 13, 2004	Palomar	NEAT	EOS	2.1 km	MPC · JPL
581162	2015 FZ_{197}	—	October 1, 2008	Mount Lemmon	Mount Lemmon Survey	·	1.6 km	MPC · JPL
581163	2015 FJ_{198}	—	December 19, 2009	Mount Lemmon	Mount Lemmon Survey	·	1.6 km	MPC · JPL
581164	2015 FW_{198}	—	January 23, 2006	Kitt Peak	Spacewatch	·	1.9 km	MPC · JPL
581165	2015 FU_{199}	—	March 10, 2008	Kitt Peak	Spacewatch	·	840 m	MPC · JPL
581166	2015 FZ_{199}	—	February 24, 2015	Haleakala	Pan-STARRS 1	·	1.2 km	MPC · JPL
581167	2015 FB_{200}	—	August 31, 2008	Molėtai	K. Černis, J. Zdanavičius	·	1.8 km	MPC · JPL
581168	2015 FQ_{202}	—	February 5, 2011	Mount Lemmon	Mount Lemmon Survey	NYS	950 m	MPC · JPL
581169	2015 FD_{203}	—	August 23, 2007	Kitt Peak	Spacewatch	·	1.9 km	MPC · JPL
581170	2015 FY_{203}	—	September 24, 2008	Mount Lemmon	Mount Lemmon Survey	·	2.0 km	MPC · JPL
581171	2015 FM_{204}	—	January 23, 2015	Haleakala	Pan-STARRS 1	EUN	1.2 km	MPC · JPL
581172	2015 FV_{205}	—	January 23, 2015	Haleakala	Pan-STARRS 1	·	2.4 km	MPC · JPL
581173	2015 FD_{206}	—	September 18, 2009	Kitt Peak	Spacewatch	·	790 m	MPC · JPL
581174	2015 FZ_{208}	—	August 14, 2012	Kitt Peak	Spacewatch	EOS	1.5 km	MPC · JPL
581175	2015 FA_{210}	—	January 22, 2015	Haleakala	Pan-STARRS 1	·	790 m	MPC · JPL
581176	2015 FY_{210}	—	March 22, 2015	Haleakala	Pan-STARRS 1	·	1.5 km	MPC · JPL
581177	2015 FZ_{212}	—	November 5, 2007	Mount Lemmon	Mount Lemmon Survey	·	2.3 km	MPC · JPL
581178	2015 FR_{213}	—	March 22, 2015	Haleakala	Pan-STARRS 1	·	1.7 km	MPC · JPL
581179	2015 FN_{216}	—	December 18, 2009	Kitt Peak	Spacewatch	·	1.9 km	MPC · JPL
581180	2015 FE_{219}	—	September 29, 2008	Kitt Peak	Spacewatch	·	1.5 km	MPC · JPL
581181	2015 FN_{220}	—	November 1, 2008	Mount Lemmon	Mount Lemmon Survey	·	1.7 km	MPC · JPL
581182	2015 FD_{222}	—	February 16, 2010	Kitt Peak	Spacewatch	·	1.7 km	MPC · JPL
581183	2015 FQ_{222}	—	October 25, 2008	Kitt Peak	Spacewatch	·	1.4 km	MPC · JPL
581184	2015 FW_{223}	—	October 21, 2003	Kitt Peak	Spacewatch	AGN	1.2 km	MPC · JPL
581185	2015 FP_{224}	—	September 6, 2008	Mount Lemmon	Mount Lemmon Survey	·	1.7 km	MPC · JPL
581186	2015 FD_{226}	—	November 28, 2013	Mount Lemmon	Mount Lemmon Survey	·	1.5 km	MPC · JPL
581187	2015 FJ_{226}	—	February 20, 2006	Kitt Peak	Spacewatch	·	1.8 km	MPC · JPL
581188	2015 FF_{230}	—	February 27, 2015	Haleakala	Pan-STARRS 1	V	430 m	MPC · JPL
581189	2015 FY_{230}	—	April 2, 2006	Kitt Peak	Spacewatch	·	1.7 km	MPC · JPL
581190	2015 FJ_{231}	—	March 23, 2015	Haleakala	Pan-STARRS 1	AGN	950 m	MPC · JPL
581191	2015 FS_{231}	—	October 9, 2007	Mount Lemmon	Mount Lemmon Survey	·	1.8 km	MPC · JPL
581192	2015 FW_{231}	—	February 16, 2015	Haleakala	Pan-STARRS 1	·	1.3 km	MPC · JPL
581193	2015 FP_{233}	—	January 31, 2006	Kitt Peak	Spacewatch	·	1.6 km	MPC · JPL
581194	2015 FW_{234}	—	October 21, 2003	Kitt Peak	Spacewatch	AGN	1.1 km	MPC · JPL
581195	2015 FG_{236}	—	March 23, 2015	Haleakala	Pan-STARRS 1	AGN	950 m	MPC · JPL
581196	2015 FD_{240}	—	October 25, 2008	Mount Lemmon	Mount Lemmon Survey	·	1.9 km	MPC · JPL
581197	2015 FZ_{240}	—	November 3, 2004	Palomar	NEAT	·	2.0 km	MPC · JPL
581198	2015 FS_{241}	—	February 18, 2010	Mount Lemmon	Mount Lemmon Survey	PAD	1.4 km	MPC · JPL
581199	2015 FX_{241}	—	October 7, 2008	Mount Lemmon	Mount Lemmon Survey	·	1.4 km	MPC · JPL
581200	2015 FX_{242}	—	October 16, 2012	Mount Lemmon	Mount Lemmon Survey	·	1.5 km	MPC · JPL

== 581201–581300 ==
back to top

Designation			Discovery			Properties		Ref
Permanent	Provisional	Named after	Date	Site	Discoverer(s)	Category	Diam.	Ref
581201	2015 FX_{243}	—	March 23, 2015	Haleakala	Pan-STARRS 1	·	1.6 km	MPC · JPL
581202	2015 FL_{246}	—	October 15, 2007	Mount Lemmon	Mount Lemmon Survey	EOS	1.8 km	MPC · JPL
581203	2015 FN_{246}	—	March 23, 2015	Haleakala	Pan-STARRS 1	·	1.7 km	MPC · JPL
581204	2015 FX_{246}	—	April 24, 2011	Mount Lemmon	Mount Lemmon Survey	(5)	1.6 km	MPC · JPL
581205	2015 FB_{247}	—	January 23, 2015	Haleakala	Pan-STARRS 1	·	1.9 km	MPC · JPL
581206	2015 FR_{247}	—	March 23, 2015	Haleakala	Pan-STARRS 1	·	1.5 km	MPC · JPL
581207	2015 FQ_{248}	—	February 27, 2015	Haleakala	Pan-STARRS 1	·	1.3 km	MPC · JPL
581208	2015 FC_{249}	—	March 23, 2015	Haleakala	Pan-STARRS 1	·	510 m	MPC · JPL
581209	2015 FO_{250}	—	October 28, 2008	Mount Lemmon	Mount Lemmon Survey	·	1.4 km	MPC · JPL
581210	2015 FX_{252}	—	March 17, 2015	Mount Lemmon	Mount Lemmon Survey	·	1.2 km	MPC · JPL
581211	2015 FR_{253}	—	November 21, 2009	Mount Lemmon	Mount Lemmon Survey	·	1.6 km	MPC · JPL
581212	2015 FZ_{253}	—	March 23, 2015	Haleakala	Pan-STARRS 1	·	1.4 km	MPC · JPL
581213	2015 FF_{254}	—	May 7, 2006	Mount Lemmon	Mount Lemmon Survey	·	1.5 km	MPC · JPL
581214	2015 FQ_{254}	—	February 27, 2015	Haleakala	Pan-STARRS 1	·	730 m	MPC · JPL
581215	2015 FD_{256}	—	March 23, 2015	Haleakala	Pan-STARRS 1	·	1.4 km	MPC · JPL
581216	2015 FN_{256}	—	March 23, 2015	Haleakala	Pan-STARRS 1	·	1.5 km	MPC · JPL
581217	2015 FO_{256}	—	February 18, 2015	Haleakala	Pan-STARRS 1	·	1.4 km	MPC · JPL
581218	2015 FU_{256}	—	February 18, 2015	Haleakala	Pan-STARRS 1	TIR	1.5 km	MPC · JPL
581219	2015 FJ_{257}	—	March 23, 2015	Haleakala	Pan-STARRS 1	·	940 m	MPC · JPL
581220	2015 FU_{258}	—	October 22, 2012	Haleakala	Pan-STARRS 1	EMA	2.4 km	MPC · JPL
581221	2015 FO_{260}	—	January 27, 2015	Haleakala	Pan-STARRS 1	·	1.5 km	MPC · JPL
581222	2015 FV_{260}	—	November 16, 2009	Mount Lemmon	Mount Lemmon Survey	AGN	1.3 km	MPC · JPL
581223	2015 FF_{261}	—	January 21, 2015	Haleakala	Pan-STARRS 1	HOF	2.0 km	MPC · JPL
581224	2015 FG_{263}	—	November 27, 2013	Haleakala	Pan-STARRS 1	HOF	1.9 km	MPC · JPL
581225	2015 FJ_{263}	—	February 16, 2015	Haleakala	Pan-STARRS 1	AGN	980 m	MPC · JPL
581226	2015 FK_{263}	—	November 29, 2013	Mount Lemmon	Mount Lemmon Survey	·	1.6 km	MPC · JPL
581227	2015 FP_{263}	—	October 3, 2008	Kitt Peak	Spacewatch	HOF	2.4 km	MPC · JPL
581228	2015 FZ_{263}	—	October 1, 2013	Kitt Peak	Spacewatch	NEM	2.0 km	MPC · JPL
581229	2015 FO_{264}	—	April 7, 2006	Kitt Peak	Spacewatch	·	1.6 km	MPC · JPL
581230	2015 FA_{265}	—	November 1, 2013	Kitt Peak	Spacewatch	PAD	1.6 km	MPC · JPL
581231	2015 FN_{266}	—	May 3, 2008	Mount Lemmon	Mount Lemmon Survey	·	1.1 km	MPC · JPL
581232	2015 FY_{266}	—	September 27, 2009	Kitt Peak	Spacewatch	·	1.1 km	MPC · JPL
581233	2015 FK_{268}	—	October 2, 2008	Mount Lemmon	Mount Lemmon Survey	·	1.6 km	MPC · JPL
581234	2015 FA_{270}	—	November 23, 2008	Kitt Peak	Spacewatch	·	1.4 km	MPC · JPL
581235	2015 FX_{270}	—	November 27, 2013	Haleakala	Pan-STARRS 1	AGN	940 m	MPC · JPL
581236	2015 FT_{271}	—	November 19, 2008	Kitt Peak	Spacewatch	·	1.8 km	MPC · JPL
581237	2015 FQ_{272}	—	October 25, 2008	Mount Lemmon	Mount Lemmon Survey	·	1.8 km	MPC · JPL
581238	2015 FJ_{273}	—	July 12, 2005	Mount Lemmon	Mount Lemmon Survey	·	1.0 km	MPC · JPL
581239	2015 FH_{275}	—	October 28, 2013	Kitt Peak	Spacewatch	·	1.5 km	MPC · JPL
581240	2015 FY_{275}	—	January 28, 2015	Haleakala	Pan-STARRS 1	·	2.1 km	MPC · JPL
581241	2015 FM_{276}	—	November 27, 2013	Haleakala	Pan-STARRS 1	·	1.6 km	MPC · JPL
581242	2015 FN_{276}	—	February 14, 2010	Mount Lemmon	Mount Lemmon Survey	PAD	1.6 km	MPC · JPL
581243	2015 FE_{277}	—	March 5, 2002	Kitt Peak	Spacewatch	MAR	1.0 km	MPC · JPL
581244	2015 FK_{277}	—	February 5, 2009	Kitt Peak	Spacewatch	·	2.3 km	MPC · JPL
581245	2015 FY_{278}	—	April 6, 2011	Mount Lemmon	Mount Lemmon Survey	·	1.9 km	MPC · JPL
581246	2015 FF_{279}	—	February 18, 2015	Haleakala	Pan-STARRS 1	·	1.7 km	MPC · JPL
581247	2015 FG_{279}	—	November 20, 1995	Kitt Peak	Spacewatch	·	1.9 km	MPC · JPL
581248	2015 FM_{280}	—	November 8, 2008	Kitt Peak	Spacewatch	·	1.9 km	MPC · JPL
581249	2015 FN_{280}	—	September 19, 2003	Palomar	NEAT	HOF	3.1 km	MPC · JPL
581250	2015 FC_{283}	—	February 19, 2015	Haleakala	Pan-STARRS 1	HOF	1.8 km	MPC · JPL
581251	2015 FP_{283}	—	November 27, 2013	Haleakala	Pan-STARRS 1	·	1.5 km	MPC · JPL
581252	2015 FR_{285}	—	September 12, 2007	Mount Lemmon	Mount Lemmon Survey	·	2.1 km	MPC · JPL
581253	2015 FQ_{288}	—	January 28, 2015	Haleakala	Pan-STARRS 1	·	2.0 km	MPC · JPL
581254	2015 FX_{290}	—	December 29, 2014	Haleakala	Pan-STARRS 1	BRA	1.5 km	MPC · JPL
581255	2015 FE_{291}	—	August 12, 2013	Kitt Peak	Spacewatch	·	2.2 km	MPC · JPL
581256	2015 FQ_{291}	—	December 16, 2009	Mount Lemmon	Mount Lemmon Survey	·	2.0 km	MPC · JPL
581257	2015 FX_{294}	—	March 28, 2015	Haleakala	Pan-STARRS 1	·	2.1 km	MPC · JPL
581258	2015 FE_{298}	—	March 2, 2006	Kitt Peak	Spacewatch	·	1.1 km	MPC · JPL
581259	2015 FO_{299}	—	November 19, 2006	Catalina	CSS	·	3.3 km	MPC · JPL
581260	2015 FD_{300}	—	September 4, 2011	Haleakala	Pan-STARRS 1	·	2.8 km	MPC · JPL
581261	2015 FP_{300}	—	March 28, 2015	Haleakala	Pan-STARRS 1	·	2.2 km	MPC · JPL
581262	2015 FS_{300}	—	October 26, 2011	Haleakala	Pan-STARRS 1	·	2.6 km	MPC · JPL
581263	2015 FX_{302}	—	July 4, 2005	Mount Lemmon	Mount Lemmon Survey	EOS	2.6 km	MPC · JPL
581264	2015 FF_{303}	—	December 30, 2013	Kitt Peak	Spacewatch	·	2.3 km	MPC · JPL
581265	2015 FP_{306}	—	May 26, 2011	Kitt Peak	Spacewatch	·	1.8 km	MPC · JPL
581266	2015 FX_{307}	—	September 23, 2008	Mount Lemmon	Mount Lemmon Survey	·	1.7 km	MPC · JPL
581267	2015 FB_{308}	—	February 27, 2015	Haleakala	Pan-STARRS 1	AEO	1.2 km	MPC · JPL
581268	2015 FR_{308}	—	January 1, 2014	Mount Lemmon	Mount Lemmon Survey	·	1.6 km	MPC · JPL
581269	2015 FH_{309}	—	April 14, 2005	Kitt Peak	Spacewatch	·	1.5 km	MPC · JPL
581270	2015 FA_{310}	—	August 18, 2009	Kitt Peak	Spacewatch	·	1.1 km	MPC · JPL
581271	2015 FJ_{310}	—	March 25, 2015	Haleakala	Pan-STARRS 1	·	2.1 km	MPC · JPL
581272	2015 FK_{311}	—	November 20, 2009	Kitt Peak	Spacewatch	·	1.9 km	MPC · JPL
581273	2015 FV_{311}	—	April 30, 2004	Kitt Peak	Spacewatch	·	1.1 km	MPC · JPL
581274	2015 FY_{311}	—	April 9, 2003	Palomar	NEAT	·	970 m	MPC · JPL
581275	2015 FM_{312}	—	October 8, 2008	Catalina	CSS	EUN	1.5 km	MPC · JPL
581276	2015 FS_{312}	—	October 24, 2013	Mount Lemmon	Mount Lemmon Survey	·	1.6 km	MPC · JPL
581277	2015 FT_{312}	—	October 22, 2003	Apache Point	SDSS Collaboration	·	2.3 km	MPC · JPL
581278	2015 FQ_{313}	—	January 1, 2009	Kitt Peak	Spacewatch	EOS	2.0 km	MPC · JPL
581279	2015 FD_{315}	—	March 25, 2015	Haleakala	Pan-STARRS 1	·	1.5 km	MPC · JPL
581280	2015 FE_{320}	—	January 30, 2011	Mount Lemmon	Mount Lemmon Survey	·	910 m	MPC · JPL
581281	2015 FF_{320}	—	March 25, 2015	Haleakala	Pan-STARRS 1	·	2.0 km	MPC · JPL
581282	2015 FR_{320}	—	March 25, 2015	Haleakala	Pan-STARRS 1	EOS	1.6 km	MPC · JPL
581283	2015 FW_{320}	—	September 24, 2009	Catalina	CSS	·	1.1 km	MPC · JPL
581284	2015 FF_{321}	—	February 16, 2002	Palomar	NEAT	EUN	1.5 km	MPC · JPL
581285	2015 FX_{321}	—	February 16, 2010	Palomar	Palomar Transient Factory	·	2.1 km	MPC · JPL
581286	2015 FK_{326}	—	October 18, 2012	Haleakala	Pan-STARRS 1	·	1.6 km	MPC · JPL
581287	2015 FY_{326}	—	November 8, 2010	Kitt Peak	Spacewatch	L4	8.3 km	MPC · JPL
581288	2015 FA_{327}	—	March 25, 2015	Haleakala	Pan-STARRS 1	·	1.6 km	MPC · JPL
581289	2015 FP_{328}	—	October 21, 2012	Haleakala	Pan-STARRS 1	·	1.8 km	MPC · JPL
581290	2015 FT_{331}	—	March 28, 2015	Haleakala	Pan-STARRS 1	EOS	1.5 km	MPC · JPL
581291	2015 FH_{333}	—	April 26, 2008	Mount Lemmon	Mount Lemmon Survey	·	870 m	MPC · JPL
581292	2015 FN_{335}	—	March 30, 2015	Haleakala	Pan-STARRS 1	·	2.1 km	MPC · JPL
581293	2015 FB_{339}	—	March 30, 2015	Haleakala	Pan-STARRS 1	·	1.8 km	MPC · JPL
581294	2015 FJ_{339}	—	December 29, 2014	Haleakala	Pan-STARRS 1	BRA	1.5 km	MPC · JPL
581295	2015 FQ_{339}	—	November 21, 2009	Mount Lemmon	Mount Lemmon Survey	·	1.9 km	MPC · JPL
581296	2015 FV_{339}	—	November 28, 2013	Mount Lemmon	Mount Lemmon Survey	·	2.4 km	MPC · JPL
581297	2015 FZ_{340}	—	March 28, 2015	Haleakala	Pan-STARRS 1	H	530 m	MPC · JPL
581298	2015 FV_{343}	—	April 26, 2006	Kitt Peak	Spacewatch	·	2.1 km	MPC · JPL
581299	2015 FX_{343}	—	January 19, 2015	Haleakala	Pan-STARRS 1	·	2.0 km	MPC · JPL
581300	2015 FJ_{351}	—	April 13, 2011	Kitt Peak	Spacewatch	·	1.9 km	MPC · JPL

== 581301–581400 ==
back to top

Designation			Discovery			Properties		Ref
Permanent	Provisional	Named after	Date	Site	Discoverer(s)	Category	Diam.	Ref
581301	2015 FJ_{352}	—	March 27, 2011	Mount Lemmon	Mount Lemmon Survey	TIN	1.0 km	MPC · JPL
581302	2015 FU_{354}	—	September 18, 2007	Kitt Peak	Spacewatch	·	1.6 km	MPC · JPL
581303	2015 FC_{355}	—	March 13, 2004	Palomar	NEAT	·	2.7 km	MPC · JPL
581304	2015 FR_{355}	—	September 14, 2005	Kitt Peak	Spacewatch	·	790 m	MPC · JPL
581305	2015 FV_{357}	—	October 8, 2007	Mount Lemmon	Mount Lemmon Survey	·	1.8 km	MPC · JPL
581306	2015 FD_{359}	—	December 20, 2004	Mount Lemmon	Mount Lemmon Survey	AGN	1.3 km	MPC · JPL
581307	2015 FY_{360}	—	October 21, 2011	Kitt Peak	Spacewatch	·	2.7 km	MPC · JPL
581308	2015 FB_{361}	—	January 28, 2015	Haleakala	Pan-STARRS 1	·	2.7 km	MPC · JPL
581309	2015 FM_{364}	—	March 13, 2011	Kitt Peak	Spacewatch	·	1.4 km	MPC · JPL
581310	2015 FZ_{365}	—	November 29, 2013	Mount Lemmon	Mount Lemmon Survey	·	1.8 km	MPC · JPL
581311	2015 FU_{367}	—	September 15, 2012	Mount Lemmon	Mount Lemmon Survey	EOS	1.7 km	MPC · JPL
581312	2015 FX_{367}	—	October 1, 2003	Kitt Peak	Spacewatch	·	1.9 km	MPC · JPL
581313	2015 FJ_{368}	—	November 2, 2013	Mount Lemmon	Mount Lemmon Survey	EOS	1.5 km	MPC · JPL
581314	2015 FO_{368}	—	January 20, 2015	Haleakala	Pan-STARRS 1	·	1.4 km	MPC · JPL
581315	2015 FC_{371}	—	December 14, 2013	Mount Lemmon	Mount Lemmon Survey	·	1.9 km	MPC · JPL
581316	2015 FB_{374}	—	April 12, 2010	Mount Lemmon	Mount Lemmon Survey	·	1.4 km	MPC · JPL
581317	2015 FB_{375}	—	October 27, 2009	Mount Lemmon	Mount Lemmon Survey	EUN	970 m	MPC · JPL
581318	2015 FM_{377}	—	November 14, 2013	Mount Lemmon	Mount Lemmon Survey	·	1.6 km	MPC · JPL
581319	2015 FQ_{378}	—	October 8, 2008	Mount Lemmon	Mount Lemmon Survey	·	1.6 km	MPC · JPL
581320	2015 FJ_{379}	—	November 26, 2013	Mount Lemmon	Mount Lemmon Survey	EOS	1.5 km	MPC · JPL
581321	2015 FK_{380}	—	August 25, 2004	Kitt Peak	Spacewatch	·	1.4 km	MPC · JPL
581322	2015 FP_{380}	—	February 20, 2015	Haleakala	Pan-STARRS 1	·	2.0 km	MPC · JPL
581323	2015 FJ_{382}	—	December 1, 2005	Kitt Peak	Wasserman, L. H., Millis, R. L.	·	1.2 km	MPC · JPL
581324	2015 FC_{383}	—	August 24, 2012	Kitt Peak	Spacewatch	GEF	990 m	MPC · JPL
581325	2015 FE_{383}	—	September 16, 2012	Catalina	CSS	·	2.3 km	MPC · JPL
581326	2015 FO_{384}	—	October 20, 2008	Mount Lemmon	Mount Lemmon Survey	·	1.7 km	MPC · JPL
581327	2015 FS_{384}	—	November 2, 2013	Mount Lemmon	Mount Lemmon Survey	·	1.4 km	MPC · JPL
581328	2015 FS_{385}	—	March 15, 2004	Kitt Peak	Spacewatch	EOS	1.5 km	MPC · JPL
581329	2015 FN_{386}	—	December 11, 2013	Haleakala	Pan-STARRS 1	·	2.4 km	MPC · JPL
581330	2015 FJ_{387}	—	July 29, 2008	Kitt Peak	Spacewatch	L4	8.2 km	MPC · JPL
581331	2015 FB_{389}	—	January 20, 2015	Haleakala	Pan-STARRS 1	·	2.1 km	MPC · JPL
581332	2015 FL_{391}	—	March 20, 2015	Haleakala	Pan-STARRS 1	·	1.8 km	MPC · JPL
581333	2015 FY_{392}	—	March 19, 2015	Haleakala	Pan-STARRS 1	H	470 m	MPC · JPL
581334	2015 FV_{393}	—	March 31, 2015	Haleakala	Pan-STARRS 1	·	950 m	MPC · JPL
581335	2015 FE_{395}	—	March 21, 2015	Haleakala	Pan-STARRS 1	TEL	980 m	MPC · JPL
581336	2015 FW_{395}	—	March 28, 2015	Haleakala	Pan-STARRS 1	EUN	810 m	MPC · JPL
581337	2015 FJ_{397}	—	March 30, 2015	Haleakala	Pan-STARRS 1	·	1.2 km	MPC · JPL
581338	2015 FH_{404}	—	March 28, 2015	Haleakala	Pan-STARRS 1	TIR	1.8 km	MPC · JPL
581339	2015 FD_{405}	—	March 29, 2015	Kitt Peak	Spacewatch	·	1.3 km	MPC · JPL
581340	2015 FU_{405}	—	March 26, 2004	Kitt Peak	Spacewatch	·	950 m	MPC · JPL
581341	2015 FU_{406}	—	March 19, 2015	Haleakala	Pan-STARRS 1	·	1.4 km	MPC · JPL
581342	2015 FT_{407}	—	March 18, 2010	Mount Lemmon	Mount Lemmon Survey	MRX	750 m	MPC · JPL
581343	2015 FF_{408}	—	November 14, 2012	Mauna Kea	M. Micheli, Draginda, A.	·	2.2 km	MPC · JPL
581344	2015 FK_{410}	—	March 23, 2015	Mount Lemmon	Mount Lemmon Survey	·	1.6 km	MPC · JPL
581345	2015 FD_{411}	—	March 19, 2010	Mount Lemmon	Mount Lemmon Survey	·	1.5 km	MPC · JPL
581346	2015 FG_{411}	—	January 25, 2015	Haleakala	Pan-STARRS 1	·	2.3 km	MPC · JPL
581347	2015 FJ_{411}	—	November 13, 2012	ESA OGS	ESA OGS	ARM	4.0 km	MPC · JPL
581348	2015 FM_{411}	—	March 25, 2015	Haleakala	Pan-STARRS 1	·	2.3 km	MPC · JPL
581349	2015 FN_{411}	—	March 25, 2015	Haleakala	Pan-STARRS 1	BRA	1.1 km	MPC · JPL
581350	2015 FW_{411}	—	March 28, 2015	Haleakala	Pan-STARRS 1	·	2.0 km	MPC · JPL
581351	2015 FD_{413}	—	March 29, 2015	Haleakala	Pan-STARRS 1	·	2.4 km	MPC · JPL
581352	2015 FK_{415}	—	March 31, 2015	Haleakala	Pan-STARRS 1	·	780 m	MPC · JPL
581353	2015 FT_{415}	—	March 30, 2015	Haleakala	Pan-STARRS 1	·	800 m	MPC · JPL
581354	2015 FW_{415}	—	March 21, 2015	Haleakala	Pan-STARRS 1	·	2.1 km	MPC · JPL
581355	2015 FP_{416}	—	July 31, 2016	Haleakala	Pan-STARRS 1	·	1.8 km	MPC · JPL
581356	2015 FA_{417}	—	March 18, 2015	Haleakala	Pan-STARRS 1	·	2.0 km	MPC · JPL
581357	2015 FK_{418}	—	July 12, 2005	Mount Lemmon	Mount Lemmon Survey	·	2.8 km	MPC · JPL
581358	2015 FF_{421}	—	March 25, 2015	Haleakala	Pan-STARRS 1	PHO	640 m	MPC · JPL
581359	2015 FB_{427}	—	March 26, 2015	Mount Lemmon	Mount Lemmon Survey	·	2.5 km	MPC · JPL
581360	2015 FC_{427}	—	March 28, 2015	Haleakala	Pan-STARRS 1	EOS	1.4 km	MPC · JPL
581361	2015 FK_{427}	—	March 17, 2015	Mount Lemmon	Mount Lemmon Survey	HOF	2.2 km	MPC · JPL
581362	2015 FP_{427}	—	March 18, 2015	Haleakala	Pan-STARRS 1	·	1.3 km	MPC · JPL
581363	2015 FW_{427}	—	March 22, 2015	Haleakala	Pan-STARRS 1	GEF	1.1 km	MPC · JPL
581364	2015 FS_{429}	—	March 21, 2015	Haleakala	Pan-STARRS 1	·	1.4 km	MPC · JPL
581365	2015 FA_{430}	—	March 23, 2015	Haleakala	Pan-STARRS 1	HOF	2.1 km	MPC · JPL
581366	2015 FE_{430}	—	March 29, 2015	Kitt Peak	Spacewatch	·	1.7 km	MPC · JPL
581367	2015 FR_{433}	—	March 24, 2015	Haleakala	Pan-STARRS 1	·	1.7 km	MPC · JPL
581368	2015 FS_{433}	—	March 30, 2015	Haleakala	Pan-STARRS 1	·	1.7 km	MPC · JPL
581369	2015 FK_{436}	—	March 17, 2015	Haleakala	Pan-STARRS 1	KOR	1.1 km	MPC · JPL
581370	2015 FC_{437}	—	March 21, 2015	Haleakala	Pan-STARRS 1	L4 · (8060)	6.3 km	MPC · JPL
581371	2015 FN_{437}	—	March 21, 2015	Haleakala	Pan-STARRS 1	·	1.5 km	MPC · JPL
581372	2015 FP_{439}	—	March 31, 2015	Haleakala	Pan-STARRS 1	·	870 m	MPC · JPL
581373	2015 FN_{440}	—	September 29, 2008	Kitt Peak	Spacewatch	PAD	1.2 km	MPC · JPL
581374	2015 FJ_{443}	—	January 20, 2015	Haleakala	Pan-STARRS 1	·	2.1 km	MPC · JPL
581375	2015 GC_{1}	—	September 5, 2008	Kitt Peak	Spacewatch	H	480 m	MPC · JPL
581376	2015 GY_{1}	—	September 17, 2013	Mount Lemmon	Mount Lemmon Survey	·	2.0 km	MPC · JPL
581377	2015 GE_{3}	—	February 5, 2011	Haleakala	Pan-STARRS 1	·	1.0 km	MPC · JPL
581378	2015 GO_{3}	—	October 27, 2006	Mount Lemmon	Mount Lemmon Survey	·	660 m	MPC · JPL
581379	2015 GP_{4}	—	October 11, 2007	Mount Lemmon	Mount Lemmon Survey	EOS	1.7 km	MPC · JPL
581380	2015 GC_{5}	—	October 11, 2012	Haleakala	Pan-STARRS 1	·	1.6 km	MPC · JPL
581381	2015 GD_{6}	—	September 24, 2000	Kvistaberg	Uppsala-DLR Asteroid Survey	H	610 m	MPC · JPL
581382	2015 GU_{8}	—	April 2, 2011	Kitt Peak	Spacewatch	·	2.0 km	MPC · JPL
581383	2015 GN_{9}	—	October 28, 2008	Kitt Peak	Spacewatch	BRA	1.4 km	MPC · JPL
581384	2015 GL_{10}	—	September 22, 2008	Catalina	CSS	·	2.6 km	MPC · JPL
581385	2015 GV_{10}	—	November 3, 2008	Mount Lemmon	Mount Lemmon Survey	·	1.8 km	MPC · JPL
581386	2015 GF_{11}	—	February 18, 2015	Haleakala	Pan-STARRS 1	EUN	1.0 km	MPC · JPL
581387	2015 GO_{11}	—	February 7, 2006	Catalina	CSS	·	2.2 km	MPC · JPL
581388	2015 GT_{11}	—	December 29, 2014	Haleakala	Pan-STARRS 1	·	1.6 km	MPC · JPL
581389	2015 GG_{14}	—	October 1, 2003	Kitt Peak	Spacewatch	·	2.5 km	MPC · JPL
581390	2015 GR_{15}	—	September 10, 2007	Kitt Peak	Spacewatch	AGN	1.0 km	MPC · JPL
581391	2015 GE_{16}	—	February 26, 2004	Kitt Peak	Deep Ecliptic Survey	·	1.9 km	MPC · JPL
581392	2015 GN_{17}	—	October 7, 2008	Mount Lemmon	Mount Lemmon Survey	615	1.2 km	MPC · JPL
581393	2015 GD_{19}	—	January 25, 2015	Haleakala	Pan-STARRS 1	·	2.0 km	MPC · JPL
581394	2015 GL_{21}	—	March 30, 2015	Haleakala	Pan-STARRS 1	EOS	1.5 km	MPC · JPL
581395	2015 GK_{23}	—	March 28, 2015	Haleakala	Pan-STARRS 1	·	2.7 km	MPC · JPL
581396	2015 GO_{23}	—	March 29, 2015	Haleakala	Pan-STARRS 1	·	1.8 km	MPC · JPL
581397	2015 GU_{23}	—	January 25, 2014	Haleakala	Pan-STARRS 1	·	1.7 km	MPC · JPL
581398	2015 GH_{24}	—	January 28, 2015	Haleakala	Pan-STARRS 1	·	2.6 km	MPC · JPL
581399	2015 GC_{25}	—	October 12, 2006	Palomar	NEAT	EOS	2.5 km	MPC · JPL
581400	2015 GY_{25}	—	March 1, 2009	Kitt Peak	Spacewatch	·	2.5 km	MPC · JPL

== 581401–581500 ==
back to top

Designation			Discovery			Properties		Ref
Permanent	Provisional	Named after	Date	Site	Discoverer(s)	Category	Diam.	Ref
581401	2015 GS_{29}	—	September 21, 2003	Kitt Peak	Spacewatch	·	1.9 km	MPC · JPL
581402	2015 GY_{29}	—	August 31, 2002	Kitt Peak	Spacewatch	KOR	1.3 km	MPC · JPL
581403	2015 GQ_{31}	—	September 17, 2012	Kitt Peak	Spacewatch	·	2.0 km	MPC · JPL
581404	2015 GD_{32}	—	November 10, 2013	Kitt Peak	Spacewatch	·	1.1 km	MPC · JPL
581405	2015 GT_{32}	—	January 24, 2014	Haleakala	Pan-STARRS 1	·	2.4 km	MPC · JPL
581406	2015 GM_{33}	—	March 21, 2015	Haleakala	Pan-STARRS 1	·	2.4 km	MPC · JPL
581407	2015 GL_{35}	—	October 3, 2006	Mount Lemmon	Mount Lemmon Survey	·	520 m	MPC · JPL
581408	2015 GT_{38}	—	March 25, 2015	Haleakala	Pan-STARRS 1	·	1.6 km	MPC · JPL
581409	2015 GN_{39}	—	March 27, 2015	Haleakala	Pan-STARRS 1	VER	1.9 km	MPC · JPL
581410	2015 GR_{41}	—	March 22, 2015	Haleakala	Pan-STARRS 1	·	1.3 km	MPC · JPL
581411	2015 GT_{41}	—	January 3, 2014	Mount Lemmon	Mount Lemmon Survey	BRA	1.2 km	MPC · JPL
581412	2015 GP_{44}	—	August 15, 2002	Kitt Peak	Spacewatch	·	2.2 km	MPC · JPL
581413	2015 GT_{46}	—	April 25, 2007	Mount Lemmon	Mount Lemmon Survey	MAR	870 m	MPC · JPL
581414	2015 GE_{48}	—	March 27, 2015	Haleakala	Pan-STARRS 1	·	1.9 km	MPC · JPL
581415	2015 GF_{48}	—	February 25, 2011	Kitt Peak	Spacewatch	·	1.1 km	MPC · JPL
581416	2015 GK_{48}	—	December 22, 2008	Kitt Peak	Spacewatch	·	2.1 km	MPC · JPL
581417	2015 GT_{48}	—	January 2, 2014	Kitt Peak	Spacewatch	·	2.4 km	MPC · JPL
581418	2015 GX_{48}	—	February 11, 2011	Mount Lemmon	Mount Lemmon Survey	·	980 m	MPC · JPL
581419	2015 GT_{52}	—	October 10, 2012	Mount Lemmon	Mount Lemmon Survey	·	2.2 km	MPC · JPL
581420	2015 GZ_{52}	—	November 7, 2012	Mount Lemmon	Mount Lemmon Survey	·	2.1 km	MPC · JPL
581421	2015 GN_{53}	—	April 13, 2015	Haleakala	Pan-STARRS 1	·	1.6 km	MPC · JPL
581422	2015 GC_{54}	—	April 4, 2015	Haleakala	Pan-STARRS 1	·	2.4 km	MPC · JPL
581423	2015 GJ_{61}	—	April 14, 2015	Mount Lemmon	Mount Lemmon Survey	H	390 m	MPC · JPL
581424	2015 GD_{62}	—	October 25, 2012	Kitt Peak	Spacewatch	KOR	1.2 km	MPC · JPL
581425	2015 GG_{63}	—	September 27, 2003	Kitt Peak	Spacewatch	·	1.6 km	MPC · JPL
581426	2015 HG_{2}	—	November 9, 2009	Kitt Peak	Spacewatch	·	2.1 km	MPC · JPL
581427	2015 HV_{3}	—	March 20, 2015	Haleakala	Pan-STARRS 1	·	1.7 km	MPC · JPL
581428	2015 HY_{3}	—	January 20, 2015	Haleakala	Pan-STARRS 1	·	2.4 km	MPC · JPL
581429	2015 HA_{4}	—	January 12, 2008	Mount Lemmon	Mount Lemmon Survey	·	3.1 km	MPC · JPL
581430	2015 HO_{4}	—	November 1, 2007	Kitt Peak	Spacewatch	EOS	1.6 km	MPC · JPL
581431	2015 HH_{5}	—	December 24, 2013	Mount Lemmon	Mount Lemmon Survey	·	1.6 km	MPC · JPL
581432	2015 HS_{6}	—	January 1, 2009	Kitt Peak	Spacewatch	·	2.0 km	MPC · JPL
581433	2015 HU_{6}	—	August 28, 2006	Kitt Peak	Spacewatch	·	2.5 km	MPC · JPL
581434	2015 HQ_{7}	—	September 23, 2008	Kitt Peak	Spacewatch	H	470 m	MPC · JPL
581435	2015 HT_{7}	—	February 7, 2011	Mount Lemmon	Mount Lemmon Survey	·	910 m	MPC · JPL
581436	2015 HQ_{8}	—	January 21, 2015	Haleakala	Pan-STARRS 1	·	2.3 km	MPC · JPL
581437	2015 HT_{8}	—	October 15, 2012	Haleakala	Pan-STARRS 1	TIN	970 m	MPC · JPL
581438	2015 HD_{11}	—	February 2, 2012	Catalina	CSS	H	580 m	MPC · JPL
581439	2015 HK_{12}	—	March 3, 2006	Kitt Peak	Spacewatch	·	1.3 km	MPC · JPL
581440	2015 HF_{18}	—	March 22, 2015	Haleakala	Pan-STARRS 1	·	1.7 km	MPC · JPL
581441	2015 HC_{20}	—	March 29, 2015	Haleakala	Pan-STARRS 1	·	2.3 km	MPC · JPL
581442	2015 HN_{20}	—	March 21, 2015	Mount Lemmon	Mount Lemmon Survey	EOS	1.5 km	MPC · JPL
581443	2015 HX_{20}	—	April 3, 2011	Haleakala	Pan-STARRS 1	PHO	690 m	MPC · JPL
581444	2015 HJ_{23}	—	January 16, 2009	Mount Lemmon	Mount Lemmon Survey	·	2.0 km	MPC · JPL
581445	2015 HT_{23}	—	October 8, 2012	Haleakala	Pan-STARRS 1	·	2.4 km	MPC · JPL
581446	2015 HL_{24}	—	October 16, 2012	Kitt Peak	Spacewatch	·	2.6 km	MPC · JPL
581447	2015 HH_{27}	—	October 18, 2012	Haleakala	Pan-STARRS 1	·	2.3 km	MPC · JPL
581448	2015 HF_{32}	—	October 20, 2003	Kitt Peak	Spacewatch	·	1.8 km	MPC · JPL
581449	2015 HC_{34}	—	April 20, 2015	Haleakala	Pan-STARRS 1	·	2.2 km	MPC · JPL
581450	2015 HE_{36}	—	October 22, 2012	Front Royal	Skillman, D.	·	1.8 km	MPC · JPL
581451	2015 HO_{36}	—	January 6, 2003	Kitt Peak	Deep Lens Survey	·	3.5 km	MPC · JPL
581452	2015 HU_{36}	—	March 21, 2015	Haleakala	Pan-STARRS 1	·	2.6 km	MPC · JPL
581453	2015 HS_{38}	—	February 19, 2009	Kitt Peak	Spacewatch	·	1.4 km	MPC · JPL
581454	2015 HD_{39}	—	March 28, 2015	Haleakala	Pan-STARRS 1	·	1.4 km	MPC · JPL
581455	2015 HG_{39}	—	April 20, 2015	Haleakala	Pan-STARRS 1	·	2.0 km	MPC · JPL
581456	2015 HM_{39}	—	March 16, 2005	Catalina	CSS	615	1.7 km	MPC · JPL
581457	2015 HQ_{39}	—	March 28, 2015	Haleakala	Pan-STARRS 1	EOS	1.4 km	MPC · JPL
581458	2015 HF_{40}	—	December 27, 2006	Mount Lemmon	Mount Lemmon Survey	·	990 m	MPC · JPL
581459	2015 HO_{40}	—	May 19, 2010	Mount Lemmon	Mount Lemmon Survey	·	2.0 km	MPC · JPL
581460	2015 HR_{45}	—	May 20, 2012	Mount Lemmon	Mount Lemmon Survey	V	620 m	MPC · JPL
581461	2015 HB_{47}	—	October 7, 2008	Mount Lemmon	Mount Lemmon Survey	·	1.5 km	MPC · JPL
581462	2015 HY_{50}	—	September 18, 2012	Catalina	CSS	·	1.9 km	MPC · JPL
581463	2015 HD_{53}	—	June 7, 2011	Mount Lemmon	Mount Lemmon Survey	·	2.1 km	MPC · JPL
581464	2015 HA_{55}	—	February 22, 2009	Catalina	CSS	·	3.3 km	MPC · JPL
581465	2015 HQ_{56}	—	April 18, 2015	Haleakala	Pan-STARRS 1	·	1.0 km	MPC · JPL
581466	2015 HK_{59}	—	September 18, 2006	Kitt Peak	Spacewatch	·	1.9 km	MPC · JPL
581467	2015 HK_{60}	—	March 18, 2010	Mount Lemmon	Mount Lemmon Survey	·	1.5 km	MPC · JPL
581468	2015 HY_{60}	—	February 1, 2009	Kitt Peak	Spacewatch	·	2.6 km	MPC · JPL
581469	2015 HA_{61}	—	April 18, 2015	Haleakala	Pan-STARRS 1	·	2.4 km	MPC · JPL
581470	2015 HD_{62}	—	June 19, 2010	Mount Lemmon	Mount Lemmon Survey	·	3.5 km	MPC · JPL
581471	2015 HP_{63}	—	March 22, 2001	Kitt Peak	Spacewatch	·	1.5 km	MPC · JPL
581472	2015 HM_{67}	—	March 4, 2011	Mount Lemmon	Mount Lemmon Survey	·	870 m	MPC · JPL
581473	2015 HT_{70}	—	October 1, 2005	Mount Lemmon	Mount Lemmon Survey	NYS	750 m	MPC · JPL
581474	2015 HJ_{71}	—	October 17, 2012	Haleakala	Pan-STARRS 1	·	910 m	MPC · JPL
581475	2015 HE_{72}	—	June 19, 2010	Mount Lemmon	Mount Lemmon Survey	THM	1.9 km	MPC · JPL
581476	2015 HO_{72}	—	October 9, 2007	Mount Lemmon	Mount Lemmon Survey	·	1.7 km	MPC · JPL
581477	2015 HG_{74}	—	September 17, 2006	Kitt Peak	Spacewatch	·	2.4 km	MPC · JPL
581478	2015 HJ_{74}	—	April 23, 2015	Haleakala	Pan-STARRS 1	·	1.4 km	MPC · JPL
581479	2015 HX_{75}	—	October 22, 2012	Haleakala	Pan-STARRS 1	·	2.6 km	MPC · JPL
581480	2015 HH_{76}	—	October 11, 2007	Mount Lemmon	Mount Lemmon Survey	·	1.5 km	MPC · JPL
581481	2015 HK_{76}	—	February 28, 2009	Kitt Peak	Spacewatch	THM	1.9 km	MPC · JPL
581482	2015 HT_{79}	—	October 8, 2012	Haleakala	Pan-STARRS 1	·	1.5 km	MPC · JPL
581483	2015 HW_{79}	—	March 12, 2005	Kitt Peak	Deep Ecliptic Survey	KOR	1.2 km	MPC · JPL
581484	2015 HN_{80}	—	October 18, 2012	Haleakala	Pan-STARRS 1	·	2.3 km	MPC · JPL
581485	2015 HS_{80}	—	September 17, 2012	Mount Lemmon	Mount Lemmon Survey	·	1.8 km	MPC · JPL
581486	2015 HE_{81}	—	October 2, 1995	Kitt Peak	Spacewatch	·	1.4 km	MPC · JPL
581487	2015 HR_{82}	—	April 10, 2010	Kitt Peak	Spacewatch	·	2.0 km	MPC · JPL
581488	2015 HA_{83}	—	April 14, 2010	Kitt Peak	Spacewatch	·	1.9 km	MPC · JPL
581489	2015 HB_{86}	—	August 29, 2006	Kitt Peak	Spacewatch	·	2.3 km	MPC · JPL
581490	2015 HQ_{86}	—	May 12, 2011	Nogales	M. Schwartz, P. R. Holvorcem	·	1.2 km	MPC · JPL
581491	2015 HY_{86}	—	October 18, 2012	Haleakala	Pan-STARRS 1	·	2.6 km	MPC · JPL
581492	2015 HD_{90}	—	April 23, 2015	Haleakala	Pan-STARRS 1	·	790 m	MPC · JPL
581493	2015 HD_{91}	—	July 1, 2011	Kitt Peak	Spacewatch	·	2.0 km	MPC · JPL
581494	2015 HA_{92}	—	October 23, 2006	Kitt Peak	Spacewatch	·	2.8 km	MPC · JPL
581495	2015 HJ_{92}	—	April 14, 2010	Kitt Peak	Spacewatch	·	1.7 km	MPC · JPL
581496	2015 HW_{93}	—	August 27, 2011	Haleakala	Pan-STARRS 1	·	1.8 km	MPC · JPL
581497	2015 HX_{93}	—	October 20, 2007	Mount Lemmon	Mount Lemmon Survey	·	2.9 km	MPC · JPL
581498	2015 HB_{94}	—	September 17, 2006	Kitt Peak	Spacewatch	·	2.5 km	MPC · JPL
581499	2015 HV_{94}	—	September 25, 2006	Kitt Peak	Spacewatch	·	1.9 km	MPC · JPL
581500	2015 HK_{95}	—	November 15, 2003	Kitt Peak	Spacewatch	·	1.7 km	MPC · JPL

== 581501–581600 ==
back to top

Designation			Discovery			Properties		Ref
Permanent	Provisional	Named after	Date	Site	Discoverer(s)	Category	Diam.	Ref
581501	2015 HB_{96}	—	March 12, 2007	Kitt Peak	Spacewatch	·	880 m	MPC · JPL
581502	2015 HW_{97}	—	March 17, 2015	Haleakala	Pan-STARRS 1	VER	2.3 km	MPC · JPL
581503	2015 HE_{98}	—	October 20, 2006	Kitt Peak	Spacewatch	·	2.6 km	MPC · JPL
581504	2015 HQ_{100}	—	September 15, 2007	Mount Lemmon	Mount Lemmon Survey	AGN	1.0 km	MPC · JPL
581505	2015 HF_{101}	—	January 31, 2015	Haleakala	Pan-STARRS 1	·	2.4 km	MPC · JPL
581506	2015 HK_{102}	—	November 2, 2007	Mount Lemmon	Mount Lemmon Survey	KOR	1.1 km	MPC · JPL
581507	2015 HW_{103}	—	January 25, 2009	Kitt Peak	Spacewatch	EOS	1.5 km	MPC · JPL
581508	2015 HC_{104}	—	January 3, 2014	Kitt Peak	Spacewatch	·	1.8 km	MPC · JPL
581509	2015 HW_{104}	—	February 23, 2015	Haleakala	Pan-STARRS 1	·	1.8 km	MPC · JPL
581510	2015 HR_{105}	—	April 13, 2015	Haleakala	Pan-STARRS 1	·	2.1 km	MPC · JPL
581511	2015 HG_{108}	—	February 18, 2009	La Sagra	OAM	·	1.9 km	MPC · JPL
581512	2015 HA_{109}	—	April 16, 2015	Haleakala	Pan-STARRS 2	615	1.0 km	MPC · JPL
581513	2015 HH_{109}	—	January 10, 2014	Mount Lemmon	Mount Lemmon Survey	·	2.3 km	MPC · JPL
581514	2015 HY_{109}	—	March 6, 2014	Mount Lemmon	Mount Lemmon Survey	·	2.1 km	MPC · JPL
581515	2015 HM_{110}	—	December 20, 2009	Mount Lemmon	Mount Lemmon Survey	·	1.4 km	MPC · JPL
581516	2015 HM_{112}	—	March 28, 2015	Haleakala	Pan-STARRS 1	·	2.0 km	MPC · JPL
581517	2015 HN_{112}	—	January 1, 2014	Mount Lemmon	Mount Lemmon Survey	·	1.9 km	MPC · JPL
581518	2015 HO_{112}	—	March 28, 2015	Haleakala	Pan-STARRS 1	EOS	1.4 km	MPC · JPL
581519	2015 HH_{113}	—	November 12, 2013	Mount Lemmon	Mount Lemmon Survey	·	2.1 km	MPC · JPL
581520	2015 HK_{113}	—	April 13, 2015	Haleakala	Pan-STARRS 1	·	1.4 km	MPC · JPL
581521	2015 HU_{114}	—	November 2, 2012	Haleakala	Pan-STARRS 1	·	1.9 km	MPC · JPL
581522	2015 HM_{115}	—	October 23, 2001	Anderson Mesa	LONEOS	·	3.4 km	MPC · JPL
581523	2015 HJ_{117}	—	October 29, 2005	Catalina	CSS	H	410 m	MPC · JPL
581524	2015 HK_{117}	—	September 5, 2013	Črni Vrh	Vales, J.	H	560 m	MPC · JPL
581525	2015 HU_{119}	—	April 23, 2015	Haleakala	Pan-STARRS 1	·	1.4 km	MPC · JPL
581526	2015 HZ_{119}	—	October 9, 2012	Mount Lemmon	Mount Lemmon Survey	·	1.8 km	MPC · JPL
581527	2015 HD_{123}	—	January 29, 2014	Mount Lemmon	Mount Lemmon Survey	·	1.8 km	MPC · JPL
581528	2015 HG_{125}	—	October 8, 2007	Kitt Peak	Spacewatch	KOR	1.1 km	MPC · JPL
581529	2015 HP_{127}	—	November 22, 2012	Kitt Peak	Spacewatch	·	1.2 km	MPC · JPL
581530	2015 HO_{129}	—	October 21, 2012	Mount Lemmon	Mount Lemmon Survey	·	2.2 km	MPC · JPL
581531	2015 HZ_{129}	—	September 16, 2012	Kitt Peak	Spacewatch	AGN	880 m	MPC · JPL
581532	2015 HF_{136}	—	April 2, 2011	Kitt Peak	Spacewatch	PHO	830 m	MPC · JPL
581533	2015 HL_{136}	—	October 30, 2005	Mount Lemmon	Mount Lemmon Survey	·	2.0 km	MPC · JPL
581534	2015 HP_{136}	—	April 23, 2015	Haleakala	Pan-STARRS 1	·	1 km	MPC · JPL
581535	2015 HZ_{140}	—	April 23, 2015	Haleakala	Pan-STARRS 1	·	1.4 km	MPC · JPL
581536	2015 HG_{142}	—	January 22, 2015	Haleakala	Pan-STARRS 1	·	2.0 km	MPC · JPL
581537	2015 HR_{142}	—	January 20, 2009	Kitt Peak	Spacewatch	KOR	1.2 km	MPC · JPL
581538	2015 HA_{145}	—	January 31, 2009	Mount Lemmon	Mount Lemmon Survey	·	1.7 km	MPC · JPL
581539	2015 HU_{145}	—	December 4, 2007	Mount Lemmon	Mount Lemmon Survey	VER	2.7 km	MPC · JPL
581540	2015 HN_{147}	—	September 18, 2012	Mount Lemmon	Mount Lemmon Survey	·	1.8 km	MPC · JPL
581541	2015 HV_{147}	—	February 2, 2009	Mount Lemmon	Mount Lemmon Survey	·	1.8 km	MPC · JPL
581542	2015 HW_{148}	—	December 5, 2007	Mount Lemmon	Mount Lemmon Survey	TIR	2.0 km	MPC · JPL
581543	2015 HZ_{153}	—	November 16, 2006	Kitt Peak	Spacewatch	HYG	2.5 km	MPC · JPL
581544	2015 HF_{154}	—	September 19, 2001	Apache Point	SDSS	EOS	2.3 km	MPC · JPL
581545	2015 HO_{154}	—	January 23, 2015	Haleakala	Pan-STARRS 1	·	1.6 km	MPC · JPL
581546	2015 HV_{154}	—	October 18, 2012	Haleakala	Pan-STARRS 1	·	1.1 km	MPC · JPL
581547	2015 HH_{157}	—	June 12, 2011	Mount Lemmon	Mount Lemmon Survey	·	2.0 km	MPC · JPL
581548	2015 HR_{158}	—	October 8, 2012	Kitt Peak	Spacewatch	·	1.6 km	MPC · JPL
581549	2015 HT_{163}	—	June 3, 2011	Mount Lemmon	Mount Lemmon Survey	·	1.4 km	MPC · JPL
581550	2015 HA_{164}	—	March 11, 2007	Mount Lemmon	Mount Lemmon Survey	·	860 m	MPC · JPL
581551	2015 HK_{167}	—	April 24, 2015	Haleakala	Pan-STARRS 1	EOS	1.4 km	MPC · JPL
581552	2015 HX_{168}	—	April 24, 2015	Haleakala	Pan-STARRS 2	·	800 m	MPC · JPL
581553	2015 HK_{170}	—	October 3, 2005	Palomar	NEAT	H	610 m	MPC · JPL
581554	2015 HP_{170}	—	May 6, 2003	Kitt Peak	Spacewatch	L4	10 km	MPC · JPL
581555	2015 HU_{170}	—	April 1, 2015	Haleakala	Pan-STARRS 1	·	2.3 km	MPC · JPL
581556	2015 HJ_{173}	—	June 27, 2005	Kitt Peak	Spacewatch	·	4.4 km	MPC · JPL
581557	2015 HH_{174}	—	January 29, 2009	Mount Lemmon	Mount Lemmon Survey	·	2.3 km	MPC · JPL
581558	2015 HS_{174}	—	March 15, 2004	Palomar	NEAT	·	3.3 km	MPC · JPL
581559	2015 HH_{176}	—	March 17, 2015	Haleakala	Pan-STARRS 1	TIR	2.2 km	MPC · JPL
581560	2015 HK_{176}	—	January 28, 2015	Haleakala	Pan-STARRS 1	·	1.9 km	MPC · JPL
581561	2015 HT_{178}	—	November 9, 2007	Kitt Peak	Spacewatch	EOS	1.7 km	MPC · JPL
581562	2015 HH_{180}	—	April 22, 2015	Space Surveillance	Space Surveillance Telescope	·	1.2 km	MPC · JPL
581563	2015 HR_{180}	—	October 25, 2001	Apache Point	SDSS	·	1.1 km	MPC · JPL
581564	2015 HE_{182}	—	November 17, 2011	Kitt Peak	Spacewatch	L4	10 km	MPC · JPL
581565	2015 HF_{184}	—	February 19, 2012	Catalina	CSS	H	550 m	MPC · JPL
581566	2015 HK_{186}	—	April 2, 2009	Kitt Peak	Spacewatch	VER	2.3 km	MPC · JPL
581567	2015 HV_{186}	—	April 18, 2015	Haleakala	Pan-STARRS 1	·	2.8 km	MPC · JPL
581568	2015 HB_{187}	—	December 30, 2007	Mount Lemmon	Mount Lemmon Survey	·	2.8 km	MPC · JPL
581569	2015 HP_{187}	—	January 31, 2009	Mount Lemmon	Mount Lemmon Survey	·	1.4 km	MPC · JPL
581570	2015 HW_{187}	—	April 25, 2015	Haleakala	Pan-STARRS 1	·	1.6 km	MPC · JPL
581571	2015 HV_{189}	—	July 4, 2005	Mount Lemmon	Mount Lemmon Survey	·	1.7 km	MPC · JPL
581572	2015 HE_{192}	—	April 23, 2015	Haleakala	Pan-STARRS 1	EOS	1.6 km	MPC · JPL
581573	2015 HF_{192}	—	April 23, 2015	Haleakala	Pan-STARRS 1	EOS	1.4 km	MPC · JPL
581574	2015 HE_{194}	—	December 14, 2012	Charleston	R. Holmes	·	2.2 km	MPC · JPL
581575	2015 HO_{199}	—	April 25, 2015	Haleakala	Pan-STARRS 1	·	2.3 km	MPC · JPL
581576	2015 HP_{199}	—	June 29, 2016	Haleakala	Pan-STARRS 1	·	1.8 km	MPC · JPL
581577	2015 HJ_{200}	—	April 25, 2015	Haleakala	Pan-STARRS 1	EOS	1.1 km	MPC · JPL
581578	2015 HQ_{200}	—	April 25, 2015	Haleakala	Pan-STARRS 1	·	1.4 km	MPC · JPL
581579	2015 HX_{205}	—	April 24, 2015	Haleakala	Pan-STARRS 1	·	1.8 km	MPC · JPL
581580	2015 HB_{206}	—	April 23, 2015	Haleakala	Pan-STARRS 1	·	1.6 km	MPC · JPL
581581	2015 HC_{208}	—	April 24, 2015	Haleakala	Pan-STARRS 1	EOS	1.3 km	MPC · JPL
581582	2015 HF_{208}	—	April 25, 2015	Haleakala	Pan-STARRS 1	·	2.4 km	MPC · JPL
581583	2015 HG_{208}	—	April 23, 2015	Haleakala	Pan-STARRS 1	·	1.9 km	MPC · JPL
581584	2015 HP_{208}	—	April 23, 2015	Haleakala	Pan-STARRS 1	·	490 m	MPC · JPL
581585	2015 HG_{209}	—	April 25, 2015	Haleakala	Pan-STARRS 1	·	1.4 km	MPC · JPL
581586	2015 HV_{209}	—	April 23, 2015	Haleakala	Pan-STARRS 1	EOS	1.4 km	MPC · JPL
581587 Pazmany	2015 HX_{210}	Pazmany	April 23, 2015	La Palma	EURONEAR	·	1.4 km	MPC · JPL
581588	2015 HT_{211}	—	April 20, 2015	Kitt Peak	Spacewatch	·	1.5 km	MPC · JPL
581589	2015 HW_{211}	—	April 24, 2015	Haleakala	Pan-STARRS 1	HNS	1.0 km	MPC · JPL
581590	2015 HU_{218}	—	April 18, 2015	Haleakala	Pan-STARRS 1	V	550 m	MPC · JPL
581591	2015 JE_{1}	—	November 3, 2013	Palomar	Palomar Transient Factory	H	560 m	MPC · JPL
581592	2015 JA_{3}	—	April 26, 2011	Haleakala	Pan-STARRS 1	·	1.2 km	MPC · JPL
581593	2015 JN_{3}	—	November 17, 2006	Kitt Peak	Spacewatch	·	3.7 km	MPC · JPL
581594	2015 JY_{3}	—	May 15, 2015	Haleakala	Pan-STARRS 1	·	2.0 km	MPC · JPL
581595	2015 JC_{4}	—	June 24, 2011	Kitt Peak	Spacewatch	·	2.0 km	MPC · JPL
581596	2015 JG_{4}	—	November 11, 2013	Mount Lemmon	Mount Lemmon Survey	·	1.8 km	MPC · JPL
581597	2015 JD_{5}	—	March 3, 2009	Mount Lemmon	Mount Lemmon Survey	EOS	1.7 km	MPC · JPL
581598	2015 JN_{6}	—	May 30, 2011	Haleakala	Pan-STARRS 1	·	1.2 km	MPC · JPL
581599	2015 JV_{7}	—	January 1, 2014	Mount Lemmon	Mount Lemmon Survey	·	2.2 km	MPC · JPL
581600	2015 JR_{8}	—	February 9, 2005	Mount Lemmon	Mount Lemmon Survey	·	2.4 km	MPC · JPL

== 581601–581700 ==
back to top

Designation			Discovery			Properties		Ref
Permanent	Provisional	Named after	Date	Site	Discoverer(s)	Category	Diam.	Ref
581601	2015 JZ_{9}	—	January 26, 2014	Haleakala	Pan-STARRS 1	·	2.6 km	MPC · JPL
581602	2015 JJ_{12}	—	April 21, 2004	Kitt Peak	Spacewatch	·	2.1 km	MPC · JPL
581603	2015 JE_{14}	—	May 13, 2015	Haleakala	Pan-STARRS 1	·	1.6 km	MPC · JPL
581604	2015 JU_{15}	—	May 14, 2015	Haleakala	Pan-STARRS 1	·	2.3 km	MPC · JPL
581605	2015 JJ_{18}	—	May 10, 2015	Mount Lemmon	Mount Lemmon Survey	URS	2.7 km	MPC · JPL
581606	2015 JR_{19}	—	May 11, 2015	Mount Lemmon	Mount Lemmon Survey	EOS	1.5 km	MPC · JPL
581607	2015 JY_{19}	—	May 12, 2015	Mount Lemmon	Mount Lemmon Survey	·	1.6 km	MPC · JPL
581608	2015 JF_{22}	—	May 12, 2015	Mount Lemmon	Mount Lemmon Survey	·	1.1 km	MPC · JPL
581609	2015 KP_{1}	—	October 18, 2012	Haleakala	Pan-STARRS 1	·	2.2 km	MPC · JPL
581610	2015 KW_{2}	—	December 14, 2013	Mount Lemmon	Mount Lemmon Survey	·	2.7 km	MPC · JPL
581611	2015 KM_{3}	—	October 14, 2001	Kitt Peak	Spacewatch	·	1.2 km	MPC · JPL
581612	2015 KZ_{3}	—	October 3, 2008	Mount Lemmon	Mount Lemmon Survey	·	2.5 km	MPC · JPL
581613	2015 KK_{4}	—	January 18, 2015	Haleakala	Pan-STARRS 1	·	2.0 km	MPC · JPL
581614	2015 KJ_{5}	—	May 9, 2015	Haleakala	Pan-STARRS 2	·	2.8 km	MPC · JPL
581615	2015 KT_{5}	—	September 24, 2011	Haleakala	Pan-STARRS 1	·	2.3 km	MPC · JPL
581616	2015 KU_{5}	—	November 9, 2007	Kitt Peak	Spacewatch	·	2.3 km	MPC · JPL
581617	2015 KQ_{6}	—	December 4, 2012	Mount Lemmon	Mount Lemmon Survey	EOS	1.5 km	MPC · JPL
581618	2015 KR_{7}	—	April 23, 2015	Haleakala	Pan-STARRS 2	·	1.9 km	MPC · JPL
581619	2015 KO_{13}	—	September 17, 2003	Kitt Peak	Spacewatch	EUN	790 m	MPC · JPL
581620	2015 KD_{15}	—	May 18, 2015	Haleakala	Pan-STARRS 1	·	2.5 km	MPC · JPL
581621	2015 KL_{15}	—	May 14, 2015	Haleakala	Pan-STARRS 1	·	950 m	MPC · JPL
581622	2015 KV_{15}	—	October 23, 2011	Haleakala	Pan-STARRS 1	·	3.5 km	MPC · JPL
581623	2015 KO_{16}	—	May 18, 2015	Haleakala	Pan-STARRS 1	EOS	1.6 km	MPC · JPL
581624	2015 KQ_{16}	—	August 30, 2011	Kitt Peak	Spacewatch	EOS	1.5 km	MPC · JPL
581625	2015 KM_{17}	—	February 22, 2014	Kitt Peak	Spacewatch	·	2.0 km	MPC · JPL
581626	2015 KR_{18}	—	December 2, 2008	Kitt Peak	Spacewatch	H	450 m	MPC · JPL
581627	2015 KO_{19}	—	May 27, 2009	Palomar	Palomar Transient Factory	TIR	3.6 km	MPC · JPL
581628	2015 KD_{21}	—	July 18, 2005	Palomar	NEAT	·	2.1 km	MPC · JPL
581629	2015 KL_{21}	—	March 23, 2003	Apache Point	SDSS Collaboration	·	2.9 km	MPC · JPL
581630	2015 KN_{21}	—	June 30, 2005	Palomar	NEAT	·	2.4 km	MPC · JPL
581631	2015 KF_{22}	—	April 29, 2009	Mount Lemmon	Mount Lemmon Survey	·	2.7 km	MPC · JPL
581632	2015 KL_{22}	—	April 1, 2003	Palomar	NEAT	·	3.5 km	MPC · JPL
581633	2015 KP_{22}	—	April 20, 2015	Haleakala	Pan-STARRS 1	·	2.6 km	MPC · JPL
581634	2015 KW_{22}	—	January 11, 2008	Kitt Peak	Spacewatch	·	2.2 km	MPC · JPL
581635	2015 KV_{23}	—	May 18, 2015	Haleakala	Pan-STARRS 1	·	1.3 km	MPC · JPL
581636	2015 KN_{24}	—	January 13, 2008	Mount Lemmon	Mount Lemmon Survey	·	2.5 km	MPC · JPL
581637	2015 KO_{27}	—	December 31, 2013	Kitt Peak	Spacewatch	·	1.6 km	MPC · JPL
581638	2015 KV_{27}	—	October 9, 2008	Mount Lemmon	Mount Lemmon Survey	L4	9.5 km	MPC · JPL
581639	2015 KZ_{28}	—	April 18, 2015	Haleakala	Pan-STARRS 1	·	2.8 km	MPC · JPL
581640	2015 KG_{29}	—	May 19, 2015	Haleakala	Pan-STARRS 1	·	1.6 km	MPC · JPL
581641	2015 KW_{31}	—	April 18, 2015	Mount Lemmon	Mount Lemmon Survey	·	1.5 km	MPC · JPL
581642	2015 KG_{32}	—	October 22, 2012	Haleakala	Pan-STARRS 1	EOS	1.3 km	MPC · JPL
581643	2015 KL_{33}	—	February 10, 2014	Haleakala	Pan-STARRS 1	EOS	1.7 km	MPC · JPL
581644	2015 KV_{34}	—	November 4, 2007	Kitt Peak	Spacewatch	·	2.0 km	MPC · JPL
581645	2015 KO_{36}	—	May 19, 2015	Haleakala	Pan-STARRS 1	·	1.9 km	MPC · JPL
581646	2015 KU_{38}	—	August 5, 2011	Piszkés-tető	K. Sárneczky, A. Pál	EOS	2.3 km	MPC · JPL
581647	2015 KP_{39}	—	July 9, 2005	Kitt Peak	Spacewatch	·	2.2 km	MPC · JPL
581648	2015 KW_{41}	—	November 9, 2007	Kitt Peak	Spacewatch	·	1.8 km	MPC · JPL
581649	2015 KX_{41}	—	December 16, 2007	Mount Lemmon	Mount Lemmon Survey	TEL	1.2 km	MPC · JPL
581650	2015 KB_{42}	—	May 9, 2004	Kitt Peak	Spacewatch	·	3.3 km	MPC · JPL
581651	2015 KR_{42}	—	August 26, 2011	Piszkéstető	K. Sárneczky	EOS	1.7 km	MPC · JPL
581652	2015 KZ_{45}	—	October 6, 2012	Mount Lemmon	Mount Lemmon Survey	MAS	530 m	MPC · JPL
581653	2015 KG_{46}	—	May 20, 2015	Haleakala	Pan-STARRS 1	·	1.5 km	MPC · JPL
581654	2015 KE_{47}	—	April 27, 2009	Mount Lemmon	Mount Lemmon Survey	·	2.1 km	MPC · JPL
581655	2015 KK_{47}	—	March 21, 2015	Haleakala	Pan-STARRS 1	·	1.1 km	MPC · JPL
581656	2015 KT_{47}	—	May 20, 2015	Haleakala	Pan-STARRS 1	·	2.5 km	MPC · JPL
581657	2015 KX_{48}	—	May 20, 2015	Haleakala	Pan-STARRS 1	·	920 m	MPC · JPL
581658	2015 KT_{49}	—	March 13, 2014	Mount Lemmon	Mount Lemmon Survey	·	2.7 km	MPC · JPL
581659	2015 KF_{50}	—	May 20, 2015	Haleakala	Pan-STARRS 1	(5)	1.2 km	MPC · JPL
581660	2015 KG_{50}	—	May 20, 2015	Haleakala	Pan-STARRS 1	·	1.4 km	MPC · JPL
581661	2015 KY_{50}	—	October 17, 2012	Mount Lemmon	Mount Lemmon Survey	BRA	1.8 km	MPC · JPL
581662	2015 KB_{51}	—	September 29, 2011	Mount Lemmon	Mount Lemmon Survey	·	2.0 km	MPC · JPL
581663	2015 KK_{52}	—	April 4, 2005	Mount Lemmon	Mount Lemmon Survey	·	2.1 km	MPC · JPL
581664	2015 KR_{52}	—	December 30, 2007	Mount Lemmon	Mount Lemmon Survey	·	2.2 km	MPC · JPL
581665	2015 KJ_{53}	—	May 20, 2015	Haleakala	Pan-STARRS 1	EOS	1.7 km	MPC · JPL
581666	2015 KH_{54}	—	May 20, 2015	Haleakala	Pan-STARRS 1	·	1.8 km	MPC · JPL
581667	2015 KK_{54}	—	March 30, 2015	Haleakala	Pan-STARRS 1	MAR	700 m	MPC · JPL
581668	2015 KM_{55}	—	June 12, 2011	Mount Lemmon	Mount Lemmon Survey	EOS	2.3 km	MPC · JPL
581669	2015 KS_{55}	—	May 20, 2015	Haleakala	Pan-STARRS 1	·	2.1 km	MPC · JPL
581670	2015 KS_{60}	—	November 4, 2007	Kitt Peak	Spacewatch	·	1.5 km	MPC · JPL
581671	2015 KQ_{61}	—	March 28, 2015	Haleakala	Pan-STARRS 1	·	2.7 km	MPC · JPL
581672	2015 KZ_{62}	—	February 1, 2009	Mount Lemmon	Mount Lemmon Survey	EOS	1.5 km	MPC · JPL
581673	2015 KB_{65}	—	May 11, 2010	Mount Lemmon	Mount Lemmon Survey	·	1.6 km	MPC · JPL
581674	2015 KK_{65}	—	March 2, 2009	Kitt Peak	Spacewatch	EOS	1.9 km	MPC · JPL
581675	2015 KZ_{67}	—	May 21, 2015	Haleakala	Pan-STARRS 1	·	2.4 km	MPC · JPL
581676	2015 KB_{68}	—	May 11, 2015	Mount Lemmon	Mount Lemmon Survey	·	1.3 km	MPC · JPL
581677	2015 KP_{68}	—	May 21, 2015	Haleakala	Pan-STARRS 1	·	1.9 km	MPC · JPL
581678	2015 KY_{68}	—	April 28, 2015	Catalina	CSS	·	2.8 km	MPC · JPL
581679	2015 KB_{69}	—	December 31, 2007	Mount Lemmon	Mount Lemmon Survey	EOS	1.7 km	MPC · JPL
581680	2015 KK_{69}	—	May 21, 2015	Haleakala	Pan-STARRS 1	MAR	660 m	MPC · JPL
581681	2015 KS_{69}	—	July 3, 2005	Mount Lemmon	Mount Lemmon Survey	EOS	1.8 km	MPC · JPL
581682	2015 KL_{70}	—	August 27, 2011	Haleakala	Pan-STARRS 1	·	1.5 km	MPC · JPL
581683	2015 KV_{70}	—	May 21, 2015	Haleakala	Pan-STARRS 1	·	1.5 km	MPC · JPL
581684	2015 KX_{70}	—	March 3, 2009	Mount Lemmon	Mount Lemmon Survey	EOS	1.3 km	MPC · JPL
581685	2015 KD_{72}	—	May 21, 2015	Haleakala	Pan-STARRS 1	·	1.7 km	MPC · JPL
581686	2015 KU_{72}	—	September 21, 2011	Mount Lemmon	Mount Lemmon Survey	·	2.5 km	MPC · JPL
581687	2015 KF_{76}	—	January 25, 2014	Haleakala	Pan-STARRS 1	·	1.3 km	MPC · JPL
581688	2015 KT_{76}	—	February 25, 2014	Kitt Peak	Spacewatch	·	2.3 km	MPC · JPL
581689	2015 KF_{77}	—	April 23, 2015	Haleakala	Pan-STARRS 1	BRA	1.3 km	MPC · JPL
581690	2015 KV_{78}	—	April 23, 2015	Haleakala	Pan-STARRS 1	·	1.4 km	MPC · JPL
581691	2015 KY_{78}	—	May 21, 2015	Haleakala	Pan-STARRS 1	·	1.5 km	MPC · JPL
581692	2015 KO_{79}	—	November 13, 2006	Catalina	CSS	·	4.2 km	MPC · JPL
581693	2015 KO_{80}	—	September 25, 2011	Haleakala	Pan-STARRS 1	·	2.1 km	MPC · JPL
581694	2015 KA_{81}	—	August 28, 2006	Kitt Peak	Spacewatch	·	1.4 km	MPC · JPL
581695	2015 KS_{81}	—	February 28, 2009	Kitt Peak	Spacewatch	·	1.7 km	MPC · JPL
581696	2015 KA_{82}	—	January 30, 2009	Mount Lemmon	Mount Lemmon Survey	·	1.7 km	MPC · JPL
581697	2015 KZ_{82}	—	May 21, 2015	Haleakala	Pan-STARRS 1	·	1.6 km	MPC · JPL
581698	2015 KF_{83}	—	February 26, 2014	Mount Lemmon	Mount Lemmon Survey	·	3.3 km	MPC · JPL
581699	2015 KP_{83}	—	December 12, 2012	Mount Lemmon	Mount Lemmon Survey	·	1.5 km	MPC · JPL
581700	2015 KD_{84}	—	May 21, 2015	Haleakala	Pan-STARRS 1	·	2.4 km	MPC · JPL

== 581701–581800 ==
back to top

Designation			Discovery			Properties		Ref
Permanent	Provisional	Named after	Date	Site	Discoverer(s)	Category	Diam.	Ref
581701	2015 KM_{84}	—	January 17, 2008	Mount Lemmon	Mount Lemmon Survey	·	3.0 km	MPC · JPL
581702	2015 KP_{84}	—	March 28, 2015	Haleakala	Pan-STARRS 1	·	1.3 km	MPC · JPL
581703	2015 KF_{85}	—	December 31, 2007	Mount Lemmon	Mount Lemmon Survey	VER	2.4 km	MPC · JPL
581704	2015 KT_{87}	—	December 4, 2012	Mount Lemmon	Mount Lemmon Survey	·	1.7 km	MPC · JPL
581705	2015 KZ_{87}	—	March 31, 2015	Haleakala	Pan-STARRS 1	·	2.5 km	MPC · JPL
581706	2015 KB_{88}	—	January 31, 2009	Mount Lemmon	Mount Lemmon Survey	·	1.5 km	MPC · JPL
581707	2015 KT_{88}	—	May 21, 2015	Haleakala	Pan-STARRS 1	ELF	2.7 km	MPC · JPL
581708	2015 KV_{88}	—	May 21, 2015	Haleakala	Pan-STARRS 1	·	2.5 km	MPC · JPL
581709	2015 KX_{88}	—	March 28, 2015	Haleakala	Pan-STARRS 1	NAE	2.0 km	MPC · JPL
581710	2015 KW_{89}	—	February 20, 2009	Kitt Peak	Spacewatch	·	1.9 km	MPC · JPL
581711	2015 KG_{90}	—	March 7, 2003	Kitt Peak	Deep Lens Survey	EOS	1.4 km	MPC · JPL
581712	2015 KH_{92}	—	April 23, 2015	Haleakala	Pan-STARRS 1	EOS	1.4 km	MPC · JPL
581713	2015 KJ_{94}	—	May 13, 2015	Mount Lemmon	Mount Lemmon Survey	·	2.3 km	MPC · JPL
581714	2015 KP_{94}	—	May 13, 2015	Mount Lemmon	Mount Lemmon Survey	EOS	1.2 km	MPC · JPL
581715	2015 KN_{95}	—	October 10, 2002	Palomar	NEAT	·	2.1 km	MPC · JPL
581716	2015 KS_{95}	—	April 23, 2015	Haleakala	Pan-STARRS 1	·	1.7 km	MPC · JPL
581717	2015 KR_{96}	—	October 22, 1995	Kitt Peak	Spacewatch	·	1.7 km	MPC · JPL
581718	2015 KF_{97}	—	March 21, 2015	Haleakala	Pan-STARRS 1	·	2.3 km	MPC · JPL
581719	2015 KO_{97}	—	April 23, 2015	Haleakala	Pan-STARRS 1	EOS	1.2 km	MPC · JPL
581720	2015 KM_{98}	—	March 29, 2009	Kitt Peak	Spacewatch	·	2.0 km	MPC · JPL
581721	2015 KA_{99}	—	December 3, 2012	Mount Lemmon	Mount Lemmon Survey	·	2.3 km	MPC · JPL
581722	2015 KH_{101}	—	October 21, 2008	Mount Lemmon	Mount Lemmon Survey	·	850 m	MPC · JPL
581723	2015 KK_{101}	—	March 30, 2015	Haleakala	Pan-STARRS 1	·	2.4 km	MPC · JPL
581724	2015 KM_{101}	—	March 12, 2004	Palomar	NEAT	·	2.1 km	MPC · JPL
581725	2015 KZ_{101}	—	January 26, 2014	Haleakala	Pan-STARRS 1	·	1.8 km	MPC · JPL
581726	2015 KK_{102}	—	September 15, 1998	Kitt Peak	Spacewatch	·	1.4 km	MPC · JPL
581727	2015 KD_{103}	—	May 21, 2015	Haleakala	Pan-STARRS 1	·	1.7 km	MPC · JPL
581728	2015 KL_{104}	—	February 26, 2014	Mount Lemmon	Mount Lemmon Survey	EOS	1.8 km	MPC · JPL
581729	2015 KQ_{104}	—	March 10, 2008	Kitt Peak	Spacewatch	·	2.8 km	MPC · JPL
581730	2015 KU_{104}	—	February 26, 2014	Mount Lemmon	Mount Lemmon Survey	EOS	1.7 km	MPC · JPL
581731	2015 KW_{104}	—	April 21, 2006	Kitt Peak	Spacewatch	·	1.2 km	MPC · JPL
581732	2015 KX_{104}	—	April 19, 2009	Mount Lemmon	Mount Lemmon Survey	EOS	1.5 km	MPC · JPL
581733	2015 KX_{105}	—	December 4, 2012	Mount Lemmon	Mount Lemmon Survey	·	2.3 km	MPC · JPL
581734	2015 KY_{105}	—	September 30, 2006	Mount Lemmon	Mount Lemmon Survey	EOS	2.0 km	MPC · JPL
581735	2015 KW_{106}	—	March 30, 2015	Haleakala	Pan-STARRS 1	·	1.1 km	MPC · JPL
581736	2015 KO_{107}	—	May 21, 2015	Haleakala	Pan-STARRS 1	MAR	660 m	MPC · JPL
581737	2015 KP_{107}	—	May 21, 2015	Haleakala	Pan-STARRS 1	·	780 m	MPC · JPL
581738	2015 KA_{108}	—	November 11, 2007	Mount Lemmon	Mount Lemmon Survey	EOS	1.8 km	MPC · JPL
581739	2015 KF_{108}	—	May 18, 2015	Mount Lemmon	Mount Lemmon Survey	·	2.2 km	MPC · JPL
581740	2015 KK_{109}	—	May 21, 2015	Haleakala	Pan-STARRS 1	TEL	1.0 km	MPC · JPL
581741	2015 KV_{109}	—	May 21, 2015	Haleakala	Pan-STARRS 1	·	2.2 km	MPC · JPL
581742	2015 KG_{110}	—	May 9, 2005	Kitt Peak	Spacewatch	·	2.5 km	MPC · JPL
581743	2015 KJ_{110}	—	December 4, 2007	Mount Lemmon	Mount Lemmon Survey	EOS	2.1 km	MPC · JPL
581744	2015 KF_{111}	—	September 24, 2011	Haleakala	Pan-STARRS 1	·	2.5 km	MPC · JPL
581745	2015 KF_{112}	—	April 1, 2009	Mount Lemmon	Mount Lemmon Survey	·	2.4 km	MPC · JPL
581746	2015 KP_{112}	—	May 14, 2015	Haleakala	Pan-STARRS 1	·	2.1 km	MPC · JPL
581747	2015 KB_{113}	—	March 30, 2015	Haleakala	Pan-STARRS 1	·	1.5 km	MPC · JPL
581748	2015 KF_{114}	—	May 15, 2004	Campo Imperatore	CINEOS	·	1.9 km	MPC · JPL
581749	2015 KO_{114}	—	May 21, 2015	Haleakala	Pan-STARRS 1	·	2.3 km	MPC · JPL
581750	2015 KR_{115}	—	November 11, 2001	Apache Point	SDSS Collaboration	·	1.8 km	MPC · JPL
581751	2015 KR_{117}	—	January 30, 2008	Kitt Peak	Spacewatch	EMA	2.9 km	MPC · JPL
581752	2015 KM_{118}	—	October 8, 2007	Mount Bigelow	CSS	·	2.2 km	MPC · JPL
581753	2015 KA_{119}	—	October 19, 2012	Mount Lemmon	Mount Lemmon Survey	·	2.3 km	MPC · JPL
581754	2015 KG_{119}	—	March 28, 2015	Haleakala	Pan-STARRS 1	·	2.9 km	MPC · JPL
581755	2015 KH_{119}	—	January 31, 2009	Kitt Peak	Spacewatch	·	2.3 km	MPC · JPL
581756	2015 KN_{119}	—	April 18, 2015	Haleakala	Pan-STARRS 1	·	1.4 km	MPC · JPL
581757	2015 KG_{123}	—	May 21, 2015	Haleakala	Pan-STARRS 2	·	2.4 km	MPC · JPL
581758	2015 KB_{126}	—	April 25, 2015	Haleakala	Pan-STARRS 1	·	1.1 km	MPC · JPL
581759	2015 KW_{127}	—	October 22, 2006	Catalina	CSS	EOS	2.1 km	MPC · JPL
581760	2015 KT_{128}	—	May 10, 2015	Mount Lemmon	Mount Lemmon Survey	·	2.2 km	MPC · JPL
581761	2015 KL_{129}	—	April 10, 2015	Mount Lemmon	Mount Lemmon Survey	·	1.5 km	MPC · JPL
581762	2015 KQ_{129}	—	August 21, 2006	Piszkéstető	K. Sárneczky, Kuli, Z.	KOR	1.6 km	MPC · JPL
581763	2015 KT_{129}	—	April 11, 2015	Mount Lemmon	Mount Lemmon Survey	·	2.1 km	MPC · JPL
581764	2015 KJ_{132}	—	May 22, 2015	Haleakala	Pan-STARRS 1	·	700 m	MPC · JPL
581765	2015 KR_{133}	—	October 8, 2008	Mount Lemmon	Mount Lemmon Survey	EUN	1.3 km	MPC · JPL
581766	2015 KS_{133}	—	February 24, 2014	Haleakala	Pan-STARRS 1	·	2.9 km	MPC · JPL
581767	2015 KN_{135}	—	April 20, 2015	Kitt Peak	Spacewatch	·	1.2 km	MPC · JPL
581768	2015 KN_{136}	—	March 8, 2009	Mount Lemmon	Mount Lemmon Survey	EOS	2.5 km	MPC · JPL
581769	2015 KX_{136}	—	April 18, 2015	Mount Lemmon	Mount Lemmon Survey	·	2.3 km	MPC · JPL
581770	2015 KB_{138}	—	March 17, 2004	Kitt Peak	Spacewatch	·	1.8 km	MPC · JPL
581771	2015 KT_{139}	—	May 24, 2015	Haleakala	Pan-STARRS 1	·	1.8 km	MPC · JPL
581772	2015 KP_{140}	—	September 21, 2003	Palomar	NEAT	·	2.3 km	MPC · JPL
581773	2015 KU_{140}	—	October 11, 2005	Kitt Peak	Spacewatch	·	460 m	MPC · JPL
581774	2015 KY_{140}	—	May 24, 2015	Haleakala	Pan-STARRS 1	·	1.2 km	MPC · JPL
581775	2015 KO_{141}	—	November 17, 2006	Kitt Peak	Spacewatch	·	2.4 km	MPC · JPL
581776	2015 KL_{142}	—	February 25, 2003	Campo Imperatore	CINEOS	THM	2.9 km	MPC · JPL
581777	2015 KZ_{142}	—	February 10, 2014	Mount Lemmon	Mount Lemmon Survey	·	2.4 km	MPC · JPL
581778	2015 KD_{143}	—	May 20, 2015	Haleakala	Pan-STARRS 1	·	1.9 km	MPC · JPL
581779	2015 KU_{143}	—	February 24, 2014	Haleakala	Pan-STARRS 1	·	2.5 km	MPC · JPL
581780	2015 KV_{143}	—	March 2, 2009	Kitt Peak	Spacewatch	·	1.9 km	MPC · JPL
581781	2015 KV_{144}	—	October 15, 2001	Palomar	NEAT	EOS	1.8 km	MPC · JPL
581782	2015 KR_{145}	—	May 18, 2015	Haleakala	Pan-STARRS 2	THM	1.8 km	MPC · JPL
581783	2015 KU_{146}	—	October 20, 2012	Haleakala	Pan-STARRS 1	·	1.2 km	MPC · JPL
581784	2015 KE_{147}	—	April 18, 2015	Haleakala	Pan-STARRS 1	MAR	970 m	MPC · JPL
581785	2015 KR_{148}	—	December 22, 2012	Haleakala	Pan-STARRS 1	·	2.2 km	MPC · JPL
581786	2015 KE_{149}	—	February 11, 2014	Mount Lemmon	Mount Lemmon Survey	·	2.7 km	MPC · JPL
581787	2015 KH_{150}	—	September 4, 2011	Haleakala	Pan-STARRS 1	·	1.4 km	MPC · JPL
581788	2015 KL_{150}	—	March 20, 2001	Kitt Peak	Spacewatch	·	2.1 km	MPC · JPL
581789	2015 KP_{150}	—	March 24, 2009	Mount Lemmon	Mount Lemmon Survey	VER	2.2 km	MPC · JPL
581790	2015 KA_{151}	—	May 11, 2010	Mount Lemmon	Mount Lemmon Survey	·	1.7 km	MPC · JPL
581791	2015 KX_{151}	—	February 24, 2014	Haleakala	Pan-STARRS 1	NAE	2.4 km	MPC · JPL
581792	2015 KE_{153}	—	September 2, 2011	Haleakala	Pan-STARRS 1	·	2.2 km	MPC · JPL
581793	2015 KQ_{153}	—	May 25, 2015	Haleakala	Pan-STARRS 1	·	2.5 km	MPC · JPL
581794	2015 KA_{154}	—	December 16, 2007	Mount Lemmon	Mount Lemmon Survey	·	3.4 km	MPC · JPL
581795	2015 KF_{154}	—	May 25, 2015	Haleakala	Pan-STARRS 2	·	2.1 km	MPC · JPL
581796	2015 KY_{158}	—	January 9, 2014	Haleakala	Pan-STARRS 1	EOS	1.7 km	MPC · JPL
581797	2015 KF_{159}	—	May 26, 2015	Haleakala	Pan-STARRS 1	·	2.1 km	MPC · JPL
581798	2015 KU_{159}	—	April 13, 2004	Kitt Peak	Spacewatch	·	2.5 km	MPC · JPL
581799	2015 KD_{160}	—	March 25, 2006	Kitt Peak	Spacewatch	·	1.5 km	MPC · JPL
581800	2015 KN_{165}	—	March 15, 2004	Kitt Peak	Spacewatch	·	1.3 km	MPC · JPL

== 581801–581900 ==
back to top

Designation			Discovery			Properties		Ref
Permanent	Provisional	Named after	Date	Site	Discoverer(s)	Category	Diam.	Ref
581801	2015 KB_{166}	—	October 3, 2011	Taunus	Karge, S., Zimmer, U.	·	1.4 km	MPC · JPL
581802	2015 KB_{167}	—	March 6, 2014	Kitt Peak	Spacewatch	(43176)	2.5 km	MPC · JPL
581803	2015 KC_{167}	—	May 21, 2015	Haleakala	Pan-STARRS 1	·	2.1 km	MPC · JPL
581804	2015 KN_{167}	—	May 24, 2015	Mauna Kea	OSSOS	twotino	80 km	MPC · JPL
581805	2015 KX_{167}	—	February 10, 2014	Haleakala	Pan-STARRS 1	·	2.0 km	MPC · JPL
581806	2015 KZ_{167}	—	May 18, 2015	Haleakala	Pan-STARRS 2	EOS	1.7 km	MPC · JPL
581807	2015 KD_{168}	—	September 4, 2011	Haleakala	Pan-STARRS 1	·	1.7 km	MPC · JPL
581808	2015 KJ_{168}	—	February 12, 2002	Kitt Peak	Spacewatch	(5)	930 m	MPC · JPL
581809	2015 KL_{168}	—	October 20, 2003	Kitt Peak	Spacewatch	·	1.8 km	MPC · JPL
581810	2015 KK_{169}	—	September 17, 2010	Mount Lemmon	Mount Lemmon Survey	·	1.7 km	MPC · JPL
581811	2015 KU_{169}	—	May 21, 2015	Haleakala	Pan-STARRS 1	·	2.2 km	MPC · JPL
581812	2015 KO_{170}	—	September 4, 2011	Haleakala	Pan-STARRS 1	EOS	1.4 km	MPC · JPL
581813	2015 KT_{170}	—	May 21, 2015	Haleakala	Pan-STARRS 1	BRA	1.3 km	MPC · JPL
581814	2015 KV_{170}	—	November 11, 2012	Nogales	M. Schwartz, P. R. Holvorcem	·	2.2 km	MPC · JPL
581815	2015 KS_{172}	—	September 21, 2011	Kitt Peak	Spacewatch	·	2.0 km	MPC · JPL
581816	2015 KG_{179}	—	August 1, 2016	Haleakala	Pan-STARRS 1	·	1.6 km	MPC · JPL
581817	2015 KE_{180}	—	May 24, 2015	Haleakala	Pan-STARRS 1	EOS	1.2 km	MPC · JPL
581818	2015 KB_{182}	—	July 14, 2016	Haleakala	Pan-STARRS 1	(5)	840 m	MPC · JPL
581819	2015 KH_{188}	—	May 21, 2015	Haleakala	Pan-STARRS 1	·	2.3 km	MPC · JPL
581820	2015 KR_{188}	—	May 25, 2015	Haleakala	Pan-STARRS 1	·	1.1 km	MPC · JPL
581821	2015 KS_{188}	—	May 21, 2015	Haleakala	Pan-STARRS 1	·	1.8 km	MPC · JPL
581822	2015 KM_{189}	—	May 27, 2015	Mount Lemmon	Mount Lemmon Survey	·	1.6 km	MPC · JPL
581823	2015 KV_{189}	—	May 24, 2015	Haleakala	Pan-STARRS 1	·	1.0 km	MPC · JPL
581824	2015 KJ_{190}	—	May 22, 2015	Haleakala	Pan-STARRS 1	·	1.9 km	MPC · JPL
581825	2015 KS_{190}	—	May 25, 2015	Haleakala	Pan-STARRS 1	·	1.2 km	MPC · JPL
581826	2015 KZ_{191}	—	May 21, 2015	Haleakala	Pan-STARRS 1	THM	1.9 km	MPC · JPL
581827	2015 KJ_{195}	—	May 25, 2015	Haleakala	Pan-STARRS 1	·	1.9 km	MPC · JPL
581828	2015 KW_{197}	—	May 26, 2015	Haleakala	Pan-STARRS 1	·	2.5 km	MPC · JPL
581829	2015 KO_{199}	—	May 21, 2015	Haleakala	Pan-STARRS 1	·	2.0 km	MPC · JPL
581830	2015 LN	—	February 1, 2009	Catalina	CSS	·	3.6 km	MPC · JPL
581831	2015 LY	—	March 29, 2015	Haleakala	Pan-STARRS 1	·	920 m	MPC · JPL
581832	2015 LS_{2}	—	January 8, 2010	Mount Lemmon	Mount Lemmon Survey	·	1.2 km	MPC · JPL
581833	2015 LF_{4}	—	December 11, 2013	Haleakala	Pan-STARRS 1	THB	2.5 km	MPC · JPL
581834	2015 LV_{5}	—	January 14, 2002	Palomar	NEAT	·	1.5 km	MPC · JPL
581835	2015 LN_{6}	—	June 9, 2010	Kitt Peak	Spacewatch	·	2.7 km	MPC · JPL
581836	2015 LD_{7}	—	March 28, 2015	Haleakala	Pan-STARRS 1	·	2.0 km	MPC · JPL
581837	2015 LA_{8}	—	September 14, 2007	Mount Lemmon	Mount Lemmon Survey	·	1.4 km	MPC · JPL
581838	2015 LG_{10}	—	November 26, 2012	Mount Lemmon	Mount Lemmon Survey	·	2.4 km	MPC · JPL
581839	2015 LJ_{10}	—	December 8, 2012	Mount Lemmon	Mount Lemmon Survey	·	1.9 km	MPC · JPL
581840	2015 LQ_{11}	—	June 9, 2015	Haleakala	Pan-STARRS 1	·	4.2 km	MPC · JPL
581841	2015 LP_{12}	—	June 13, 2007	Kitt Peak	Spacewatch	·	1.5 km	MPC · JPL
581842	2015 LO_{13}	—	May 14, 2015	Haleakala	Pan-STARRS 1	·	1.3 km	MPC · JPL
581843	2015 LT_{13}	—	June 7, 2015	Haleakala	Pan-STARRS 1	MAR	800 m	MPC · JPL
581844	2015 LL_{14}	—	March 11, 2014	Mount Lemmon	Mount Lemmon Survey	(1298)	2.7 km	MPC · JPL
581845	2015 LZ_{14}	—	December 8, 2012	Mount Lemmon	Mount Lemmon Survey	(116763)	1.6 km	MPC · JPL
581846	2015 LP_{15}	—	September 4, 2011	Haleakala	Pan-STARRS 1	·	2.4 km	MPC · JPL
581847	2015 LU_{15}	—	June 11, 2015	Haleakala	Pan-STARRS 1	·	960 m	MPC · JPL
581848	2015 LD_{16}	—	June 11, 2015	Haleakala	Pan-STARRS 1	·	2.6 km	MPC · JPL
581849	2015 LR_{16}	—	June 11, 2015	Haleakala	Pan-STARRS 1	·	2.4 km	MPC · JPL
581850	2015 LV_{16}	—	June 11, 2015	Haleakala	Pan-STARRS 1	THM	1.9 km	MPC · JPL
581851	2015 LA_{17}	—	May 17, 2009	Mount Lemmon	Mount Lemmon Survey	·	2.5 km	MPC · JPL
581852	2015 LH_{17}	—	February 10, 2014	Mount Lemmon	Mount Lemmon Survey	·	2.1 km	MPC · JPL
581853	2015 LV_{17}	—	June 11, 2015	Haleakala	Pan-STARRS 1	·	3.3 km	MPC · JPL
581854	2015 LD_{19}	—	November 10, 2005	Mount Lemmon	Mount Lemmon Survey	·	1.6 km	MPC · JPL
581855	2015 LY_{19}	—	March 8, 2014	Mount Lemmon	Mount Lemmon Survey	·	2.6 km	MPC · JPL
581856	2015 LG_{20}	—	October 17, 2007	Mount Lemmon	Mount Lemmon Survey	·	1.8 km	MPC · JPL
581857	2015 LY_{21}	—	February 14, 2010	Mount Lemmon	Mount Lemmon Survey	·	1.2 km	MPC · JPL
581858	2015 LO_{22}	—	October 26, 2008	Mount Lemmon	Mount Lemmon Survey	·	1.6 km	MPC · JPL
581859	2015 LS_{22}	—	May 21, 2015	Haleakala	Pan-STARRS 1	·	1.7 km	MPC · JPL
581860	2015 LX_{22}	—	May 21, 2015	Haleakala	Pan-STARRS 1	·	1.2 km	MPC · JPL
581861	2015 LC_{24}	—	April 27, 2009	Mount Lemmon	Mount Lemmon Survey	·	2.7 km	MPC · JPL
581862	2015 LZ_{24}	—	June 13, 2015	Haleakala	Pan-STARRS 1	·	990 m	MPC · JPL
581863	2015 LY_{25}	—	January 28, 2014	Mount Lemmon	Mount Lemmon Survey	·	1.3 km	MPC · JPL
581864	2015 LA_{26}	—	December 5, 2005	Kitt Peak	Spacewatch	·	910 m	MPC · JPL
581865	2015 LS_{26}	—	August 30, 2005	Kitt Peak	Spacewatch	·	2.0 km	MPC · JPL
581866	2015 LB_{27}	—	December 27, 2013	Mount Lemmon	Mount Lemmon Survey	·	1.2 km	MPC · JPL
581867	2015 LE_{27}	—	June 13, 2015	Haleakala	Pan-STARRS 1	·	2.4 km	MPC · JPL
581868	2015 LU_{27}	—	December 3, 2007	Kitt Peak	Spacewatch	EOS	2.0 km	MPC · JPL
581869	2015 LL_{28}	—	January 31, 2006	Mount Lemmon	Mount Lemmon Survey	·	1.1 km	MPC · JPL
581870	2015 LE_{30}	—	June 13, 2015	Haleakala	Pan-STARRS 1	·	2.7 km	MPC · JPL
581871	2015 LB_{32}	—	October 23, 2011	Haleakala	Pan-STARRS 1	·	2.9 km	MPC · JPL
581872	2015 LG_{32}	—	June 13, 2015	Haleakala	Pan-STARRS 1	·	1.4 km	MPC · JPL
581873	2015 LH_{35}	—	December 29, 2013	Haleakala	Pan-STARRS 1	·	1.0 km	MPC · JPL
581874	2015 LW_{35}	—	June 14, 2015	Mount Lemmon	Mount Lemmon Survey	·	1.0 km	MPC · JPL
581875	2015 LO_{37}	—	August 26, 2011	Piszkés-tető	K. Sárneczky, S. Kürti	EOS	2.0 km	MPC · JPL
581876	2015 LT_{37}	—	October 31, 2006	Mount Lemmon	Mount Lemmon Survey	·	2.3 km	MPC · JPL
581877	2015 LU_{37}	—	April 23, 2015	Haleakala	Pan-STARRS 1	·	1.3 km	MPC · JPL
581878	2015 LD_{40}	—	April 1, 2003	Apache Point	SDSS Collaboration	EOS	2.5 km	MPC · JPL
581879	2015 LS_{43}	—	June 7, 2015	Haleakala	Pan-STARRS 1	·	2.6 km	MPC · JPL
581880	2015 LA_{44}	—	June 10, 2015	Haleakala	Pan-STARRS 1	URS	2.7 km	MPC · JPL
581881	2015 LS_{44}	—	April 30, 2009	Kitt Peak	Spacewatch	·	2.2 km	MPC · JPL
581882	2015 LP_{45}	—	September 29, 2011	Mount Lemmon	Mount Lemmon Survey	·	1.6 km	MPC · JPL
581883	2015 LQ_{45}	—	June 15, 2015	Mount Lemmon	Mount Lemmon Survey	EUN	960 m	MPC · JPL
581884	2015 LU_{45}	—	February 13, 2002	Apache Point	SDSS Collaboration	·	3.8 km	MPC · JPL
581885	2015 LZ_{45}	—	March 24, 2014	Haleakala	Pan-STARRS 1	·	2.1 km	MPC · JPL
581886	2015 LA_{46}	—	February 6, 2013	Nogales	M. Schwartz, P. R. Holvorcem	·	3.4 km	MPC · JPL
581887	2015 LL_{46}	—	June 15, 2015	Haleakala	Pan-STARRS 1	·	2.6 km	MPC · JPL
581888	2015 LO_{46}	—	December 16, 2007	Mount Lemmon	Mount Lemmon Survey	·	2.1 km	MPC · JPL
581889	2015 LU_{46}	—	June 12, 2015	Mount Lemmon	Mount Lemmon Survey	EUN	810 m	MPC · JPL
581890	2015 LZ_{46}	—	June 12, 2015	Haleakala	Pan-STARRS 1	·	2.4 km	MPC · JPL
581891	2015 LW_{50}	—	June 7, 2015	Mount Lemmon	Mount Lemmon Survey	·	2.0 km	MPC · JPL
581892	2015 LY_{50}	—	April 4, 2014	Kitt Peak	Spacewatch	·	1.6 km	MPC · JPL
581893	2015 LB_{51}	—	June 7, 2015	Haleakala	Pan-STARRS 1	EOS	1.4 km	MPC · JPL
581894	2015 LF_{51}	—	June 10, 2015	Haleakala	Pan-STARRS 1	·	2.2 km	MPC · JPL
581895	2015 LK_{51}	—	June 14, 2015	Mount Lemmon	Mount Lemmon Survey	EOS	1.7 km	MPC · JPL
581896	2015 LF_{52}	—	June 15, 2015	Haleakala	Pan-STARRS 1	·	2.1 km	MPC · JPL
581897	2015 LZ_{52}	—	June 7, 2015	Mount Lemmon	Mount Lemmon Survey	EOS	1.5 km	MPC · JPL
581898	2015 ME_{2}	—	March 25, 2015	Mount Lemmon	Mount Lemmon Survey	JUN	720 m	MPC · JPL
581899	2015 MN_{2}	—	October 1, 2005	Mount Lemmon	Mount Lemmon Survey	·	2.8 km	MPC · JPL
581900	2015 MQ_{5}	—	January 12, 2013	Bergisch Gladbach	W. Bickel	·	2.9 km	MPC · JPL

== 581901–582000 ==
back to top

Designation			Discovery			Properties		Ref
Permanent	Provisional	Named after	Date	Site	Discoverer(s)	Category	Diam.	Ref
581901	2015 MD_{6}	—	August 5, 2011	Piszkés-tető	K. Sárneczky, A. Pál	·	1.9 km	MPC · JPL
581902	2015 MP_{7}	—	June 16, 2015	Haleakala	Pan-STARRS 1	·	2.8 km	MPC · JPL
581903	2015 MD_{8}	—	August 30, 2005	Palomar	NEAT	·	1.9 km	MPC · JPL
581904	2015 MS_{8}	—	December 16, 2012	ESA OGS	ESA OGS	·	2.1 km	MPC · JPL
581905	2015 ML_{9}	—	August 8, 2004	Palomar	NEAT	THB	2.8 km	MPC · JPL
581906	2015 MQ_{11}	—	March 21, 2015	Haleakala	Pan-STARRS 1	·	960 m	MPC · JPL
581907	2015 MD_{12}	—	October 27, 2011	Mount Lemmon	Mount Lemmon Survey	VER	2.8 km	MPC · JPL
581908	2015 MW_{14}	—	September 18, 2010	Mount Lemmon	Mount Lemmon Survey	·	2.7 km	MPC · JPL
581909	2015 MD_{15}	—	February 20, 2014	Mount Lemmon	Mount Lemmon Survey	·	1.3 km	MPC · JPL
581910	2015 MU_{16}	—	August 21, 2006	Kitt Peak	Spacewatch	·	1.6 km	MPC · JPL
581911	2015 MY_{16}	—	February 15, 2010	Kitt Peak	Spacewatch	·	2.0 km	MPC · JPL
581912	2015 MO_{17}	—	October 27, 2012	Mount Lemmon	Mount Lemmon Survey	·	3.9 km	MPC · JPL
581913	2015 MQ_{18}	—	May 15, 2015	Haleakala	Pan-STARRS 1	·	1.7 km	MPC · JPL
581914	2015 MF_{20}	—	October 2, 2006	Mount Lemmon	Mount Lemmon Survey	·	3.7 km	MPC · JPL
581915	2015 MC_{22}	—	October 2, 2006	Mount Lemmon	Mount Lemmon Survey	·	2.5 km	MPC · JPL
581916	2015 MF_{28}	—	October 3, 2011	Mount Lemmon	Mount Lemmon Survey	VER	2.1 km	MPC · JPL
581917	2015 MJ_{29}	—	September 11, 2007	Kitt Peak	Spacewatch	·	1.6 km	MPC · JPL
581918	2015 MA_{30}	—	May 26, 2015	Haleakala	Pan-STARRS 1	·	3.0 km	MPC · JPL
581919	2015 MB_{31}	—	May 21, 2015	Haleakala	Pan-STARRS 1	EOS	1.4 km	MPC · JPL
581920	2015 MV_{31}	—	May 22, 2015	Haleakala	Pan-STARRS 1	NAE	1.9 km	MPC · JPL
581921	2015 MA_{33}	—	September 25, 2011	Haleakala	Pan-STARRS 1	·	2.2 km	MPC · JPL
581922	2015 ME_{34}	—	March 3, 2009	Kitt Peak	Spacewatch	·	1.5 km	MPC · JPL
581923	2015 MZ_{35}	—	September 20, 2011	Kitt Peak	Spacewatch	·	2.4 km	MPC · JPL
581924	2015 MY_{36}	—	June 18, 2015	Haleakala	Pan-STARRS 1	EOS	1.5 km	MPC · JPL
581925	2015 ME_{37}	—	May 29, 2011	Kitt Peak	Spacewatch	·	950 m	MPC · JPL
581926	2015 MT_{37}	—	December 11, 2012	Mount Lemmon	Mount Lemmon Survey	·	1.6 km	MPC · JPL
581927	2015 MR_{38}	—	May 18, 2015	Haleakala	Pan-STARRS 1	·	1.4 km	MPC · JPL
581928	2015 MD_{39}	—	February 24, 2014	Haleakala	Pan-STARRS 1	·	1.8 km	MPC · JPL
581929	2015 MP_{39}	—	June 18, 2015	Haleakala	Pan-STARRS 1	EUN	820 m	MPC · JPL
581930	2015 MQ_{39}	—	May 26, 2015	Mount Lemmon	Mount Lemmon Survey	·	1.9 km	MPC · JPL
581931	2015 MW_{39}	—	March 28, 2015	Haleakala	Pan-STARRS 1	·	960 m	MPC · JPL
581932	2015 MD_{40}	—	January 11, 2008	Kitt Peak	Spacewatch	·	2.9 km	MPC · JPL
581933	2015 MA_{41}	—	September 24, 2011	Haleakala	Pan-STARRS 1	·	1.8 km	MPC · JPL
581934	2015 MK_{42}	—	February 3, 2009	Kitt Peak	Spacewatch	EOS	1.3 km	MPC · JPL
581935	2015 MJ_{43}	—	June 18, 2015	Haleakala	Pan-STARRS 1	·	1.9 km	MPC · JPL
581936	2015 MK_{43}	—	January 20, 2009	Kitt Peak	Spacewatch	·	1.5 km	MPC · JPL
581937	2015 MG_{47}	—	June 17, 2015	Haleakala	Pan-STARRS 1	·	1.3 km	MPC · JPL
581938	2015 MQ_{48}	—	June 17, 2015	Haleakala	Pan-STARRS 1	·	1.7 km	MPC · JPL
581939	2015 MD_{49}	—	October 26, 2011	Haleakala	Pan-STARRS 1	GEF	950 m	MPC · JPL
581940	2015 MX_{51}	—	June 7, 2015	Mount Lemmon	Mount Lemmon Survey	TIR	1.9 km	MPC · JPL
581941	2015 MH_{53}	—	June 19, 2015	Haleakala	Pan-STARRS 1	·	2.7 km	MPC · JPL
581942	2015 MT_{57}	—	June 12, 2015	Mount Lemmon	Mount Lemmon Survey	·	1.2 km	MPC · JPL
581943	2015 MQ_{59}	—	October 26, 2011	Haleakala	Pan-STARRS 1	·	3.3 km	MPC · JPL
581944	2015 MR_{60}	—	December 29, 2008	Kitt Peak	Spacewatch	·	1.5 km	MPC · JPL
581945	2015 MY_{60}	—	October 1, 2010	Kitt Peak	Spacewatch	THM	1.6 km	MPC · JPL
581946	2015 MJ_{63}	—	April 29, 2009	Kitt Peak	Spacewatch	EOS	2.0 km	MPC · JPL
581947	2015 MN_{63}	—	February 8, 2008	Kitt Peak	Spacewatch	·	2.0 km	MPC · JPL
581948	2015 MS_{63}	—	November 17, 2006	Mount Lemmon	Mount Lemmon Survey	·	2.0 km	MPC · JPL
581949	2015 MX_{63}	—	September 12, 2005	Goodricke-Pigott	R. A. Tucker	·	2.7 km	MPC · JPL
581950	2015 MV_{66}	—	March 9, 2004	Palomar	NEAT	·	3.0 km	MPC · JPL
581951	2015 MW_{66}	—	November 2, 2007	Kitt Peak	Spacewatch	BRA	1.8 km	MPC · JPL
581952	2015 MB_{67}	—	May 21, 2015	Haleakala	Pan-STARRS 2	·	1.0 km	MPC · JPL
581953	2015 MD_{67}	—	March 21, 2015	Haleakala	Pan-STARRS 1	·	2.1 km	MPC · JPL
581954	2015 MB_{69}	—	June 15, 2015	Haleakala	Pan-STARRS 1	·	3.9 km	MPC · JPL
581955	2015 ME_{71}	—	June 21, 1998	Kitt Peak	Spacewatch	·	2.1 km	MPC · JPL
581956	2015 MU_{72}	—	March 5, 2008	Mount Lemmon	Mount Lemmon Survey	·	2.2 km	MPC · JPL
581957	2015 ME_{73}	—	October 24, 2011	Haleakala	Pan-STARRS 1	EOS	1.5 km	MPC · JPL
581958	2015 MX_{74}	—	June 18, 2015	Haleakala	Pan-STARRS 1	·	2.2 km	MPC · JPL
581959	2015 MB_{75}	—	February 21, 2014	Kitt Peak	Spacewatch	·	1.9 km	MPC · JPL
581960	2015 MB_{77}	—	June 18, 2015	Haleakala	Pan-STARRS 1	·	2.2 km	MPC · JPL
581961	2015 MQ_{80}	—	April 6, 2010	Kitt Peak	Spacewatch	MRX	770 m	MPC · JPL
581962	2015 MK_{81}	—	December 27, 2006	Mount Lemmon	Mount Lemmon Survey	·	3.4 km	MPC · JPL
581963	2015 MC_{82}	—	December 25, 2011	Kitt Peak	Spacewatch	·	2.4 km	MPC · JPL
581964	2015 MY_{82}	—	September 26, 2011	Mount Lemmon	Mount Lemmon Survey	·	1.3 km	MPC · JPL
581965	2015 MZ_{84}	—	June 18, 2015	Haleakala	Pan-STARRS 1	·	2.3 km	MPC · JPL
581966	2015 ME_{86}	—	February 15, 2013	Haleakala	Pan-STARRS 1	·	2.7 km	MPC · JPL
581967	2015 MF_{87}	—	April 5, 2014	Haleakala	Pan-STARRS 1	·	2.2 km	MPC · JPL
581968	2015 MJ_{89}	—	June 22, 2015	Haleakala	Pan-STARRS 1	·	1.6 km	MPC · JPL
581969	2015 MP_{89}	—	May 21, 2015	Haleakala	Pan-STARRS 1	·	2.0 km	MPC · JPL
581970	2015 MQ_{89}	—	January 25, 2009	Kitt Peak	Spacewatch	·	1.5 km	MPC · JPL
581971	2015 MT_{89}	—	January 4, 2013	Cerro Tololo-DECam	DECam	·	2.9 km	MPC · JPL
581972	2015 MA_{91}	—	December 1, 2005	Mount Lemmon	Mount Lemmon Survey	·	4.1 km	MPC · JPL
581973	2015 MZ_{91}	—	September 21, 2003	Kitt Peak	Spacewatch	MAR	940 m	MPC · JPL
581974	2015 MU_{92}	—	April 24, 2015	Kitt Peak	Spacewatch	·	1.0 km	MPC · JPL
581975	2015 MD_{93}	—	May 14, 2015	Haleakala	Pan-STARRS 1	·	2.5 km	MPC · JPL
581976	2015 MQ_{93}	—	December 18, 2007	Mount Lemmon	Mount Lemmon Survey	·	2.9 km	MPC · JPL
581977	2015 MG_{96}	—	January 5, 2013	Kitt Peak	Spacewatch	·	3.0 km	MPC · JPL
581978	2015 MV_{96}	—	December 23, 2012	Haleakala	Pan-STARRS 1	·	2.1 km	MPC · JPL
581979	2015 MA_{97}	—	June 13, 2015	Mount Lemmon	Mount Lemmon Survey	ADE	1.4 km	MPC · JPL
581980	2015 ML_{97}	—	January 27, 2007	Kitt Peak	Spacewatch	·	2.3 km	MPC · JPL
581981	2015 MV_{99}	—	June 18, 2015	Haleakala	Pan-STARRS 1	·	2.2 km	MPC · JPL
581982	2015 MZ_{99}	—	June 10, 2005	Kitt Peak	Spacewatch	·	2.0 km	MPC · JPL
581983	2015 MY_{101}	—	May 5, 2006	Kitt Peak	Spacewatch	·	1.5 km	MPC · JPL
581984	2015 MO_{104}	—	June 20, 2015	Haleakala	Pan-STARRS 1	EUN	930 m	MPC · JPL
581985	2015 MT_{104}	—	June 13, 2015	Haleakala	Pan-STARRS 1	THM	2.3 km	MPC · JPL
581986	2015 MA_{105}	—	February 2, 2008	Catalina	CSS	·	2.8 km	MPC · JPL
581987	2015 MN_{107}	—	May 4, 2014	Haleakala	Pan-STARRS 1	·	2.7 km	MPC · JPL
581988	2015 MU_{108}	—	June 20, 2015	Haleakala	Pan-STARRS 1	·	2.4 km	MPC · JPL
581989	2015 MN_{109}	—	February 13, 2013	Haleakala	Pan-STARRS 1	·	3.4 km	MPC · JPL
581990	2015 MC_{110}	—	January 13, 2013	ESA OGS	ESA OGS	·	3.2 km	MPC · JPL
581991	2015 MG_{111}	—	April 30, 2014	Haleakala	Pan-STARRS 1	EOS	2.0 km	MPC · JPL
581992	2015 MD_{112}	—	June 15, 2015	Haleakala	Pan-STARRS 1	·	1.1 km	MPC · JPL
581993	2015 MS_{113}	—	February 14, 2013	Haleakala	Pan-STARRS 1	·	2.6 km	MPC · JPL
581994	2015 MK_{115}	—	February 28, 2008	Mount Lemmon	Mount Lemmon Survey	·	2.7 km	MPC · JPL
581995	2015 MF_{116}	—	October 7, 2007	Mount Lemmon	Mount Lemmon Survey	·	760 m	MPC · JPL
581996	2015 MU_{117}	—	July 21, 2011	Haleakala	Pan-STARRS 1	·	1.6 km	MPC · JPL
581997	2015 MY_{123}	—	June 28, 2015	Haleakala	Pan-STARRS 1	·	2.3 km	MPC · JPL
581998	2015 MD_{124}	—	November 10, 2005	Kitt Peak	Spacewatch	·	3.0 km	MPC · JPL
581999	2015 MK_{124}	—	October 30, 2005	Mount Lemmon	Mount Lemmon Survey	·	2.8 km	MPC · JPL
582000	2015 MB_{127}	—	October 19, 2011	Mount Lemmon	Mount Lemmon Survey	·	1.2 km	MPC · JPL

back to top

== Meaning of names ==
As minor planet discoveries are confirmed, they are given a permanent number by the IAU's Minor Planet Center (MPC), and the discoverers can then submit names for them, following the IAU's naming conventions. The list below concerns those minor planets in the specified number-range that have received names, and explains the meanings of those names.

Official naming citations of newly named small Solar System bodies are approved and published in a bulletin by IAU's Working Group for Small Bodies Nomenclature (WGSBN). Before May 2021, citations were published in MPC's Minor Planet Circulars for many decades. Recent citations can also be found on the JPL Small-Body Database (SBDB). Until his death in 2016, German astronomer Lutz D. Schmadel compiled these citations into the Dictionary of Minor Planet Names (DMP) and regularly updated the collection.

Based on Paul Herget's The Names of the Minor Planets, Schmadel also researched the unclear origin of numerous asteroids, most of which had been named prior to World War II. This article incorporates text from this source, which is in the public domain: SBDB New namings may only be added to this list below after official publication as the preannouncement of names is condemned. The WGSBN publishes a comprehensive guideline for the naming rules of non-cometary small Solar System bodies.

Named minor planet	Provisional	This minor planet was named for...	Ref · Catalog
581587 Pazmany	2015 HX_{210}	Nicoleta Pazmany, retired Romanian teacher of physics who founded and leads the Meridian 0 Astroclub. (SBDB).	IAU · 581587
