= List of minor planets: 505001–506000 =

The following is a partial list of minor planets, running from minor-planet number 505001 through 506000, inclusive. The primary data for this and other partial lists is based on JPL's "Small-Body Orbital Elements" and data available from the Minor Planet Center. Critical list information is also provided by the MPC, unless otherwise specified from Lowell Observatory. A detailed description of the table's columns and additional sources are given on the main page including a complete list of every page in this series, and a statistical break-up on the dynamical classification of minor planets.

Also see the summary list of all named bodies in numerical and alphabetical order, and the corresponding naming citations for the number range of this particular list. New namings may only be added to this list after official publication, as the preannouncement of names is condemned by the Working Group for Small Bodies Nomenclature of the International Astronomical Union.

Near-Earth obj.	MBA (inner)	MBA (outer)	Centaur
Mars-crosser	MBA (middle)	Jupiter trojan	Trans-Neptunian obj.
Unclassified

== 505001–505100 ==
Designation			Discovery			Properties		Ref
Permanent	Provisional	Named after	Date	Site	Discoverer(s)	Category	Diam.	Ref
505001	2011 KO_{15}	—	May 26, 2011	Siding Spring	SSS	T_{j} (2.91)	2.2 km	MPC · JPL
505002	2011 KR_{37}	—	May 22, 2011	Kitt Peak	Spacewatch	HOF	2.3 km	MPC · JPL
505003	2011 LP_{24}	—	January 30, 2011	Haleakala	Pan-STARRS 1	·	2.0 km	MPC · JPL
505004	2011 LF_{28}	—	May 23, 2011	Mount Lemmon	Mount Lemmon Survey	·	1.9 km	MPC · JPL
505005	2011 MA_{9}	—	June 3, 2011	Mount Lemmon	Mount Lemmon Survey	·	2.9 km	MPC · JPL
505006	2011 MH_{9}	—	June 3, 2011	Mount Lemmon	Mount Lemmon Survey	·	2.5 km	MPC · JPL
505007	2011 NK_{3}	—	July 5, 2011	Haleakala	Pan-STARRS 1	·	3.5 km	MPC · JPL
505008	2011 OY_{12}	—	June 24, 2011	Kitt Peak	Spacewatch	·	2.1 km	MPC · JPL
505009	2011 OD_{13}	—	September 17, 2006	Catalina	CSS	·	2.8 km	MPC · JPL
505010	2011 OH_{15}	—	July 26, 2011	Haleakala	Pan-STARRS 1	H	450 m	MPC · JPL
505011	2011 OW_{39}	—	February 11, 2010	WISE	WISE	T_{j} (2.97)	3.1 km	MPC · JPL
505012	2011 PR_{3}	—	August 1, 2011	Haleakala	Pan-STARRS 1	·	1.7 km	MPC · JPL
505013	2011 PU_{5}	—	July 11, 2010	WISE	WISE	EMA	2.9 km	MPC · JPL
505014	2011 PP_{12}	—	July 28, 2011	Siding Spring	SSS	·	2.9 km	MPC · JPL
505015	2011 QF_{1}	—	June 11, 2010	WISE	WISE	T_{j} (2.94)	2.7 km	MPC · JPL
505016	2011 QJ_{2}	—	August 10, 2011	Haleakala	Pan-STARRS 1	ARM	3.2 km	MPC · JPL
505017	2011 QU_{2}	—	May 16, 2010	WISE	WISE	·	3.6 km	MPC · JPL
505018	2011 QR_{16}	—	July 7, 2010	WISE	WISE	·	3.2 km	MPC · JPL
505019	2011 QH_{21}	—	August 23, 2011	Haleakala	Pan-STARRS 1	AMO · APO	550 m	MPC · JPL
505020	2011 QR_{22}	—	August 24, 2011	Haleakala	Pan-STARRS 1	EOS	2.3 km	MPC · JPL
505021	2011 QW_{24}	—	February 14, 2010	WISE	WISE	·	4.0 km	MPC · JPL
505022	2011 QQ_{32}	—	June 8, 2011	Haleakala	Pan-STARRS 1	·	2.9 km	MPC · JPL
505023	2011 QP_{34}	—	August 24, 2011	La Sagra	OAM	·	2.9 km	MPC · JPL
505024	2011 QY_{40}	—	September 27, 2000	Socorro	LINEAR	·	3.0 km	MPC · JPL
505025	2011 QN_{60}	—	August 30, 2011	Haleakala	Pan-STARRS 1	EOS	2.4 km	MPC · JPL
505026	2011 QJ_{61}	—	August 31, 2011	Haleakala	Pan-STARRS 1	EOS	1.8 km	MPC · JPL
505027	2011 QR_{61}	—	August 31, 2011	Haleakala	Pan-STARRS 1	·	2.8 km	MPC · JPL
505028	2011 QE_{63}	—	August 30, 2011	Haleakala	Pan-STARRS 1	EOS	2.1 km	MPC · JPL
505029	2011 QK_{63}	—	August 23, 2011	Haleakala	Pan-STARRS 1	·	3.4 km	MPC · JPL
505030	2011 QP_{64}	—	February 9, 2008	Kitt Peak	Spacewatch	·	2.6 km	MPC · JPL
505031	2011 QE_{69}	—	August 31, 2000	Kitt Peak	Spacewatch	THM	2.1 km	MPC · JPL
505032	2011 QH_{76}	—	July 5, 2005	Mount Lemmon	Mount Lemmon Survey	·	2.4 km	MPC · JPL
505033	2011 QA_{77}	—	November 14, 2006	Kitt Peak	Spacewatch	·	2.3 km	MPC · JPL
505034	2011 QJ_{77}	—	November 12, 2006	Mount Lemmon	Mount Lemmon Survey	·	2.2 km	MPC · JPL
505035	2011 QV_{78}	—	February 6, 2008	Kitt Peak	Spacewatch	HYG	3.0 km	MPC · JPL
505036	2011 QE_{92}	—	February 13, 2010	WISE	WISE	·	3.1 km	MPC · JPL
505037	2011 RG	—	August 24, 2011	Haleakala	Pan-STARRS 1	·	3.0 km	MPC · JPL
505038	2011 RO_{2}	—	June 9, 2011	Haleakala	Pan-STARRS 1	·	3.1 km	MPC · JPL
505039	2011 RP_{3}	—	September 5, 2011	Haleakala	Pan-STARRS 1	·	2.3 km	MPC · JPL
505040	2011 RE_{5}	—	December 31, 2007	Catalina	CSS	·	3.0 km	MPC · JPL
505041	2011 RN_{5}	—	September 26, 2006	Mount Lemmon	Mount Lemmon Survey	VER	2.0 km	MPC · JPL
505042	2011 RJ_{7}	—	September 5, 2011	Haleakala	Pan-STARRS 1	·	2.5 km	MPC · JPL
505043	2011 RE_{11}	—	September 4, 2011	Haleakala	Pan-STARRS 1	·	2.6 km	MPC · JPL
505044	2011 RU_{11}	—	July 31, 2010	WISE	WISE	T_{j} (2.98)	2.2 km	MPC · JPL
505045	2011 RY_{15}	—	August 24, 2011	Haleakala	Pan-STARRS 1	·	2.6 km	MPC · JPL
505046	2011 RD_{16}	—	August 30, 2011	Haleakala	Pan-STARRS 1	·	1.9 km	MPC · JPL
505047	2011 SG_{1}	—	September 17, 2011	Haleakala	Pan-STARRS 1	·	2.6 km	MPC · JPL
505048	2011 SU_{6}	—	February 2, 2008	Kitt Peak	Spacewatch	VER	2.2 km	MPC · JPL
505049	2011 SV_{7}	—	September 2, 2011	Haleakala	Pan-STARRS 1	·	2.8 km	MPC · JPL
505050	2011 SO_{34}	—	September 23, 2005	Kitt Peak	Spacewatch	HYG	2.3 km	MPC · JPL
505051	2011 SV_{34}	—	April 15, 2010	WISE	WISE	·	4.1 km	MPC · JPL
505052	2011 SN_{38}	—	November 23, 2006	Mount Lemmon	Mount Lemmon Survey	·	3.2 km	MPC · JPL
505053	2011 SO_{41}	—	January 11, 2008	Kitt Peak	Spacewatch	·	2.3 km	MPC · JPL
505054	2011 SW_{44}	—	August 31, 2011	Haleakala	Pan-STARRS 1	TEL	1.7 km	MPC · JPL
505055	2011 SX_{45}	—	August 30, 2011	Haleakala	Pan-STARRS 1	·	960 m	MPC · JPL
505056	2011 SS_{60}	—	May 19, 2010	Mount Lemmon	Mount Lemmon Survey	·	2.3 km	MPC · JPL
505057	2011 SC_{83}	—	September 26, 2006	Kitt Peak	Spacewatch	·	2.4 km	MPC · JPL
505058	2011 SD_{95}	—	September 24, 2011	Mount Lemmon	Mount Lemmon Survey	·	2.5 km	MPC · JPL
505059	2011 SN_{98}	—	February 10, 2008	Kitt Peak	Spacewatch	·	2.6 km	MPC · JPL
505060	2011 SN_{107}	—	September 2, 2011	Haleakala	Pan-STARRS 1	TIR	2.5 km	MPC · JPL
505061	2011 SG_{121}	—	September 18, 2011	Mount Lemmon	Mount Lemmon Survey	·	3.1 km	MPC · JPL
505062	2011 SS_{133}	—	October 7, 2005	Catalina	CSS	·	2.8 km	MPC · JPL
505063	2011 SQ_{157}	—	September 26, 2011	Haleakala	Pan-STARRS 1	·	2.5 km	MPC · JPL
505064	2011 SQ_{163}	—	September 23, 2011	Kitt Peak	Spacewatch	·	2.9 km	MPC · JPL
505065	2011 SS_{163}	—	September 23, 2011	Kitt Peak	Spacewatch	·	2.5 km	MPC · JPL
505066	2011 SS_{173}	—	March 26, 2010	WISE	WISE	T_{j} (2.99) · EUP	6.2 km	MPC · JPL
505067	2011 SM_{175}	—	April 18, 2009	Kitt Peak	Spacewatch	·	2.4 km	MPC · JPL
505068	2011 SQ_{176}	—	June 11, 2011	Haleakala	Pan-STARRS 1	·	3.6 km	MPC · JPL
505069	2011 SE_{185}	—	April 7, 2008	Mount Lemmon	Mount Lemmon Survey	·	2.5 km	MPC · JPL
505070	2011 SA_{198}	—	August 23, 2011	Haleakala	Pan-STARRS 1	EOS	1.9 km	MPC · JPL
505071	2011 SO_{210}	—	August 24, 2011	Haleakala	Pan-STARRS 1	·	3.5 km	MPC · JPL
505072	2011 SV_{225}	—	September 29, 2011	Mount Lemmon	Mount Lemmon Survey	·	2.7 km	MPC · JPL
505073	2011 SV_{234}	—	September 26, 2011	Haleakala	Pan-STARRS 1	VER	2.8 km	MPC · JPL
505074	2011 SS_{254}	—	February 4, 2009	Kitt Peak	Spacewatch	·	2.9 km	MPC · JPL
505075	2011 SW_{271}	—	October 16, 2006	Kitt Peak	Spacewatch	·	2.8 km	MPC · JPL
505076	2011 TX_{2}	—	August 28, 2005	Siding Spring	SSS	·	3.1 km	MPC · JPL
505077	2011 TJ_{15}	—	April 5, 2003	Kitt Peak	Spacewatch	·	2.8 km	MPC · JPL
505078	2011 UJ_{39}	—	September 24, 2011	Haleakala	Pan-STARRS 1	·	3.3 km	MPC · JPL
505079	2011 UY_{45}	—	September 24, 2011	Haleakala	Pan-STARRS 1	·	3.7 km	MPC · JPL
505080	2011 UY_{90}	—	September 2, 2011	Haleakala	Pan-STARRS 1	·	2.4 km	MPC · JPL
505081	2011 UO_{130}	—	October 2, 2011	La Sagra	OAM	H	660 m	MPC · JPL
505082	2011 UD_{158}	—	September 25, 2005	Catalina	CSS	·	2.6 km	MPC · JPL
505083	2011 UF_{167}	—	September 19, 2011	Haleakala	Pan-STARRS 1	VER	2.5 km	MPC · JPL
505084	2011 UO_{168}	—	September 19, 2011	Mount Lemmon	Mount Lemmon Survey	·	2.1 km	MPC · JPL
505085	2011 UK_{169}	—	March 21, 2010	Mount Lemmon	Mount Lemmon Survey	H	700 m	MPC · JPL
505086	2011 UM_{248}	—	December 27, 2005	Kitt Peak	Spacewatch	·	820 m	MPC · JPL
505087	2011 UA_{323}	—	September 24, 2011	Catalina	CSS	·	3.3 km	MPC · JPL
505088	2011 UK_{326}	—	September 25, 2011	Haleakala	Pan-STARRS 1	LUT	4.6 km	MPC · JPL
505089	2011 UH_{341}	—	December 2, 2005	Kitt Peak	Spacewatch	CYB	3.0 km	MPC · JPL
505090	2011 UC_{397}	—	September 25, 2011	Haleakala	Pan-STARRS 1	·	3.7 km	MPC · JPL
505091	2011 UT_{397}	—	September 25, 2011	Haleakala	Pan-STARRS 1	·	2.9 km	MPC · JPL
505092	2011 UO_{407}	—	February 24, 2010	WISE	WISE	·	4.6 km	MPC · JPL
505093	2011 VQ_{5}	—	November 3, 2011	Mount Lemmon	Mount Lemmon Survey	AMO	560 m	MPC · JPL
505094	2011 WB_{15}	—	April 4, 2008	Mount Lemmon	Mount Lemmon Survey	TIR	2.8 km	MPC · JPL
505095	2011 WH_{33}	—	December 9, 2006	Kitt Peak	Spacewatch	EOS	2.3 km	MPC · JPL
505096	2011 WV_{39}	—	April 8, 2010	WISE	WISE	(895)	4.1 km	MPC · JPL
505097	2011 WU_{48}	—	April 27, 2008	Kitt Peak	Spacewatch	TIR	2.9 km	MPC · JPL
505098	2011 YB_{77}	—	October 9, 2004	Kitt Peak	Spacewatch	·	620 m	MPC · JPL
505099	2012 BN_{10}	—	February 12, 2004	Kitt Peak	Spacewatch	3:2	4.3 km	MPC · JPL
505100	2012 BY_{63}	—	December 27, 2011	Mount Lemmon	Mount Lemmon Survey	3:2	4.2 km	MPC · JPL

== 505101–505200 ==
back to top

Designation			Discovery			Properties		Ref
Permanent	Provisional	Named after	Date	Site	Discoverer(s)	Category	Diam.	Ref
505101	2012 BJ_{105}	—	January 27, 2012	Kitt Peak	Spacewatch	·	4.4 km	MPC · JPL
505102	2012 BY_{138}	—	January 13, 2002	Socorro	LINEAR	·	610 m	MPC · JPL
505103	2012 CD_{12}	—	September 9, 2007	Kitt Peak	Spacewatch	·	580 m	MPC · JPL
505104	2012 CP_{12}	—	January 29, 2012	Kitt Peak	Spacewatch	·	540 m	MPC · JPL
505105	2012 CW_{15}	—	January 26, 2012	Mount Lemmon	Mount Lemmon Survey	·	530 m	MPC · JPL
505106	2012 CE_{44}	—	January 13, 2005	Kitt Peak	Spacewatch	·	620 m	MPC · JPL
505107	2012 CR_{50}	—	January 19, 2012	Haleakala	Pan-STARRS 1	·	740 m	MPC · JPL
505108	2012 DV_{10}	—	February 16, 2012	Haleakala	Pan-STARRS 1	·	760 m	MPC · JPL
505109	2012 DV_{12}	—	March 13, 2005	Kitt Peak	Spacewatch	·	860 m	MPC · JPL
505110	2012 DU_{33}	—	April 4, 2005	Catalina	CSS	·	760 m	MPC · JPL
505111	2012 DR_{38}	—	January 18, 2012	Mount Lemmon	Mount Lemmon Survey	·	880 m	MPC · JPL
505112	2012 DX_{44}	—	October 21, 2007	Kitt Peak	Spacewatch	·	540 m	MPC · JPL
505113	2012 DA_{46}	—	February 27, 2012	Catalina	CSS	PHO	1.3 km	MPC · JPL
505114	2012 DN_{58}	—	October 9, 2010	Mount Lemmon	Mount Lemmon Survey	·	580 m	MPC · JPL
505115	2012 DB_{59}	—	March 3, 2005	Kitt Peak	Spacewatch	·	790 m	MPC · JPL
505116	2012 DG_{64}	—	January 30, 2012	Kitt Peak	Spacewatch	·	670 m	MPC · JPL
505117	2012 DW_{69}	—	January 19, 2012	Haleakala	Pan-STARRS 1	·	790 m	MPC · JPL
505118	2012 DK_{81}	—	May 16, 2009	Mount Lemmon	Mount Lemmon Survey	·	570 m	MPC · JPL
505119	2012 DU_{83}	—	February 21, 2012	Kitt Peak	Spacewatch	·	1.3 km	MPC · JPL
505120	2012 DX_{90}	—	September 29, 2010	Mount Lemmon	Mount Lemmon Survey	·	580 m	MPC · JPL
505121	2012 EH_{2}	—	March 1, 2012	Mount Lemmon	Mount Lemmon Survey	NYS	1.2 km	MPC · JPL
505122	2012 EY_{10}	—	November 4, 2007	Kitt Peak	Spacewatch	·	640 m	MPC · JPL
505123	2012 FY_{26}	—	October 1, 2010	Kitt Peak	Spacewatch	·	650 m	MPC · JPL
505124	2012 FZ_{31}	—	February 25, 2012	Kitt Peak	Spacewatch	·	810 m	MPC · JPL
505125	2012 FU_{49}	—	September 12, 2007	Mount Lemmon	Mount Lemmon Survey	·	620 m	MPC · JPL
505126	2012 FH_{57}	—	September 30, 2006	Kitt Peak	Spacewatch	PHO	920 m	MPC · JPL
505127	2012 FO_{67}	—	March 27, 2012	Kitt Peak	Spacewatch	·	1.1 km	MPC · JPL
505128	2012 FU_{73}	—	March 13, 2005	Kitt Peak	Spacewatch	·	640 m	MPC · JPL
505129	2012 HB_{16}	—	December 19, 2007	Mount Lemmon	Mount Lemmon Survey	·	680 m	MPC · JPL
505130	2012 HU_{19}	—	January 30, 2012	Haleakala	Pan-STARRS 1	PHO	1.2 km	MPC · JPL
505131	2012 HZ_{19}	—	October 31, 2010	Mount Lemmon	Mount Lemmon Survey	·	950 m	MPC · JPL
505132	2012 HC_{28}	—	March 30, 2012	Kitt Peak	Spacewatch	PHO	1.1 km	MPC · JPL
505133	2012 HA_{47}	—	November 2, 2010	Mount Lemmon	Mount Lemmon Survey	·	1.1 km	MPC · JPL
505134	2012 HH_{48}	—	November 18, 2006	Kitt Peak	Spacewatch	PHO	980 m	MPC · JPL
505135	2012 HQ_{57}	—	April 17, 2012	Kitt Peak	Spacewatch	·	1.1 km	MPC · JPL
505136	2012 HJ_{58}	—	October 19, 2006	Kitt Peak	Spacewatch	NYS	1.3 km	MPC · JPL
505137	2012 JO_{32}	—	May 12, 2012	Mount Lemmon	Mount Lemmon Survey	·	1.1 km	MPC · JPL
505138	2012 JO_{48}	—	May 15, 2012	Mount Lemmon	Mount Lemmon Survey	·	1.2 km	MPC · JPL
505139	2012 JY_{53}	—	May 28, 2008	Mount Lemmon	Mount Lemmon Survey	·	820 m	MPC · JPL
505140	2012 KL_{2}	—	October 22, 2006	Kitt Peak	Spacewatch	PHO	860 m	MPC · JPL
505141	2012 KR_{16}	—	May 20, 2012	Mount Lemmon	Mount Lemmon Survey	·	1.6 km	MPC · JPL
505142	2012 LA_{8}	—	May 21, 2012	Mount Lemmon	Mount Lemmon Survey	·	2.0 km	MPC · JPL
505143	2012 LX_{11}	—	February 8, 2011	Mount Lemmon	Mount Lemmon Survey	·	1.1 km	MPC · JPL
505144	2012 LA_{19}	—	May 21, 2012	Haleakala	Pan-STARRS 1	·	1.4 km	MPC · JPL
505145	2012 MF_{13}	—	June 16, 2012	Haleakala	Pan-STARRS 1	·	1.4 km	MPC · JPL
505146	2012 OU_{2}	—	October 3, 2003	Kitt Peak	Spacewatch	·	2.1 km	MPC · JPL
505147	2012 PG_{1}	—	August 8, 2012	Haleakala	Pan-STARRS 1	HNS	1.1 km	MPC · JPL
505148	2012 PR_{7}	—	May 23, 2006	Kitt Peak	Spacewatch	·	1.8 km	MPC · JPL
505149	2012 PU_{8}	—	September 14, 1999	Kitt Peak	Spacewatch	·	1.6 km	MPC · JPL
505150	2012 PW_{9}	—	October 23, 2008	Mount Lemmon	Mount Lemmon Survey	·	1.8 km	MPC · JPL
505151	2012 PZ_{11}	—	August 10, 2012	Kitt Peak	Spacewatch	·	1.6 km	MPC · JPL
505152	2012 PT_{20}	—	September 4, 2007	Mount Lemmon	Mount Lemmon Survey	KOR	1.1 km	MPC · JPL
505153	2012 PZ_{21}	—	September 16, 2003	Kitt Peak	Spacewatch	GEF	1.1 km	MPC · JPL
505154	2012 PK_{22}	—	August 6, 2012	Haleakala	Pan-STARRS 1	·	1.9 km	MPC · JPL
505155	2012 QL_{1}	—	March 31, 2011	Mayhill	L. Elenin	·	2.5 km	MPC · JPL
505156	2012 QE_{22}	—	August 14, 2012	Kitt Peak	Spacewatch	·	1.5 km	MPC · JPL
505157	2012 QZ_{25}	—	May 13, 2011	Haleakala	Pan-STARRS 1	·	2.9 km	MPC · JPL
505158	2012 QM_{49}	—	April 24, 2011	Mount Lemmon	Mount Lemmon Survey	·	2.1 km	MPC · JPL
505159	2012 QN_{49}	—	August 8, 2012	Haleakala	Pan-STARRS 1	·	1.8 km	MPC · JPL
505160	2012 RE_{12}	—	August 12, 2012	Catalina	CSS	·	2.4 km	MPC · JPL
505161	2012 RV_{18}	—	September 12, 2012	La Sagra	OAM	GEF	1.3 km	MPC · JPL
505162	2012 RL_{39}	—	September 21, 2003	Kitt Peak	Spacewatch	·	1.8 km	MPC · JPL
505163	2012 SP_{12}	—	September 17, 2012	Kitt Peak	Spacewatch	KOR	1.1 km	MPC · JPL
505164	2012 SY_{16}	—	October 22, 2001	Socorro	LINEAR	·	2.4 km	MPC · JPL
505165	2012 SU_{26}	—	September 17, 2012	Mount Lemmon	Mount Lemmon Survey	·	1.7 km	MPC · JPL
505166	2012 SW_{33}	—	February 14, 2010	Mount Lemmon	Mount Lemmon Survey	·	2.2 km	MPC · JPL
505167	2012 SZ_{38}	—	September 18, 2012	Mount Lemmon	Mount Lemmon Survey	AGN	1.1 km	MPC · JPL
505168	2012 SJ_{53}	—	April 5, 2011	Kitt Peak	Spacewatch	AEO	1.0 km	MPC · JPL
505169	2012 SQ_{56}	—	September 22, 2012	Socorro	LINEAR	T_{j} (2.82) · AMO +1km	980 m	MPC · JPL
505170	2012 TS_{22}	—	October 9, 2007	Kitt Peak	Spacewatch	·	1.6 km	MPC · JPL
505171	2012 TE_{31}	—	September 19, 2012	Mount Lemmon	Mount Lemmon Survey	615	1.3 km	MPC · JPL
505172	2012 TH_{31}	—	February 23, 2011	Catalina	CSS	H	510 m	MPC · JPL
505173	2012 TK_{31}	—	October 19, 2003	Kitt Peak	Spacewatch	·	2.1 km	MPC · JPL
505174	2012 TC_{32}	—	April 6, 2010	Mount Lemmon	Mount Lemmon Survey	·	2.8 km	MPC · JPL
505175	2012 TW_{38}	—	May 11, 2010	Kitt Peak	Spacewatch	·	3.4 km	MPC · JPL
505176	2012 TG_{48}	—	September 21, 2012	Kitt Peak	Spacewatch	·	2.7 km	MPC · JPL
505177	2012 TG_{51}	—	October 8, 2012	Haleakala	Pan-STARRS 1	·	1.7 km	MPC · JPL
505178	2012 TV_{78}	—	October 8, 2012	Haleakala	Pan-STARRS 1	APO · PHA	460 m	MPC · JPL
505179	2012 TO_{80}	—	September 28, 2003	Kitt Peak	Spacewatch	AGN	870 m	MPC · JPL
505180	2012 TQ_{87}	—	May 25, 2006	Mount Lemmon	Mount Lemmon Survey	·	1.7 km	MPC · JPL
505181	2012 TU_{101}	—	October 10, 2007	Mount Lemmon	Mount Lemmon Survey	·	1.9 km	MPC · JPL
505182	2012 TO_{108}	—	June 22, 2011	Mount Lemmon	Mount Lemmon Survey	TIR	2.2 km	MPC · JPL
505183	2012 TQ_{108}	—	October 11, 2007	Kitt Peak	Spacewatch	·	1.9 km	MPC · JPL
505184	2012 TW_{110}	—	September 21, 2012	Kitt Peak	Spacewatch	·	1.7 km	MPC · JPL
505185	2012 TW_{113}	—	September 25, 2012	Kitt Peak	Spacewatch	GEF	1.1 km	MPC · JPL
505186	2012 TW_{114}	—	September 21, 2012	Kitt Peak	Spacewatch	·	1.7 km	MPC · JPL
505187	2012 TC_{120}	—	October 15, 2001	Kitt Peak	Spacewatch	·	2.6 km	MPC · JPL
505188	2012 TJ_{126}	—	September 10, 2007	Mount Lemmon	Mount Lemmon Survey	·	1.6 km	MPC · JPL
505189	2012 TL_{126}	—	October 4, 2012	Mount Lemmon	Mount Lemmon Survey	EOS	1.6 km	MPC · JPL
505190	2012 TH_{133}	—	October 5, 2012	Haleakala	Pan-STARRS 1	HOF	2.4 km	MPC · JPL
505191	2012 TJ_{133}	—	September 16, 2012	Kitt Peak	Spacewatch	·	1.9 km	MPC · JPL
505192	2012 TP_{136}	—	October 30, 2002	Kitt Peak	Spacewatch	EOS	1.9 km	MPC · JPL
505193	2012 TT_{136}	—	October 8, 2012	Mount Lemmon	Mount Lemmon Survey	·	1.8 km	MPC · JPL
505194	2012 TZ_{141}	—	September 14, 2007	Mount Lemmon	Mount Lemmon Survey	·	1.5 km	MPC · JPL
505195	2012 TL_{145}	—	October 10, 2012	Mount Lemmon	Mount Lemmon Survey	·	2.6 km	MPC · JPL
505196	2012 TU_{145}	—	September 18, 2012	Kitt Peak	Spacewatch	H	540 m	MPC · JPL
505197	2012 TU_{152}	—	March 18, 2010	Kitt Peak	Spacewatch	·	1.6 km	MPC · JPL
505198	2012 TN_{158}	—	October 8, 2012	Mount Lemmon	Mount Lemmon Survey	BRA	1.3 km	MPC · JPL
505199	2012 TP_{159}	—	March 18, 2010	Mount Lemmon	Mount Lemmon Survey	·	1.7 km	MPC · JPL
505200	2012 TK_{164}	—	August 10, 2007	Kitt Peak	Spacewatch	AGN	1.1 km	MPC · JPL

== 505201–505300 ==
back to top

Designation			Discovery			Properties		Ref
Permanent	Provisional	Named after	Date	Site	Discoverer(s)	Category	Diam.	Ref
505201	2012 TY_{166}	—	October 8, 2012	Haleakala	Pan-STARRS 1	·	1.9 km	MPC · JPL
505202	2012 TQ_{174}	—	October 10, 2007	Kitt Peak	Spacewatch	·	1.4 km	MPC · JPL
505203	2012 TF_{187}	—	October 9, 2012	Mount Lemmon	Mount Lemmon Survey	·	2.6 km	MPC · JPL
505204	2012 TP_{187}	—	October 9, 2012	Mount Lemmon	Mount Lemmon Survey	·	2.5 km	MPC · JPL
505205	2012 TP_{195}	—	September 21, 2012	Kitt Peak	Spacewatch	·	3.0 km	MPC · JPL
505206	2012 TV_{237}	—	October 7, 2012	Haleakala	Pan-STARRS 1	AGN	1.4 km	MPC · JPL
505207	2012 TA_{238}	—	October 8, 2007	Mount Lemmon	Mount Lemmon Survey	H	410 m	MPC · JPL
505208	2012 TJ_{238}	—	October 7, 2012	Haleakala	Pan-STARRS 1	AGN	1.2 km	MPC · JPL
505209	2012 TK_{244}	—	September 11, 2007	Mount Lemmon	Mount Lemmon Survey	·	2.0 km	MPC · JPL
505210	2012 TO_{254}	—	September 17, 2006	Kitt Peak	Spacewatch	EOS	1.8 km	MPC · JPL
505211	2012 TG_{259}	—	September 21, 2012	Mount Lemmon	Mount Lemmon Survey	·	1.5 km	MPC · JPL
505212	2012 TZ_{260}	—	September 10, 2007	Mount Lemmon	Mount Lemmon Survey	·	1.6 km	MPC · JPL
505213	2012 TC_{261}	—	October 7, 2012	Haleakala	Pan-STARRS 1	·	1.6 km	MPC · JPL
505214	2012 TB_{275}	—	November 4, 2007	Kitt Peak	Spacewatch	·	2.7 km	MPC · JPL
505215	2012 TO_{280}	—	November 7, 2007	Mount Lemmon	Mount Lemmon Survey	EOS	1.7 km	MPC · JPL
505216	2012 TE_{287}	—	September 25, 2012	Mount Lemmon	Mount Lemmon Survey	·	2.0 km	MPC · JPL
505217	2012 TC_{297}	—	May 8, 2011	Mount Lemmon	Mount Lemmon Survey	DOR	2.5 km	MPC · JPL
505218	2012 TY_{301}	—	November 20, 2003	Kitt Peak	Spacewatch	·	2.0 km	MPC · JPL
505219	2012 TF_{304}	—	September 23, 2012	Kitt Peak	Spacewatch	·	1.9 km	MPC · JPL
505220	2012 TY_{305}	—	September 14, 2007	Mount Lemmon	Mount Lemmon Survey	·	1.8 km	MPC · JPL
505221	2012 TL_{306}	—	May 24, 2011	Haleakala	Pan-STARRS 1	·	1.9 km	MPC · JPL
505222	2012 TT_{309}	—	October 7, 2007	Mount Lemmon	Mount Lemmon Survey	EOS	1.8 km	MPC · JPL
505223	2012 TQ_{311}	—	April 7, 2006	Mount Lemmon	Mount Lemmon Survey	H	360 m	MPC · JPL
505224	2012 TX_{319}	—	October 9, 2012	Haleakala	Pan-STARRS 1	H	540 m	MPC · JPL
505225	2012 US	—	September 18, 2007	Kitt Peak	Spacewatch	H	340 m	MPC · JPL
505226	2012 UZ_{6}	—	January 7, 2009	Kitt Peak	Spacewatch	·	1.7 km	MPC · JPL
505227	2012 UM_{12}	—	October 10, 2007	Mount Lemmon	Mount Lemmon Survey	EOS	1.3 km	MPC · JPL
505228	2012 UU_{13}	—	October 7, 2012	Haleakala	Pan-STARRS 1	·	2.2 km	MPC · JPL
505229	2012 UD_{24}	—	November 16, 2007	Mount Lemmon	Mount Lemmon Survey	·	1.6 km	MPC · JPL
505230	2012 UE_{29}	—	October 8, 2012	Haleakala	Pan-STARRS 1	EOS	1.7 km	MPC · JPL
505231	2012 UR_{30}	—	October 16, 2012	Kitt Peak	Spacewatch	·	1.8 km	MPC · JPL
505232	2012 UK_{35}	—	October 8, 2012	Mount Lemmon	Mount Lemmon Survey	·	1.9 km	MPC · JPL
505233	2012 UO_{37}	—	November 13, 2007	Kitt Peak	Spacewatch	·	2.9 km	MPC · JPL
505234	2012 UO_{44}	—	October 18, 2012	Mount Lemmon	Mount Lemmon Survey	·	2.6 km	MPC · JPL
505235	2012 UQ_{55}	—	October 15, 2007	Kitt Peak	Spacewatch	·	2.3 km	MPC · JPL
505236	2012 UQ_{57}	—	November 4, 2007	Kitt Peak	Spacewatch	KOR	1.1 km	MPC · JPL
505237	2012 US_{58}	—	October 19, 2012	Haleakala	Pan-STARRS 1	EOS	1.7 km	MPC · JPL
505238	2012 UU_{60}	—	May 8, 2005	Kitt Peak	Spacewatch	·	2.4 km	MPC · JPL
505239	2012 UX_{60}	—	October 16, 2012	Kitt Peak	Spacewatch	·	2.2 km	MPC · JPL
505240	2012 UE_{66}	—	October 20, 2012	Kitt Peak	Spacewatch	THB	2.3 km	MPC · JPL
505241	2012 UO_{70}	—	October 19, 2003	Kitt Peak	Spacewatch	AGN	1.1 km	MPC · JPL
505242	2012 UW_{73}	—	October 17, 2012	Haleakala	Pan-STARRS 1	·	1.5 km	MPC · JPL
505243	2012 UB_{88}	—	August 2, 2011	Haleakala	Pan-STARRS 1	EOS	1.4 km	MPC · JPL
505244	2012 UU_{96}	—	March 16, 2009	Kitt Peak	Spacewatch	·	2.3 km	MPC · JPL
505245	2012 UV_{105}	—	October 9, 2007	Kitt Peak	Spacewatch	EOS	1.4 km	MPC · JPL
505246	2012 UL_{112}	—	October 8, 2007	Anderson Mesa	LONEOS	BRA	1.6 km	MPC · JPL
505247	2012 UW_{112}	—	September 14, 2007	Mount Lemmon	Mount Lemmon Survey	·	2.0 km	MPC · JPL
505248	2012 UK_{118}	—	September 17, 2012	Kitt Peak	Spacewatch	·	3.2 km	MPC · JPL
505249	2012 UT_{122}	—	November 9, 2007	Kitt Peak	Spacewatch	·	1.3 km	MPC · JPL
505250	2012 UM_{123}	—	October 22, 2012	Haleakala	Pan-STARRS 1	EOS	1.8 km	MPC · JPL
505251	2012 UJ_{124}	—	October 22, 2012	Haleakala	Pan-STARRS 1	·	2.7 km	MPC · JPL
505252	2012 UT_{126}	—	September 19, 2001	Socorro	LINEAR	·	3.2 km	MPC · JPL
505253	2012 UW_{126}	—	October 22, 2012	Haleakala	Pan-STARRS 1	·	3.0 km	MPC · JPL
505254	2012 UW_{142}	—	September 14, 2007	Mount Lemmon	Mount Lemmon Survey	·	1.8 km	MPC · JPL
505255	2012 UY_{144}	—	October 8, 2012	Haleakala	Pan-STARRS 1	HNS	1.1 km	MPC · JPL
505256	2012 UD_{146}	—	January 20, 2009	Mount Lemmon	Mount Lemmon Survey	EOS	1.7 km	MPC · JPL
505257	2012 UF_{146}	—	June 29, 2005	Kitt Peak	Spacewatch	·	2.7 km	MPC · JPL
505258	2012 UK_{149}	—	October 8, 2012	Mount Lemmon	Mount Lemmon Survey	·	2.6 km	MPC · JPL
505259	2012 UY_{155}	—	October 10, 2012	Kitt Peak	Spacewatch	·	2.8 km	MPC · JPL
505260	2012 UR_{163}	—	November 2, 2007	Kitt Peak	Spacewatch	·	1.5 km	MPC · JPL
505261	2012 UF_{166}	—	January 30, 2008	Mount Lemmon	Mount Lemmon Survey	H	520 m	MPC · JPL
505262	2012 UH_{166}	—	February 10, 2011	Catalina	CSS	H	500 m	MPC · JPL
505263	2012 US_{167}	—	October 10, 2012	Haleakala	Pan-STARRS 1	H	400 m	MPC · JPL
505264	2012 UC_{174}	—	December 4, 2007	Catalina	CSS	H	500 m	MPC · JPL
505265	2012 VW	—	August 26, 2012	Kitt Peak	Spacewatch	·	1.9 km	MPC · JPL
505266	2012 VL_{1}	—	October 6, 2012	Haleakala	Pan-STARRS 1	·	2.0 km	MPC · JPL
505267	2012 VA_{16}	—	October 12, 1994	Kitt Peak	Spacewatch	·	2.1 km	MPC · JPL
505268	2012 VW_{16}	—	October 23, 2012	Mount Lemmon	Mount Lemmon Survey	H	470 m	MPC · JPL
505269	2012 VH_{17}	—	November 5, 2012	Kitt Peak	Spacewatch	H	450 m	MPC · JPL
505270	2012 VZ_{17}	—	September 17, 2006	Kitt Peak	Spacewatch	·	2.5 km	MPC · JPL
505271	2012 VE_{20}	—	April 1, 2011	Mount Lemmon	Mount Lemmon Survey	H	310 m	MPC · JPL
505272	2012 VX_{25}	—	November 6, 2012	Haleakala	Pan-STARRS 1	H	540 m	MPC · JPL
505273	2012 VV_{30}	—	October 21, 2012	Haleakala	Pan-STARRS 1	·	3.1 km	MPC · JPL
505274	2012 VE_{32}	—	April 30, 2011	Haleakala	Pan-STARRS 1	H	490 m	MPC · JPL
505275	2012 VU_{32}	—	May 19, 2006	Catalina	CSS	H	480 m	MPC · JPL
505276	2012 VV_{32}	—	April 14, 2011	Haleakala	Pan-STARRS 1	H	400 m	MPC · JPL
505277	2012 VJ_{36}	—	October 20, 2012	Mount Lemmon	Mount Lemmon Survey	·	2.1 km	MPC · JPL
505278	2012 VQ_{38}	—	November 5, 2007	Kitt Peak	Spacewatch	H	540 m	MPC · JPL
505279	2012 VH_{43}	—	August 4, 2011	La Sagra	OAM	·	2.3 km	MPC · JPL
505280	2012 VM_{48}	—	September 16, 2012	Mount Lemmon	Mount Lemmon Survey	·	1.9 km	MPC · JPL
505281	2012 VE_{51}	—	October 18, 2012	Haleakala	Pan-STARRS 1	BRA	1.4 km	MPC · JPL
505282	2012 VQ_{70}	—	October 20, 2012	Mount Lemmon	Mount Lemmon Survey	·	2.2 km	MPC · JPL
505283	2012 VH_{72}	—	June 14, 2010	Mount Lemmon	Mount Lemmon Survey	·	2.6 km	MPC · JPL
505284	2012 VM_{74}	—	October 22, 2012	Haleakala	Pan-STARRS 1	EOS	2.1 km	MPC · JPL
505285	2012 VP_{79}	—	October 22, 2012	Haleakala	Pan-STARRS 1	H	260 m	MPC · JPL
505286	2012 VJ_{81}	—	October 22, 2012	Haleakala	Pan-STARRS 1	·	2.2 km	MPC · JPL
505287	2012 VF_{86}	—	March 11, 2010	WISE	WISE	·	3.3 km	MPC · JPL
505288	2012 VU_{88}	—	October 25, 2012	Kitt Peak	Spacewatch	·	2.4 km	MPC · JPL
505289	2012 VA_{98}	—	October 15, 2012	Kitt Peak	Spacewatch	·	3.2 km	MPC · JPL
505290	2012 VO_{99}	—	October 7, 2012	Kitt Peak	Spacewatch	·	2.1 km	MPC · JPL
505291	2012 VU_{107}	—	November 12, 2012	Mount Lemmon	Mount Lemmon Survey	·	3.6 km	MPC · JPL
505292	2012 VQ_{108}	—	October 22, 2012	Haleakala	Pan-STARRS 1	ARM	3.2 km	MPC · JPL
505293	2012 WL_{6}	—	December 31, 2007	Mount Lemmon	Mount Lemmon Survey	·	1.8 km	MPC · JPL
505294	2012 WJ_{12}	—	October 9, 2012	Mount Lemmon	Mount Lemmon Survey	·	2.5 km	MPC · JPL
505295	2012 WG_{18}	—	October 9, 2012	Mount Lemmon	Mount Lemmon Survey	·	2.0 km	MPC · JPL
505296	2012 WL_{18}	—	August 29, 2006	Kitt Peak	Spacewatch	·	1.6 km	MPC · JPL
505297	2012 WP_{22}	—	December 3, 2007	Kitt Peak	Spacewatch	·	1.3 km	MPC · JPL
505298	2012 WJ_{24}	—	November 20, 2001	Socorro	LINEAR	·	2.5 km	MPC · JPL
505299	2012 WM_{26}	—	November 6, 2012	Kitt Peak	Spacewatch	EOS	1.6 km	MPC · JPL
505300	2012 WJ_{28}	—	November 6, 2012	Kitt Peak	Spacewatch	·	3.5 km	MPC · JPL

== 505301–505400 ==
back to top

Designation			Discovery			Properties		Ref
Permanent	Provisional	Named after	Date	Site	Discoverer(s)	Category	Diam.	Ref
505301	2012 XB_{17}	—	April 24, 2011	Haleakala	Pan-STARRS 1	H	620 m	MPC · JPL
505302	2012 XU_{21}	—	January 16, 2008	Mount Lemmon	Mount Lemmon Survey	·	2.6 km	MPC · JPL
505303	2012 XD_{23}	—	November 7, 2007	Kitt Peak	Spacewatch	·	1.7 km	MPC · JPL
505304	2012 XH_{34}	—	December 3, 2012	Mount Lemmon	Mount Lemmon Survey	·	1.6 km	MPC · JPL
505305	2012 XA_{40}	—	January 1, 2008	Kitt Peak	Spacewatch	·	2.1 km	MPC · JPL
505306	2012 XD_{40}	—	September 19, 2011	Haleakala	Pan-STARRS 1	·	2.8 km	MPC · JPL
505307	2012 XS_{42}	—	December 3, 2012	Mount Lemmon	Mount Lemmon Survey	·	3.3 km	MPC · JPL
505308	2012 XZ_{45}	—	November 13, 2007	Kitt Peak	Spacewatch	·	1.5 km	MPC · JPL
505309	2012 XO_{47}	—	December 4, 2012	Kitt Peak	Spacewatch	H	490 m	MPC · JPL
505310	2012 XW_{54}	—	May 8, 2011	Mount Lemmon	Mount Lemmon Survey	H	440 m	MPC · JPL
505311	2012 XH_{60}	—	October 21, 2012	Haleakala	Pan-STARRS 1	·	1.7 km	MPC · JPL
505312	2012 XW_{63}	—	October 17, 2012	Mount Lemmon	Mount Lemmon Survey	·	2.7 km	MPC · JPL
505313	2012 XZ_{77}	—	September 19, 2006	Kitt Peak	Spacewatch	·	1.9 km	MPC · JPL
505314	2012 XO_{84}	—	November 17, 2006	Mount Lemmon	Mount Lemmon Survey	·	2.1 km	MPC · JPL
505315	2012 XY_{91}	—	February 28, 2009	Kitt Peak	Spacewatch	·	1.5 km	MPC · JPL
505316	2012 XQ_{109}	—	December 19, 2007	Mount Lemmon	Mount Lemmon Survey	EOS	1.6 km	MPC · JPL
505317	2012 XG_{128}	—	December 10, 2012	Haleakala	Pan-STARRS 1	H	410 m	MPC · JPL
505318	2012 XH_{131}	—	September 17, 2006	Catalina	CSS	·	4.0 km	MPC · JPL
505319	2012 XB_{134}	—	October 19, 2007	Mount Lemmon	Mount Lemmon Survey	·	2.6 km	MPC · JPL
505320	2012 XF_{136}	—	December 18, 2001	Socorro	LINEAR	·	2.2 km	MPC · JPL
505321	2012 XR_{141}	—	September 18, 2006	Kitt Peak	Spacewatch	HYG	2.5 km	MPC · JPL
505322	2012 XC_{149}	—	September 20, 2011	Haleakala	Pan-STARRS 1	·	3.4 km	MPC · JPL
505323	2012 XX_{151}	—	December 19, 2001	Socorro	LINEAR	·	2.6 km	MPC · JPL
505324	2012 XZ_{152}	—	July 26, 2011	Haleakala	Pan-STARRS 1	·	2.1 km	MPC · JPL
505325	2012 YH_{6}	—	December 10, 2004	Socorro	LINEAR	H	470 m	MPC · JPL
505326	2012 YQ_{6}	—	December 21, 2012	Haleakala	Pan-STARRS 1	H	480 m	MPC · JPL
505327	2012 YY_{8}	—	September 27, 2012	Haleakala	Pan-STARRS 1	T_{j} (2.98)	3.6 km	MPC · JPL
505328	2013 AY_{1}	—	December 9, 2012	Haleakala	Pan-STARRS 1	EOS	1.8 km	MPC · JPL
505329	2013 AC_{6}	—	August 23, 2011	Haleakala	Pan-STARRS 1	·	2.2 km	MPC · JPL
505330	2013 AH_{6}	—	November 7, 2007	Mount Lemmon	Mount Lemmon Survey	·	2.3 km	MPC · JPL
505331	2013 AQ_{14}	—	November 20, 2006	Catalina	CSS	THB	2.6 km	MPC · JPL
505332	2013 AY_{15}	—	February 8, 2002	Kitt Peak	Spacewatch	THB	2.4 km	MPC · JPL
505333	2013 AR_{20}	—	January 1, 2013	Haleakala	Pan-STARRS 1	H	440 m	MPC · JPL
505334	2013 AT_{20}	—	February 12, 2008	Mount Lemmon	Mount Lemmon Survey	·	2.7 km	MPC · JPL
505335	2013 AH_{27}	—	October 15, 2004	Mount Lemmon	Mount Lemmon Survey	·	350 m	MPC · JPL
505336	2013 AJ_{36}	—	November 23, 2006	Mount Lemmon	Mount Lemmon Survey	·	2.5 km	MPC · JPL
505337	2013 AM_{50}	—	January 19, 2005	Kitt Peak	Spacewatch	H	550 m	MPC · JPL
505338	2013 AJ_{74}	—	September 19, 2011	Haleakala	Pan-STARRS 1	TIR	2.9 km	MPC · JPL
505339	2013 AX_{88}	—	January 14, 2013	Catalina	CSS	H	530 m	MPC · JPL
505340	2013 AQ_{93}	—	January 9, 2013	Kitt Peak	Spacewatch	·	2.7 km	MPC · JPL
505341	2013 AX_{111}	—	December 24, 2012	Haleakala	Pan-STARRS 1	H	440 m	MPC · JPL
505342	2013 AO_{125}	—	February 10, 2008	Kitt Peak	Spacewatch	·	2.7 km	MPC · JPL
505343	2013 AG_{128}	—	March 9, 2008	Mount Lemmon	Mount Lemmon Survey	LIX	3.1 km	MPC · JPL
505344	2013 AD_{157}	—	June 9, 2011	Haleakala	Pan-STARRS 1	LIX	3.9 km	MPC · JPL
505345	2013 AV_{183}	—	January 8, 2013	Haleakala	Pan-STARRS 1	H	420 m	MPC · JPL
505346	2013 AD_{184}	—	January 9, 2013	Mount Lemmon	Mount Lemmon Survey	H	610 m	MPC · JPL
505347	2013 BM_{56}	—	May 15, 2010	WISE	WISE	·	4.1 km	MPC · JPL
505348	2013 BL_{70}	—	January 17, 2013	Catalina	CSS	·	400 m	MPC · JPL
505349	2013 CT	—	July 20, 2006	Siding Spring	SSS	H	540 m	MPC · JPL
505350	2013 CA_{20}	—	November 27, 2000	Kitt Peak	Spacewatch	·	2.8 km	MPC · JPL
505351	2013 CB_{35}	—	August 22, 2011	Haleakala	Pan-STARRS 1	H	550 m	MPC · JPL
505352	2013 CO_{36}	—	August 21, 2001	Socorro	LINEAR	H	580 m	MPC · JPL
505353	2013 CK_{47}	—	January 14, 2013	Mount Lemmon	Mount Lemmon Survey	H	420 m	MPC · JPL
505354	2013 CJ_{82}	—	February 8, 2013	Haleakala	Pan-STARRS 1	·	1.1 km	MPC · JPL
505355	2013 CN_{130}	—	February 13, 2013	Haleakala	Pan-STARRS 1	·	380 m	MPC · JPL
505356	2013 CK_{193}	—	January 10, 2013	Kitt Peak	Spacewatch	·	3.1 km	MPC · JPL
505357	2013 DN_{12}	—	September 26, 2011	Haleakala	Pan-STARRS 1	THB	2.1 km	MPC · JPL
505358	2013 EM_{31}	—	March 7, 2013	Kitt Peak	Spacewatch	H	630 m	MPC · JPL
505359	2013 EO_{66}	—	January 26, 2012	Haleakala	Pan-STARRS 1	3:2	6.1 km	MPC · JPL
505360	2013 EW_{120}	—	September 15, 2004	Kitt Peak	Spacewatch	·	490 m	MPC · JPL
505361	2013 EV_{126}	—	March 13, 2013	Catalina	CSS	H	480 m	MPC · JPL
505362	2013 FA_{9}	—	March 13, 2007	Catalina	CSS	T_{j} (2.99)	3.2 km	MPC · JPL
505363	2013 GA_{1}	—	March 24, 2013	Mount Lemmon	Mount Lemmon Survey	·	1.2 km	MPC · JPL
505364	2013 GO_{10}	—	March 5, 2006	Kitt Peak	Spacewatch	PHO	630 m	MPC · JPL
505365	2013 GQ_{10}	—	March 5, 2013	Kitt Peak	Spacewatch	H	490 m	MPC · JPL
505366	2013 GV_{67}	—	February 21, 2013	Haleakala	Pan-STARRS 1	HNS	1.1 km	MPC · JPL
505367	2013 GU_{122}	—	April 10, 2013	Haleakala	Pan-STARRS 1	·	780 m	MPC · JPL
505368	2013 HB_{11}	—	April 20, 2013	Mount Lemmon	Mount Lemmon Survey	PHO	970 m	MPC · JPL
505369	2013 HX_{23}	—	April 16, 2013	Siding Spring	SSS	·	660 m	MPC · JPL
505370	2013 HN_{37}	—	April 9, 2013	Haleakala	Pan-STARRS 1	·	810 m	MPC · JPL
505371	2013 HU_{40}	—	August 10, 2007	Kitt Peak	Spacewatch	·	560 m	MPC · JPL
505372	2013 HV_{40}	—	August 9, 2007	Socorro	LINEAR	·	470 m	MPC · JPL
505373	2013 HC_{49}	—	April 9, 2013	Haleakala	Pan-STARRS 1	·	550 m	MPC · JPL
505374	2013 HU_{76}	—	September 15, 2007	Mount Lemmon	Mount Lemmon Survey	·	600 m	MPC · JPL
505375	2013 HW_{76}	—	April 9, 2013	Haleakala	Pan-STARRS 1	·	1.6 km	MPC · JPL
505376	2013 HV_{104}	—	March 9, 2005	Mount Lemmon	Mount Lemmon Survey	3:2 · (6124)	4.5 km	MPC · JPL
505377	2013 HH_{131}	—	April 9, 2013	Haleakala	Pan-STARRS 1	·	830 m	MPC · JPL
505378	2013 HJ_{153}	—	April 14, 2007	Kitt Peak	Spacewatch	CYB	3.5 km	MPC · JPL
505379	2013 JM_{2}	—	September 10, 2007	Kitt Peak	Spacewatch	·	530 m	MPC · JPL
505380	2013 JH_{25}	—	May 9, 2013	Haleakala	Pan-STARRS 1	·	830 m	MPC · JPL
505381	2013 JX_{46}	—	June 11, 2010	WISE	WISE	·	650 m	MPC · JPL
505382	2013 KR_{16}	—	May 2, 2003	Kitt Peak	Spacewatch	·	620 m	MPC · JPL
505383	2013 MM_{9}	—	June 18, 2013	Haleakala	Pan-STARRS 1	·	880 m	MPC · JPL
505384	2013 NA	—	June 7, 2013	Haleakala	Pan-STARRS 1	·	650 m	MPC · JPL
505385	2013 OE_{6}	—	July 28, 2013	Kitt Peak	Spacewatch	·	1.1 km	MPC · JPL
505386	2013 PA_{11}	—	July 2, 2013	Črni Vrh	Mikuž, H.	·	1.3 km	MPC · JPL
505387	2013 PS_{18}	—	January 19, 2012	Haleakala	Pan-STARRS 1	·	880 m	MPC · JPL
505388	2013 PD_{27}	—	December 30, 2007	Mount Lemmon	Mount Lemmon Survey	V	650 m	MPC · JPL
505389	2013 PL_{34}	—	November 19, 2007	Mount Lemmon	Mount Lemmon Survey	·	730 m	MPC · JPL
505390	2013 PD_{35}	—	September 14, 1998	Kitt Peak	Spacewatch	·	870 m	MPC · JPL
505391	2013 PE_{38}	—	March 13, 2012	Mount Lemmon	Mount Lemmon Survey	·	970 m	MPC · JPL
505392	2013 PF_{38}	—	August 9, 2013	Kitt Peak	Spacewatch	·	930 m	MPC · JPL
505393	2013 PS_{49}	—	October 26, 2005	Kitt Peak	Spacewatch	(5)	890 m	MPC · JPL
505394	2013 PE_{57}	—	February 28, 2012	Haleakala	Pan-STARRS 1	PHO	880 m	MPC · JPL
505395	2013 QC_{4}	—	August 12, 2013	Kitt Peak	Spacewatch	NYS	980 m	MPC · JPL
505396	2013 QD_{17}	—	August 29, 2013	Haleakala	Pan-STARRS 1	PHO	740 m	MPC · JPL
505397	2013 QZ_{23}	—	May 7, 2005	Kitt Peak	Spacewatch	MAS	570 m	MPC · JPL
505398	2013 QQ_{28}	—	November 17, 2006	Kitt Peak	Spacewatch	MAS	620 m	MPC · JPL
505399	2013 QR_{41}	—	October 13, 2010	Mount Lemmon	Mount Lemmon Survey	·	800 m	MPC · JPL
505400	2013 QE_{54}	—	February 13, 2008	Kitt Peak	Spacewatch	PHO	750 m	MPC · JPL

== 505401–505500 ==
back to top

Designation			Discovery			Properties		Ref
Permanent	Provisional	Named after	Date	Site	Discoverer(s)	Category	Diam.	Ref
505401	2013 QC_{62}	—	June 19, 2013	Mount Lemmon	Mount Lemmon Survey	·	930 m	MPC · JPL
505402	2013 QS_{65}	—	August 27, 2013	Haleakala	Pan-STARRS 1	·	1.2 km	MPC · JPL
505403	2013 QL_{68}	—	March 9, 2005	Mount Lemmon	Mount Lemmon Survey	MAS	680 m	MPC · JPL
505404	2013 QY_{73}	—	August 26, 2013	Haleakala	Pan-STARRS 1	·	1.1 km	MPC · JPL
505405	2013 QO_{76}	—	March 16, 2012	Mount Lemmon	Mount Lemmon Survey	·	880 m	MPC · JPL
505406	2013 QY_{78}	—	October 21, 2006	Kitt Peak	Spacewatch	·	770 m	MPC · JPL
505407	2013 QA_{84}	—	August 25, 2005	Campo Imperatore	CINEOS	·	720 m	MPC · JPL
505408	2013 QM_{84}	—	February 8, 2011	Mount Lemmon	Mount Lemmon Survey	PHO	940 m	MPC · JPL
505409	2013 QK_{91}	—	July 14, 2013	Haleakala	Pan-STARRS 1	·	680 m	MPC · JPL
505410	2013 QC_{92}	—	March 15, 2012	Mount Lemmon	Mount Lemmon Survey	·	920 m	MPC · JPL
505411	2013 QX_{92}	—	June 19, 2009	Kitt Peak	Spacewatch	·	900 m	MPC · JPL
505412	2013 QO_{95}	—	September 24, 2013	Cerro Tololo	Dark Energy Survey	cubewano (hot)	212 km	MPC · JPL
505413	2013 RO_{4}	—	December 1, 2006	Mount Lemmon	Mount Lemmon Survey	·	1.2 km	MPC · JPL
505414	2013 RY_{6}	—	November 4, 2002	Kitt Peak	Spacewatch	NYS	1.0 km	MPC · JPL
505415	2013 RL_{8}	—	August 15, 2013	Haleakala	Pan-STARRS 1	·	1.3 km	MPC · JPL
505416	2013 RT_{16}	—	September 26, 1998	Socorro	LINEAR	·	2.3 km	MPC · JPL
505417	2013 RZ_{17}	—	March 16, 2012	Mount Lemmon	Mount Lemmon Survey	·	1.2 km	MPC · JPL
505418	2013 RH_{19}	—	September 3, 2013	Catalina	CSS	·	1.2 km	MPC · JPL
505419	2013 RE_{22}	—	September 2, 2013	Catalina	CSS	EUN	1.2 km	MPC · JPL
505420	2013 RT_{25}	—	February 8, 2008	Kitt Peak	Spacewatch	V	670 m	MPC · JPL
505421	2013 RE_{31}	—	July 27, 2009	Catalina	CSS	V	840 m	MPC · JPL
505422	2013 RA_{32}	—	February 7, 2011	Mount Lemmon	Mount Lemmon Survey	V	690 m	MPC · JPL
505423	2013 RS_{36}	—	March 27, 2008	Mount Lemmon	Mount Lemmon Survey	NYS	1.2 km	MPC · JPL
505424	2013 RJ_{40}	—	February 10, 2011	Mount Lemmon	Mount Lemmon Survey	NYS	1.1 km	MPC · JPL
505425	2013 RU_{41}	—	September 6, 2013	Catalina	CSS	·	980 m	MPC · JPL
505426	2013 RF_{46}	—	January 24, 2007	Mount Lemmon	Mount Lemmon Survey	·	1.1 km	MPC · JPL
505427	2013 RY_{47}	—	September 17, 2009	Kitt Peak	Spacewatch	·	900 m	MPC · JPL
505428	2013 RV_{61}	—	December 27, 2006	Mount Lemmon	Mount Lemmon Survey	·	970 m	MPC · JPL
505429	2013 RM_{64}	—	September 2, 1998	Kitt Peak	Spacewatch	NYS	880 m	MPC · JPL
505430	2013 RR_{70}	—	August 27, 2013	Haleakala	Pan-STARRS 1	·	1.4 km	MPC · JPL
505431	2013 RV_{75}	—	October 30, 2009	Mount Lemmon	Mount Lemmon Survey	·	800 m	MPC · JPL
505432	2013 RS_{83}	—	September 6, 2013	Kitt Peak	Spacewatch	·	1.0 km	MPC · JPL
505433	2013 RR_{95}	—	March 16, 2012	Haleakala	Pan-STARRS 1	·	1.2 km	MPC · JPL
505434	2013 SF_{15}	—	February 10, 2011	Mount Lemmon	Mount Lemmon Survey	MAS	640 m	MPC · JPL
505435	2013 SV_{15}	—	September 5, 2013	Catalina	CSS	·	1.5 km	MPC · JPL
505436	2013 SL_{28}	—	January 17, 2007	Kitt Peak	Spacewatch	·	1.0 km	MPC · JPL
505437	2013 SO_{28}	—	January 27, 2007	Kitt Peak	Spacewatch	·	1.1 km	MPC · JPL
505438	2013 SF_{29}	—	October 14, 2009	Mount Lemmon	Mount Lemmon Survey	·	1.0 km	MPC · JPL
505439	2013 SW_{41}	—	October 27, 2005	Kitt Peak	Spacewatch	·	810 m	MPC · JPL
505440	2013 SN_{50}	—	October 22, 2009	Mount Lemmon	Mount Lemmon Survey	MAR	940 m	MPC · JPL
505441	2013 SF_{58}	—	October 18, 2009	Mount Lemmon	Mount Lemmon Survey	·	1.5 km	MPC · JPL
505442	2013 SE_{65}	—	February 3, 2009	Catalina	CSS	T_{j} (2.98)	3.4 km	MPC · JPL
505443	2013 ST_{68}	—	January 28, 2011	Catalina	CSS	PHO	1.1 km	MPC · JPL
505444	2013 SY_{76}	—	April 5, 2008	Mount Lemmon	Mount Lemmon Survey	V	650 m	MPC · JPL
505445	2013 SC_{84}	—	January 8, 2011	Mount Lemmon	Mount Lemmon Survey	·	1.0 km	MPC · JPL
505446	2013 SP_{99}	—	September 29, 2013	Mauna Kea	OSSOS	cubewano (cold) · critical	115 km	MPC · JPL
505447	2013 SQ_{99}	—	September 29, 2013	Mauna Kea	OSSOS	cubewano (cold) · moon · critical	170 km	MPC · JPL
505448	2013 SA_{100}	—	September 29, 2013	Mauna Kea	OSSOS	cubewano (hot) · critical	315 km	MPC · JPL
505449	2013 TT_{14}	—	September 21, 2009	Mount Lemmon	Mount Lemmon Survey	·	1.1 km	MPC · JPL
505450	2013 TC_{21}	—	September 1, 2013	Mount Lemmon	Mount Lemmon Survey	·	1.1 km	MPC · JPL
505451	2013 TR_{24}	—	March 5, 2011	Kitt Peak	Spacewatch	HNS	1.2 km	MPC · JPL
505452	2013 TD_{29}	—	February 12, 2008	Mount Lemmon	Mount Lemmon Survey	·	1.3 km	MPC · JPL
505453	2013 TE_{32}	—	June 20, 2013	Haleakala	Pan-STARRS 1	·	900 m	MPC · JPL
505454	2013 TO_{33}	—	September 1, 2013	Mount Lemmon	Mount Lemmon Survey	·	1.2 km	MPC · JPL
505455	2013 TE_{49}	—	September 21, 2009	Kitt Peak	Spacewatch	·	1.1 km	MPC · JPL
505456	2013 TU_{49}	—	August 15, 2009	Kitt Peak	Spacewatch	MAS	720 m	MPC · JPL
505457	2013 TV_{59}	—	February 12, 2011	Mount Lemmon	Mount Lemmon Survey	·	1.2 km	MPC · JPL
505458	2013 TO_{66}	—	August 16, 2009	La Sagra	OAM	PHO	630 m	MPC · JPL
505459	2013 TB_{71}	—	May 30, 2008	Kitt Peak	Spacewatch	·	1.2 km	MPC · JPL
505460	2013 TY_{78}	—	October 6, 2013	Mount Lemmon	Mount Lemmon Survey	·	1.6 km	MPC · JPL
505461	2013 TZ_{80}	—	April 26, 2007	Kitt Peak	Spacewatch	·	1.1 km	MPC · JPL
505462	2013 TV_{90}	—	September 23, 2009	Kitt Peak	Spacewatch	·	690 m	MPC · JPL
505463	2013 TV_{92}	—	August 28, 2009	Kitt Peak	Spacewatch	·	850 m	MPC · JPL
505464	2013 TA_{93}	—	September 13, 2013	Mount Lemmon	Mount Lemmon Survey	·	2.3 km	MPC · JPL
505465	2013 TE_{94}	—	October 1, 2013	Mount Lemmon	Mount Lemmon Survey	(5)	1.2 km	MPC · JPL
505466	2013 TU_{94}	—	December 20, 2009	Mount Lemmon	Mount Lemmon Survey	·	1.4 km	MPC · JPL
505467	2013 TP_{95}	—	March 25, 2007	Mount Lemmon	Mount Lemmon Survey	HNS	830 m	MPC · JPL
505468	2013 TH_{107}	—	October 12, 2005	Kitt Peak	Spacewatch	·	730 m	MPC · JPL
505469	2013 TS_{111}	—	November 3, 2005	Mount Lemmon	Mount Lemmon Survey	·	950 m	MPC · JPL
505470	2013 TM_{112}	—	August 28, 2005	Kitt Peak	Spacewatch	NYS	900 m	MPC · JPL
505471	2013 TP_{129}	—	April 12, 2002	Kitt Peak	Spacewatch	·	1.7 km	MPC · JPL
505472	2013 TQ_{130}	—	September 16, 2013	Mount Lemmon	Mount Lemmon Survey	EUN	1.0 km	MPC · JPL
505473	2013 TH_{132}	—	March 1, 2011	Catalina	CSS	·	1.2 km	MPC · JPL
505474	2013 TB_{135}	—	May 15, 2008	Mount Lemmon	Mount Lemmon Survey	·	1.4 km	MPC · JPL
505475	2013 UG_{7}	—	September 28, 2009	Mount Lemmon	Mount Lemmon Survey	·	790 m	MPC · JPL
505476	2013 UL_{15}	—	October 31, 2013	Mauna Kea	OSSOS	cubewano (cold) · moon	152 km	MPC · JPL
505477	2013 UM_{15}	—	October 31, 2013	Mauna Kea	OSSOS	res · 6:11	146 km	MPC · JPL
505478	2013 UT_{15}	—	October 31, 2013	Mauna Kea	OSSOS	SDO	204 km	MPC · JPL
505479	2013 VS_{1}	—	October 6, 2005	Kitt Peak	Spacewatch	·	930 m	MPC · JPL
505480	2013 VJ_{14}	—	December 17, 2001	Kitt Peak	Spacewatch	·	1.8 km	MPC · JPL
505481	2013 VB_{15}	—	November 25, 2009	Mount Lemmon	Mount Lemmon Survey	EUN	1 km	MPC · JPL
505482	2013 VQ_{18}	—	April 29, 2011	Catalina	CSS	RAF	1.1 km	MPC · JPL
505483	2013 VA_{20}	—	September 16, 2009	Catalina	CSS	·	1.3 km	MPC · JPL
505484	2013 VL_{23}	—	November 25, 2009	Mount Lemmon	Mount Lemmon Survey	·	1.2 km	MPC · JPL
505485	2013 WM_{2}	—	May 22, 2011	Mount Lemmon	Mount Lemmon Survey	HNS	1.3 km	MPC · JPL
505486	2013 WG_{3}	—	November 4, 2013	XuYi	PMO NEO Survey Program	·	990 m	MPC · JPL
505487	2013 WV_{8}	—	November 16, 2009	Kitt Peak	Spacewatch	·	960 m	MPC · JPL
505488	2013 WW_{14}	—	May 21, 2012	Haleakala	Pan-STARRS 1	·	1.1 km	MPC · JPL
505489	2013 WO_{17}	—	April 3, 2011	Haleakala	Pan-STARRS 1	·	1.6 km	MPC · JPL
505490	2013 WD_{37}	—	January 11, 2010	Mount Lemmon	Mount Lemmon Survey	·	1.2 km	MPC · JPL
505491	2013 WH_{37}	—	October 18, 2009	Mount Lemmon	Mount Lemmon Survey	EUN	1.1 km	MPC · JPL
505492	2013 WT_{48}	—	September 25, 2008	Mount Lemmon	Mount Lemmon Survey	·	1.5 km	MPC · JPL
505493	2013 WA_{49}	—	July 13, 2013	Haleakala	Pan-STARRS 1	·	1.3 km	MPC · JPL
505494	2013 WC_{56}	—	November 10, 2013	Kitt Peak	Spacewatch	·	1.3 km	MPC · JPL
505495	2013 WH_{63}	—	December 30, 2000	Socorro	LINEAR	·	1.8 km	MPC · JPL
505496	2013 WM_{64}	—	July 16, 2013	Haleakala	Pan-STARRS 1	·	1.3 km	MPC · JPL
505497	2013 WW_{64}	—	April 21, 2011	Haleakala	Pan-STARRS 1	·	2.8 km	MPC · JPL
505498	2013 WY_{65}	—	November 27, 2013	Haleakala	Pan-STARRS 1	BRA	1.7 km	MPC · JPL
505499	2013 WS_{69}	—	November 10, 2005	Mount Lemmon	Mount Lemmon Survey	·	980 m	MPC · JPL
505500	2013 WE_{74}	—	October 30, 2013	Haleakala	Pan-STARRS 1	·	1.4 km	MPC · JPL

== 505501–505600 ==
back to top

Designation			Discovery			Properties		Ref
Permanent	Provisional	Named after	Date	Site	Discoverer(s)	Category	Diam.	Ref
505501	2013 WV_{74}	—	October 8, 2004	Kitt Peak	Spacewatch	·	1.2 km	MPC · JPL
505502	2013 WW_{76}	—	October 26, 2013	Mount Lemmon	Mount Lemmon Survey	·	1.8 km	MPC · JPL
505503	2013 WC_{85}	—	April 21, 2012	Kitt Peak	Spacewatch	·	1.6 km	MPC · JPL
505504	2013 WA_{87}	—	April 28, 2011	Haleakala	Pan-STARRS 1	HNS	1.3 km	MPC · JPL
505505	2013 WW_{88}	—	December 2, 2005	Mount Lemmon	Mount Lemmon Survey	EUN	990 m	MPC · JPL
505506	2013 WC_{89}	—	August 14, 2004	Campo Imperatore	CINEOS	RAF	800 m	MPC · JPL
505507	2013 WL_{98}	—	September 10, 2004	Kitt Peak	Spacewatch	·	1.2 km	MPC · JPL
505508	2013 WX_{103}	—	December 28, 2005	Kitt Peak	Spacewatch	(5)	960 m	MPC · JPL
505509	2013 WT_{104}	—	November 26, 2009	Mount Lemmon	Mount Lemmon Survey	·	760 m	MPC · JPL
505510	2013 WP_{105}	—	November 29, 2013	Haleakala	Pan-STARRS 1	HNS	1.1 km	MPC · JPL
505511	2013 WS_{108}	—	November 28, 2013	Mount Lemmon	Mount Lemmon Survey	HNS	1.7 km	MPC · JPL
505512	2013 WL_{109}	—	November 22, 2009	Mount Lemmon	Mount Lemmon Survey	·	1.5 km	MPC · JPL
505513	2013 XO_{1}	—	May 21, 2012	Haleakala	Pan-STARRS 1	·	1.6 km	MPC · JPL
505514	2013 XE_{3}	—	November 10, 2013	Mount Lemmon	Mount Lemmon Survey	(5)	1.2 km	MPC · JPL
505515	2013 XC_{25}	—	June 6, 2011	Mount Lemmon	Mount Lemmon Survey	EUN	1.7 km	MPC · JPL
505516	2013 YP_{1}	—	February 15, 2010	Catalina	CSS	·	1.4 km	MPC · JPL
505517	2013 YC_{9}	—	October 28, 2008	Kitt Peak	Spacewatch	·	1.7 km	MPC · JPL
505518	2013 YO_{9}	—	December 24, 2013	Mount Lemmon	Mount Lemmon Survey	·	1.7 km	MPC · JPL
505519	2013 YK_{11}	—	October 23, 2012	Haleakala	Pan-STARRS 1	·	2.5 km	MPC · JPL
505520	2013 YH_{13}	—	April 30, 2011	Kitt Peak	Spacewatch	HNS	1.1 km	MPC · JPL
505521	2013 YZ_{16}	—	January 17, 2005	Kitt Peak	Spacewatch	MRX	1.0 km	MPC · JPL
505522	2013 YK_{18}	—	December 27, 2009	Kitt Peak	Spacewatch	EUN	990 m	MPC · JPL
505523	2013 YW_{23}	—	November 11, 2013	Kitt Peak	Spacewatch	·	1.4 km	MPC · JPL
505524	2013 YU_{24}	—	December 28, 2005	Mount Lemmon	Mount Lemmon Survey	·	1.0 km	MPC · JPL
505525	2013 YW_{24}	—	November 29, 2000	Socorro	LINEAR	·	1.8 km	MPC · JPL
505526	2013 YL_{27}	—	November 30, 2008	Kitt Peak	Spacewatch	·	1.6 km	MPC · JPL
505527	2013 YO_{27}	—	April 8, 2010	Kitt Peak	Spacewatch	·	1.3 km	MPC · JPL
505528	2013 YJ_{32}	—	December 25, 2013	Mount Lemmon	Mount Lemmon Survey	·	3.1 km	MPC · JPL
505529	2013 YP_{39}	—	December 24, 2013	Mount Lemmon	Mount Lemmon Survey	·	1.6 km	MPC · JPL
505530	2013 YU_{41}	—	May 29, 2012	Mount Lemmon	Mount Lemmon Survey	·	1.3 km	MPC · JPL
505531	2013 YQ_{42}	—	January 4, 2006	Catalina	CSS	·	1.5 km	MPC · JPL
505532	2013 YE_{43}	—	October 31, 2008	Catalina	CSS	·	1.6 km	MPC · JPL
505533	2013 YS_{44}	—	December 26, 2013	Kitt Peak	Spacewatch	·	2.0 km	MPC · JPL
505534	2013 YU_{51}	—	November 18, 2003	Kitt Peak	Spacewatch	·	1.7 km	MPC · JPL
505535	2013 YQ_{54}	—	November 28, 2013	Mount Lemmon	Mount Lemmon Survey	EUN	1.2 km	MPC · JPL
505536	2013 YC_{57}	—	April 7, 2006	Kitt Peak	Spacewatch	·	1.2 km	MPC · JPL
505537	2013 YZ_{58}	—	December 15, 2009	Mount Lemmon	Mount Lemmon Survey	·	1.6 km	MPC · JPL
505538	2013 YY_{76}	—	December 9, 1996	Kitt Peak	Spacewatch	·	1.3 km	MPC · JPL
505539	2013 YL_{81}	—	December 21, 2008	Kitt Peak	Spacewatch	·	1.6 km	MPC · JPL
505540	2013 YW_{82}	—	June 22, 2010	WISE	WISE	·	2.2 km	MPC · JPL
505541	2013 YJ_{97}	—	November 8, 2007	Kitt Peak	Spacewatch	·	2.7 km	MPC · JPL
505542	2013 YN_{100}	—	February 17, 2010	Mount Lemmon	Mount Lemmon Survey	(5)	1.4 km	MPC · JPL
505543	2013 YF_{114}	—	December 17, 2007	Mount Lemmon	Mount Lemmon Survey	·	3.1 km	MPC · JPL
505544	2013 YY_{115}	—	January 6, 2000	Kitt Peak	Spacewatch	DOR	2.9 km	MPC · JPL
505545	2013 YH_{116}	—	December 30, 2013	Mount Lemmon	Mount Lemmon Survey	VER	2.9 km	MPC · JPL
505546	2013 YH_{120}	—	November 7, 2008	Mount Lemmon	Mount Lemmon Survey	·	1.7 km	MPC · JPL
505547	2013 YW_{126}	—	April 7, 2010	WISE	WISE	EUP	2.9 km	MPC · JPL
505548	2013 YF_{131}	—	December 31, 2013	Mount Lemmon	Mount Lemmon Survey	·	2.1 km	MPC · JPL
505549	2013 YF_{133}	—	October 4, 2008	La Sagra	OAM	·	1.7 km	MPC · JPL
505550	2013 YS_{139}	—	July 28, 2011	Haleakala	Pan-STARRS 1	·	2.8 km	MPC · JPL
505551	2013 YD_{140}	—	December 29, 2005	Kitt Peak	Spacewatch	·	1.2 km	MPC · JPL
505552	2013 YW_{144}	—	October 11, 2012	Mount Lemmon	Mount Lemmon Survey	·	1.6 km	MPC · JPL
505553	2013 YS_{149}	—	December 25, 2013	Mount Lemmon	Mount Lemmon Survey	·	1.9 km	MPC · JPL
505554	2014 AW_{2}	—	January 23, 2006	Kitt Peak	Spacewatch	·	1.0 km	MPC · JPL
505555	2014 AS_{7}	—	January 19, 2005	Kitt Peak	Spacewatch	·	2.0 km	MPC · JPL
505556	2014 AC_{8}	—	December 16, 2004	Kitt Peak	Spacewatch	NEM	2.1 km	MPC · JPL
505557	2014 AC_{13}	—	October 7, 2013	Mount Lemmon	Mount Lemmon Survey	MAR	1.0 km	MPC · JPL
505558	2014 AY_{14}	—	September 30, 2003	Kitt Peak	Spacewatch	·	1.5 km	MPC · JPL
505559	2014 AD_{36}	—	December 24, 2013	Mount Lemmon	Mount Lemmon Survey	·	2.0 km	MPC · JPL
505560	2014 AV_{36}	—	February 25, 2006	Kitt Peak	Spacewatch	MIS	2.1 km	MPC · JPL
505561	2014 AC_{37}	—	September 23, 2008	Mount Lemmon	Mount Lemmon Survey	·	1.6 km	MPC · JPL
505562	2014 AW_{40}	—	February 2, 2005	Catalina	CSS	·	2.7 km	MPC · JPL
505563	2014 AX_{42}	—	January 7, 2010	Kitt Peak	Spacewatch	·	1.0 km	MPC · JPL
505564	2014 AA_{43}	—	December 26, 2013	Mount Lemmon	Mount Lemmon Survey	(5)	1.3 km	MPC · JPL
505565	2014 AT_{45}	—	April 1, 2005	Catalina	CSS	·	2.0 km	MPC · JPL
505566	2014 AX_{51}	—	February 20, 2006	Kitt Peak	Spacewatch	HNS	1.1 km	MPC · JPL
505567	2014 BC_{1}	—	November 24, 2009	Mount Lemmon	Mount Lemmon Survey	·	2.0 km	MPC · JPL
505568	2014 BY_{4}	—	September 14, 2013	Haleakala	Pan-STARRS 1	·	2.3 km	MPC · JPL
505569	2014 BS_{6}	—	December 18, 2007	Mount Lemmon	Mount Lemmon Survey	VER	2.7 km	MPC · JPL
505570	2014 BY_{10}	—	May 12, 2010	WISE	WISE	·	3.6 km	MPC · JPL
505571	2014 BK_{15}	—	September 19, 2003	Kitt Peak	Spacewatch	·	1.9 km	MPC · JPL
505572	2014 BQ_{15}	—	October 7, 2012	Haleakala	Pan-STARRS 1	·	2.1 km	MPC · JPL
505573	2014 BS_{16}	—	January 1, 2014	Haleakala	Pan-STARRS 1	·	1.4 km	MPC · JPL
505574	2014 BL_{22}	—	July 28, 2011	Haleakala	Pan-STARRS 1	·	2.6 km	MPC · JPL
505575	2014 BB_{24}	—	February 17, 2010	WISE	WISE	·	3.2 km	MPC · JPL
505576	2014 BZ_{31}	—	March 3, 2005	Catalina	CSS	·	1.7 km	MPC · JPL
505577	2014 BX_{38}	—	January 23, 2014	Mount Lemmon	Mount Lemmon Survey	·	2.7 km	MPC · JPL
505578	2014 BA_{39}	—	February 28, 2009	Mount Lemmon	Mount Lemmon Survey	BRA	1.2 km	MPC · JPL
505579	2014 BM_{39}	—	August 14, 2012	Kitt Peak	Spacewatch	·	2.2 km	MPC · JPL
505580	2014 BL_{47}	—	August 6, 2011	Haleakala	Pan-STARRS 1	EOS	2.0 km	MPC · JPL
505581	2014 BR_{47}	—	February 15, 2010	WISE	WISE	·	2.3 km	MPC · JPL
505582	2014 BN_{48}	—	December 18, 2007	Mount Lemmon	Mount Lemmon Survey	EOS	2.1 km	MPC · JPL
505583	2014 BV_{50}	—	January 16, 2010	Mount Lemmon	Mount Lemmon Survey	·	970 m	MPC · JPL
505584	2014 BP_{53}	—	February 6, 2000	Kitt Peak	Spacewatch	·	1.9 km	MPC · JPL
505585	2014 BC_{61}	—	January 12, 2010	WISE	WISE	·	3.1 km	MPC · JPL
505586	2014 BT_{62}	—	March 22, 2009	Mount Lemmon	Mount Lemmon Survey	·	2.6 km	MPC · JPL
505587	2014 BV_{63}	—	December 13, 2013	Mount Lemmon	Mount Lemmon Survey	·	3.3 km	MPC · JPL
505588	2014 CX	—	December 30, 2013	Mount Lemmon	Mount Lemmon Survey	·	2.9 km	MPC · JPL
505589	2014 CZ_{4}	—	April 20, 2010	WISE	WISE	·	3.0 km	MPC · JPL
505590	2014 CA_{5}	—	March 5, 2010	Catalina	CSS	·	1.0 km	MPC · JPL
505591	2014 CL_{5}	—	October 21, 2003	Kitt Peak	Spacewatch	·	1.5 km	MPC · JPL
505592	2014 CE_{11}	—	January 29, 2009	Mount Lemmon	Mount Lemmon Survey	·	2.0 km	MPC · JPL
505593	2014 CR_{15}	—	January 3, 2014	Mount Lemmon	Mount Lemmon Survey	·	2.6 km	MPC · JPL
505594	2014 CH_{22}	—	November 21, 2008	Kitt Peak	Spacewatch	·	2.0 km	MPC · JPL
505595	2014 DS_{8}	—	December 19, 2009	Mount Lemmon	Mount Lemmon Survey	KON	2.3 km	MPC · JPL
505596	2014 DA_{21}	—	October 1, 2003	Kitt Peak	Spacewatch	·	2.1 km	MPC · JPL
505597	2014 DV_{27}	—	February 12, 2004	Kitt Peak	Spacewatch	·	1.7 km	MPC · JPL
505598	2014 DP_{47}	—	November 3, 2007	Kitt Peak	Spacewatch	·	1.6 km	MPC · JPL
505599	2014 DS_{47}	—	September 4, 2011	Haleakala	Pan-STARRS 1	·	3.2 km	MPC · JPL
505600	2014 DE_{48}	—	September 23, 2011	Haleakala	Pan-STARRS 1	·	2.9 km	MPC · JPL

== 505601–505700 ==
back to top

Designation			Discovery			Properties		Ref
Permanent	Provisional	Named after	Date	Site	Discoverer(s)	Category	Diam.	Ref
505601	2014 DC_{50}	—	February 10, 2014	Haleakala	Pan-STARRS 1	·	2.3 km	MPC · JPL
505602	2014 DV_{50}	—	October 21, 2006	Mount Lemmon	Mount Lemmon Survey	EOS	1.5 km	MPC · JPL
505603	2014 DM_{91}	—	January 29, 2014	Mount Lemmon	Mount Lemmon Survey	·	3.0 km	MPC · JPL
505604	2014 DC_{92}	—	December 16, 2007	Mount Lemmon	Mount Lemmon Survey	·	2.2 km	MPC · JPL
505605	2014 DV_{95}	—	December 30, 2007	Mount Lemmon	Mount Lemmon Survey	·	2.0 km	MPC · JPL
505606	2014 DP_{106}	—	November 19, 2007	Mount Lemmon	Mount Lemmon Survey	·	1.5 km	MPC · JPL
505607	2014 DM_{113}	—	October 30, 2007	Kitt Peak	Spacewatch	·	1.7 km	MPC · JPL
505608	2014 DJ_{123}	—	April 19, 2007	Mount Lemmon	Mount Lemmon Survey	3:2	4.6 km	MPC · JPL
505609	2014 DH_{144}	—	October 8, 2012	Haleakala	Pan-STARRS 1	H	490 m	MPC · JPL
505610	2014 EZ_{4}	—	February 28, 2014	Haleakala	Pan-STARRS 1	·	3.0 km	MPC · JPL
505611	2014 EK_{5}	—	February 27, 2014	Mount Lemmon	Mount Lemmon Survey	·	2.8 km	MPC · JPL
505612	2014 EX_{7}	—	August 29, 2006	Kitt Peak	Spacewatch	·	3.0 km	MPC · JPL
505613	2014 EF_{21}	—	August 31, 2011	Haleakala	Pan-STARRS 1	EOS	2.1 km	MPC · JPL
505614	2014 EA_{45}	—	April 2, 2009	Kitt Peak	Spacewatch	EOS	1.6 km	MPC · JPL
505615	2014 EK_{46}	—	February 26, 2014	Mount Lemmon	Mount Lemmon Survey	·	2.2 km	MPC · JPL
505616	2014 EL_{46}	—	February 26, 2014	Mount Lemmon	Mount Lemmon Survey	·	3.0 km	MPC · JPL
505617	2014 ER_{47}	—	September 26, 2011	Haleakala	Pan-STARRS 1	·	3.1 km	MPC · JPL
505618	2014 FE_{18}	—	September 19, 2006	Kitt Peak	Spacewatch	TIR	2.2 km	MPC · JPL
505619	2014 FZ_{19}	—	January 3, 2014	Mount Lemmon	Mount Lemmon Survey	EOS	2.1 km	MPC · JPL
505620	2014 FJ_{39}	—	September 21, 2012	Mount Lemmon	Mount Lemmon Survey	H	480 m	MPC · JPL
505621	2014 FL_{39}	—	December 22, 2012	Haleakala	Pan-STARRS 1	·	2.4 km	MPC · JPL
505622	2014 FA_{51}	—	February 28, 2008	Mount Lemmon	Mount Lemmon Survey	CYB	2.9 km	MPC · JPL
505623	2014 GB_{39}	—	September 26, 2011	Haleakala	Pan-STARRS 1	·	2.5 km	MPC · JPL
505624	2014 GU_{53}	—	April 8, 2014	Haleakala	Pan-STARRS 1	cubewano (hot)	323 km	MPC · JPL
505625	2014 HT_{11}	—	May 26, 2009	Mount Lemmon	Mount Lemmon Survey	EUP	3.2 km	MPC · JPL
505626	2014 HE_{83}	—	November 1, 2006	Kitt Peak	Spacewatch	·	2.7 km	MPC · JPL
505627	2014 HP_{113}	—	January 20, 2008	Mount Lemmon	Mount Lemmon Survey	·	2.0 km	MPC · JPL
505628	2014 HL_{143}	—	March 27, 2003	Kitt Peak	Spacewatch	·	2.3 km	MPC · JPL
505629	2014 HW_{145}	—	November 14, 2006	Mount Lemmon	Mount Lemmon Survey	·	2.5 km	MPC · JPL
505630	2014 HB_{187}	—	April 21, 2014	Kitt Peak	Spacewatch	3:2	5.0 km	MPC · JPL
505631	2014 HA_{188}	—	February 8, 2008	Catalina	CSS	THB	2.7 km	MPC · JPL
505632	2014 JQ_{5}	—	October 25, 2011	Haleakala	Pan-STARRS 1	T_{j} (2.96) · CYB	4.9 km	MPC · JPL
505633	2014 JQ_{56}	—	October 10, 2012	Catalina	CSS	H	350 m	MPC · JPL
505634	2014 KA	—	October 8, 2012	Haleakala	Pan-STARRS 1	H	520 m	MPC · JPL
505635	2014 KG_{102}	—	November 6, 2012	Mount Lemmon	Mount Lemmon Survey	H	320 m	MPC · JPL
505636	2014 LA_{29}	—	August 16, 2009	Catalina	CSS	H	560 m	MPC · JPL
505637	2014 MH_{27}	—	October 4, 2012	Haleakala	Pan-STARRS 1	H	420 m	MPC · JPL
505638	2014 MM_{70}	—	January 22, 2013	Kitt Peak	Spacewatch	H	360 m	MPC · JPL
505639	2014 MO_{70}	—	February 3, 2005	Socorro	LINEAR	H	510 m	MPC · JPL
505640	2014 NB_{37}	—	December 23, 2012	Mount Lemmon	Mount Lemmon Survey	H	550 m	MPC · JPL
505641	2014 OS_{40}	—	June 27, 2014	Haleakala	Pan-STARRS 1	H	400 m	MPC · JPL
505642	2014 OX_{63}	—	July 8, 2014	Haleakala	Pan-STARRS 1	H	420 m	MPC · JPL
505643	2014 OQ_{98}	—	January 9, 2013	Catalina	CSS	H	600 m	MPC · JPL
505644	2014 OF_{152}	—	February 24, 2006	Mount Lemmon	Mount Lemmon Survey	CYB	3.2 km	MPC · JPL
505645	2014 OB_{300}	—	July 27, 2014	Haleakala	Pan-STARRS 1	H	480 m	MPC · JPL
505646	2014 QT_{32}	—	June 26, 2014	Haleakala	Pan-STARRS 1	H	540 m	MPC · JPL
505647	2014 QH_{327}	—	August 25, 2014	Haleakala	Pan-STARRS 1	H	480 m	MPC · JPL
505648	2014 QO_{354}	—	March 7, 2013	Mount Lemmon	Mount Lemmon Survey	H	420 m	MPC · JPL
505649	2014 QL_{443}	—	August 29, 2014	Haleakala	Pan-STARRS 1	H	420 m	MPC · JPL
505650	2014 RW_{11}	—	February 17, 2013	Catalina	CSS	H	450 m	MPC · JPL
505651	2014 RK_{18}	—	August 28, 2014	Haleakala	Pan-STARRS 1	H	450 m	MPC · JPL
505652	2014 RZ_{25}	—	February 16, 2013	Mount Lemmon	Mount Lemmon Survey	·	940 m	MPC · JPL
505653	2014 RY_{41}	—	March 15, 2013	Catalina	CSS	H	630 m	MPC · JPL
505654	2014 RU_{63}	—	February 14, 2013	Haleakala	Pan-STARRS 1	H	490 m	MPC · JPL
505655	2014 SZ_{307}	—	September 24, 2014	Mount Lemmon	Mount Lemmon Survey	·	590 m	MPC · JPL
505656	2014 SG_{337}	—	September 2, 2014	Haleakala	Pan-STARRS 1	·	560 m	MPC · JPL
505657	2014 SR_{339}	—	September 30, 2014	WISE	WISE	APO · PHA	970 m	MPC · JPL
505658	2014 SU_{350}	—	September 19, 2014	Haleakala	Pan-STARRS 1	·	880 m	MPC · JPL
505659	2014 TN_{32}	—	December 29, 2008	Mount Lemmon	Mount Lemmon Survey	·	710 m	MPC · JPL
505660	2014 TN_{33}	—	March 20, 2013	Haleakala	Pan-STARRS 1	·	970 m	MPC · JPL
505661	2014 TU_{35}	—	October 1, 2014	Haleakala	Pan-STARRS 1	H	490 m	MPC · JPL
505662	2014 TL_{44}	—	August 24, 2008	Kitt Peak	Spacewatch	·	3.3 km	MPC · JPL
505663	2014 UR_{5}	—	October 22, 2009	Mount Lemmon	Mount Lemmon Survey	·	2.4 km	MPC · JPL
505664	2014 UU_{7}	—	September 12, 2001	Socorro	LINEAR	·	2.1 km	MPC · JPL
505665	2014 UP_{10}	—	October 8, 2004	Kitt Peak	Spacewatch	·	550 m	MPC · JPL
505666	2014 UL_{32}	—	September 11, 2004	Kitt Peak	Spacewatch	·	450 m	MPC · JPL
505667	2014 UV_{33}	—	August 6, 2014	Haleakala	Pan-STARRS 1	AMO +1km	820 m	MPC · JPL
505668	2014 UY_{41}	—	April 6, 2008	Kitt Peak	Spacewatch	EUN	1.2 km	MPC · JPL
505669	2014 UA_{47}	—	April 7, 2013	Mount Lemmon	Mount Lemmon Survey	·	680 m	MPC · JPL
505670	2014 UZ_{51}	—	February 1, 2009	Kitt Peak	Spacewatch	·	760 m	MPC · JPL
505671	2014 UK_{108}	—	May 27, 2003	Kitt Peak	Spacewatch	H	750 m	MPC · JPL
505672	2014 UC_{126}	—	May 4, 2006	Kitt Peak	Spacewatch	·	860 m	MPC · JPL
505673	2014 UC_{135}	—	December 30, 2005	Kitt Peak	Spacewatch	·	1.0 km	MPC · JPL
505674	2014 UK_{137}	—	September 20, 2001	Socorro	LINEAR	·	1.0 km	MPC · JPL
505675	2014 UD_{163}	—	April 8, 2013	Mount Lemmon	Mount Lemmon Survey	·	630 m	MPC · JPL
505676	2014 UG_{200}	—	August 31, 2014	Haleakala	Pan-STARRS 1	·	650 m	MPC · JPL
505677	2014 UV_{216}	—	November 18, 2006	Mount Lemmon	Mount Lemmon Survey	·	1.9 km	MPC · JPL
505678	2014 VL_{37}	—	June 29, 2005	Kitt Peak	Spacewatch	·	1.8 km	MPC · JPL
505679	2014 WT_{69}	—	November 17, 2014	Haleakala	Pan-STARRS 1	twotino	249 km	MPC · JPL
505680	2014 WE_{123}	—	January 13, 2005	Catalina	CSS	·	880 m	MPC · JPL
505681	2014 WT_{125}	—	November 4, 2014	Mount Lemmon	Mount Lemmon Survey	·	650 m	MPC · JPL
505682	2014 WJ_{138}	—	October 17, 2010	Mount Lemmon	Mount Lemmon Survey	NYS	1.0 km	MPC · JPL
505683	2014 WL_{239}	—	January 2, 2009	Mount Lemmon	Mount Lemmon Survey	·	550 m	MPC · JPL
505684	2014 WP_{279}	—	January 2, 2012	Kitt Peak	Spacewatch	·	470 m	MPC · JPL
505685	2014 WC_{299}	—	December 17, 2004	Socorro	LINEAR	·	760 m	MPC · JPL
505686	2014 WF_{360}	—	March 16, 2009	Kitt Peak	Spacewatch	·	480 m	MPC · JPL
505687	2014 WP_{427}	—	November 26, 2014	Haleakala	Pan-STARRS 1	·	1.1 km	MPC · JPL
505688	2014 WR_{428}	—	November 4, 2005	Mount Lemmon	Mount Lemmon Survey	·	1.6 km	MPC · JPL
505689	2014 WH_{469}	—	April 15, 2007	Mount Lemmon	Mount Lemmon Survey	EUN	1.5 km	MPC · JPL
505690	2014 WG_{478}	—	November 21, 2005	Anderson Mesa	LONEOS	MAR	1.2 km	MPC · JPL
505691	2014 WV_{479}	—	October 22, 2003	Kitt Peak	Spacewatch	·	740 m	MPC · JPL
505692	2014 WK_{484}	—	January 27, 2012	Mount Lemmon	Mount Lemmon Survey	·	420 m	MPC · JPL
505693	2014 WA_{485}	—	January 25, 2012	Haleakala	Pan-STARRS 1	·	610 m	MPC · JPL
505694	2014 WB_{492}	—	February 9, 2005	Kitt Peak	Spacewatch	·	1.0 km	MPC · JPL
505695	2014 WS_{498}	—	June 18, 2005	Mount Lemmon	Mount Lemmon Survey	·	1.6 km	MPC · JPL
505696	2014 YD_{5}	—	December 4, 2007	Mount Lemmon	Mount Lemmon Survey	·	720 m	MPC · JPL
505697	2014 YE_{5}	—	October 24, 2008	Catalina	CSS	·	4.8 km	MPC · JPL
505698	2014 YO_{19}	—	March 23, 2006	Kitt Peak	Spacewatch	·	720 m	MPC · JPL
505699	2014 YS_{32}	—	December 14, 2004	Socorro	LINEAR	·	700 m	MPC · JPL
505700	2014 YD_{41}	—	November 21, 2014	Haleakala	Pan-STARRS 1	(18466)	2.6 km	MPC · JPL

== 505701–505800 ==
back to top

Designation			Discovery			Properties		Ref
Permanent	Provisional	Named after	Date	Site	Discoverer(s)	Category	Diam.	Ref
505701	2014 YF_{41}	—	September 14, 1998	Kitt Peak	Spacewatch	·	1.5 km	MPC · JPL
505702	2015 AX_{11}	—	March 3, 2000	Kitt Peak	Spacewatch	PHO	1.0 km	MPC · JPL
505703	2015 AU_{28}	—	October 8, 2007	Kitt Peak	Spacewatch	·	430 m	MPC · JPL
505704	2015 AK_{54}	—	May 19, 2012	Mount Lemmon	Mount Lemmon Survey	·	2.1 km	MPC · JPL
505705	2015 AF_{76}	—	February 5, 2011	Kitt Peak	Spacewatch	·	1.6 km	MPC · JPL
505706	2015 AA_{89}	—	October 2, 2010	Mount Lemmon	Mount Lemmon Survey	(2076)	760 m	MPC · JPL
505707	2015 AU_{111}	—	September 16, 2003	Kitt Peak	Spacewatch	·	580 m	MPC · JPL
505708	2015 AU_{114}	—	January 13, 2008	Kitt Peak	Spacewatch	V	540 m	MPC · JPL
505709	2015 AB_{120}	—	December 8, 2010	Mount Lemmon	Mount Lemmon Survey	·	1.5 km	MPC · JPL
505710	2015 AJ_{121}	—	February 7, 2008	Mount Lemmon	Mount Lemmon Survey	V	510 m	MPC · JPL
505711	2015 AM_{129}	—	April 1, 2005	Kitt Peak	Spacewatch	·	690 m	MPC · JPL
505712	2015 AO_{132}	—	December 6, 2011	Haleakala	Pan-STARRS 1	·	710 m	MPC · JPL
505713	2015 AA_{137}	—	November 8, 2007	Catalina	CSS	·	670 m	MPC · JPL
505714	2015 AB_{149}	—	November 7, 2007	Kitt Peak	Spacewatch	·	450 m	MPC · JPL
505715	2015 AA_{150}	—	September 3, 2013	Kitt Peak	Spacewatch	·	1.4 km	MPC · JPL
505716	2015 AU_{153}	—	February 28, 2012	Haleakala	Pan-STARRS 1	·	370 m	MPC · JPL
505717	2015 AP_{168}	—	February 22, 2004	Kitt Peak	Spacewatch	MAS	640 m	MPC · JPL
505718	2015 AC_{178}	—	February 13, 2008	Kitt Peak	Spacewatch	·	1.5 km	MPC · JPL
505719	2015 AP_{187}	—	December 4, 2007	Catalina	CSS	·	630 m	MPC · JPL
505720	2015 AF_{232}	—	August 10, 2012	Kitt Peak	Spacewatch	EOS	1.9 km	MPC · JPL
505721	2015 AP_{234}	—	June 24, 2007	Kitt Peak	Spacewatch	·	2.1 km	MPC · JPL
505722	2015 AZ_{237}	—	November 30, 2005	Kitt Peak	Spacewatch	·	1.6 km	MPC · JPL
505723	2015 AO_{244}	—	October 26, 2013	Kitt Peak	Spacewatch	·	1.6 km	MPC · JPL
505724	2015 AQ_{244}	—	September 14, 2013	Haleakala	Pan-STARRS 1	EUN	850 m	MPC · JPL
505725	2015 AQ_{254}	—	July 13, 2013	Haleakala	Pan-STARRS 1	·	550 m	MPC · JPL
505726	2015 AN_{256}	—	December 26, 2006	Kitt Peak	Spacewatch	·	850 m	MPC · JPL
505727	2015 AY_{257}	—	September 11, 2007	Mount Lemmon	Mount Lemmon Survey	·	520 m	MPC · JPL
505728	2015 AN_{266}	—	October 10, 2007	Catalina	CSS	·	720 m	MPC · JPL
505729	2015 BV_{2}	—	November 28, 2010	Mount Lemmon	Mount Lemmon Survey	V	480 m	MPC · JPL
505730	2015 BX_{2}	—	March 30, 2008	Kitt Peak	Spacewatch	·	1.6 km	MPC · JPL
505731	2015 BZ_{4}	—	March 23, 2003	Palomar	NEAT	·	1.6 km	MPC · JPL
505732	2015 BD_{5}	—	April 15, 2008	Mount Lemmon	Mount Lemmon Survey	·	1.2 km	MPC · JPL
505733	2015 BX_{8}	—	April 27, 2012	Kitt Peak	Spacewatch	·	970 m	MPC · JPL
505734	2015 BP_{16}	—	March 8, 2008	Kitt Peak	Spacewatch	V	640 m	MPC · JPL
505735	2015 BX_{19}	—	October 28, 2010	Mount Lemmon	Mount Lemmon Survey	·	1.1 km	MPC · JPL
505736	2015 BB_{28}	—	October 21, 2006	Mount Lemmon	Mount Lemmon Survey	·	1.1 km	MPC · JPL
505737	2015 BX_{31}	—	August 21, 2004	Siding Spring	SSS	·	2.1 km	MPC · JPL
505738	2015 BM_{33}	—	October 29, 2005	Kitt Peak	Spacewatch	·	960 m	MPC · JPL
505739	2015 BQ_{38}	—	December 3, 2004	Kitt Peak	Spacewatch	·	2.3 km	MPC · JPL
505740	2015 BK_{40}	—	July 29, 2008	Kitt Peak	Spacewatch	·	2.3 km	MPC · JPL
505741	2015 BU_{55}	—	January 11, 2011	Mount Lemmon	Mount Lemmon Survey	·	1.7 km	MPC · JPL
505742	2015 BW_{58}	—	January 23, 2011	Mount Lemmon	Mount Lemmon Survey	·	1.2 km	MPC · JPL
505743	2015 BO_{60}	—	March 15, 2004	Kitt Peak	Spacewatch	MAS	640 m	MPC · JPL
505744	2015 BX_{62}	—	February 17, 2004	Kitt Peak	Spacewatch	·	1.3 km	MPC · JPL
505745	2015 BJ_{71}	—	November 5, 2010	Kitt Peak	Spacewatch	·	1.3 km	MPC · JPL
505746	2015 BD_{72}	—	April 27, 2012	Haleakala	Pan-STARRS 1	·	890 m	MPC · JPL
505747	2015 BU_{86}	—	February 4, 2005	Kitt Peak	Spacewatch	·	1.9 km	MPC · JPL
505748	2015 BG_{88}	—	November 16, 2006	Kitt Peak	Spacewatch	·	980 m	MPC · JPL
505749	2015 BD_{89}	—	April 5, 2011	Mount Lemmon	Mount Lemmon Survey	·	1.5 km	MPC · JPL
505750	2015 BM_{90}	—	January 6, 2006	Mount Lemmon	Mount Lemmon Survey	·	2.0 km	MPC · JPL
505751	2015 BX_{98}	—	January 27, 2004	Kitt Peak	Spacewatch	·	1.1 km	MPC · JPL
505752	2015 BH_{99}	—	January 11, 2008	Kitt Peak	Spacewatch	V	520 m	MPC · JPL
505753	2015 BE_{103}	—	January 12, 2011	Kitt Peak	Spacewatch	·	960 m	MPC · JPL
505754	2015 BM_{104}	—	November 28, 2006	Mount Lemmon	Mount Lemmon Survey	MAR	1.2 km	MPC · JPL
505755	2015 BB_{110}	—	October 2, 2006	Mount Lemmon	Mount Lemmon Survey	·	1.2 km	MPC · JPL
505756	2015 BM_{121}	—	February 10, 2011	Mount Lemmon	Mount Lemmon Survey	·	1.2 km	MPC · JPL
505757	2015 BJ_{126}	—	August 28, 2009	La Sagra	OAM	·	1.2 km	MPC · JPL
505758	2015 BP_{127}	—	December 30, 2005	Kitt Peak	Spacewatch	·	1.6 km	MPC · JPL
505759	2015 BG_{128}	—	January 13, 2008	Kitt Peak	Spacewatch	·	1.1 km	MPC · JPL
505760	2015 BH_{128}	—	April 22, 1998	Kitt Peak	Spacewatch	·	1.3 km	MPC · JPL
505761	2015 BR_{141}	—	September 1, 2013	Catalina	CSS	V	620 m	MPC · JPL
505762	2015 BF_{167}	—	January 30, 2011	Kitt Peak	Spacewatch	·	1.3 km	MPC · JPL
505763	2015 BH_{172}	—	November 16, 2006	Kitt Peak	Spacewatch	·	1.3 km	MPC · JPL
505764	2015 BZ_{186}	—	November 30, 2003	Kitt Peak	Spacewatch	·	640 m	MPC · JPL
505765	2015 BV_{189}	—	June 16, 2012	Haleakala	Pan-STARRS 1	·	2.1 km	MPC · JPL
505766	2015 BK_{206}	—	January 17, 2005	Kitt Peak	Spacewatch	·	670 m	MPC · JPL
505767	2015 BC_{227}	—	July 29, 2008	Mount Lemmon	Mount Lemmon Survey	·	2.0 km	MPC · JPL
505768	2015 BL_{229}	—	March 3, 2008	XuYi	PMO NEO Survey Program	NYS	1.3 km	MPC · JPL
505769	2015 BG_{238}	—	December 15, 2007	Kitt Peak	Spacewatch	·	630 m	MPC · JPL
505770	2015 BN_{252}	—	February 2, 2006	Kitt Peak	Spacewatch	·	2.5 km	MPC · JPL
505771	2015 BH_{254}	—	October 19, 2007	Catalina	CSS	·	460 m	MPC · JPL
505772	2015 BP_{254}	—	June 16, 2012	Haleakala	Pan-STARRS 1	MAR	1.1 km	MPC · JPL
505773	2015 BN_{260}	—	November 14, 2013	Mount Lemmon	Mount Lemmon Survey	·	3.2 km	MPC · JPL
505774	2015 BL_{264}	—	January 18, 2015	Haleakala	Pan-STARRS 1	·	1.3 km	MPC · JPL
505775	2015 BJ_{266}	—	December 10, 2010	Kitt Peak	Spacewatch	MAS	780 m	MPC · JPL
505776	2015 BF_{267}	—	January 27, 2004	Kitt Peak	Spacewatch	·	840 m	MPC · JPL
505777	2015 BE_{268}	—	March 8, 2010	WISE	WISE	·	4.0 km	MPC · JPL
505778	2015 BZ_{268}	—	February 1, 2008	Kitt Peak	Spacewatch	V	720 m	MPC · JPL
505779	2015 BM_{270}	—	November 22, 2006	Kitt Peak	Spacewatch	·	1.0 km	MPC · JPL
505780	2015 BR_{271}	—	December 29, 2014	Mount Lemmon	Mount Lemmon Survey	·	3.0 km	MPC · JPL
505781	2015 BW_{278}	—	March 9, 2007	Mount Lemmon	Mount Lemmon Survey	·	880 m	MPC · JPL
505782	2015 BP_{285}	—	March 14, 2011	Mount Lemmon	Mount Lemmon Survey	RAF	980 m	MPC · JPL
505783	2015 BZ_{286}	—	June 10, 2012	Haleakala	Pan-STARRS 1	EUN	1.7 km	MPC · JPL
505784	2015 BO_{292}	—	January 19, 2015	Kitt Peak	Spacewatch	·	1.1 km	MPC · JPL
505785	2015 BH_{294}	—	April 21, 2011	Haleakala	Pan-STARRS 1	EUN	1.0 km	MPC · JPL
505786	2015 BB_{295}	—	September 2, 2013	Mount Lemmon	Mount Lemmon Survey	·	1.2 km	MPC · JPL
505787	2015 BS_{296}	—	November 11, 2004	Kitt Peak	Spacewatch	EUN	1.4 km	MPC · JPL
505788	2015 BD_{297}	—	January 30, 2011	Kitt Peak	Spacewatch	·	1.6 km	MPC · JPL
505789	2015 BG_{299}	—	March 6, 2011	Kitt Peak	Spacewatch	·	1.1 km	MPC · JPL
505790	2015 BP_{301}	—	October 16, 2006	Catalina	CSS	ERI	1.4 km	MPC · JPL
505791	2015 BC_{302}	—	April 14, 2007	Kitt Peak	Spacewatch	RAF	860 m	MPC · JPL
505792	2015 BJ_{303}	—	November 18, 2003	Kitt Peak	Spacewatch	·	2.1 km	MPC · JPL
505793	2015 BZ_{303}	—	April 5, 2003	Kitt Peak	Spacewatch	·	1 km	MPC · JPL
505794	2015 BK_{305}	—	November 23, 2009	Mount Lemmon	Mount Lemmon Survey	·	1.2 km	MPC · JPL
505795	2015 BP_{305}	—	December 6, 2010	Mount Lemmon	Mount Lemmon Survey	·	1.0 km	MPC · JPL
505796	2015 BX_{315}	—	September 4, 2010	Mount Lemmon	Mount Lemmon Survey	·	890 m	MPC · JPL
505797	2015 BQ_{331}	—	February 13, 2011	Mount Lemmon	Mount Lemmon Survey	·	1.1 km	MPC · JPL
505798	2015 BH_{332}	—	January 15, 2004	Kitt Peak	Spacewatch	V	620 m	MPC · JPL
505799	2015 BO_{342}	—	January 10, 2011	Mount Lemmon	Mount Lemmon Survey	·	960 m	MPC · JPL
505800	2015 BH_{353}	—	December 21, 2014	Mount Lemmon	Mount Lemmon Survey	·	1.7 km	MPC · JPL

== 505801–505900 ==
back to top

Designation			Discovery			Properties		Ref
Permanent	Provisional	Named after	Date	Site	Discoverer(s)	Category	Diam.	Ref
505801	2015 BT_{355}	—	October 24, 2007	Mount Lemmon	Mount Lemmon Survey	·	580 m	MPC · JPL
505802	2015 BQ_{357}	—	March 30, 2012	Mount Lemmon	Mount Lemmon Survey	·	1.2 km	MPC · JPL
505803	2015 BG_{367}	—	January 20, 2008	Kitt Peak	Spacewatch	V	590 m	MPC · JPL
505804	2015 BJ_{378}	—	November 19, 2003	Kitt Peak	Spacewatch	·	950 m	MPC · JPL
505805	2015 BT_{397}	—	December 24, 2005	Kitt Peak	Spacewatch	·	1.5 km	MPC · JPL
505806	2015 BF_{400}	—	April 24, 2012	Haleakala	Pan-STARRS 1	·	1.2 km	MPC · JPL
505807	2015 BM_{402}	—	November 10, 2006	Kitt Peak	Spacewatch	·	1.1 km	MPC · JPL
505808	2015 BP_{405}	—	March 6, 2011	Mount Lemmon	Mount Lemmon Survey	·	1.0 km	MPC · JPL
505809	2015 BS_{405}	—	December 2, 2005	Kitt Peak	Spacewatch	·	1.4 km	MPC · JPL
505810	2015 BJ_{411}	—	March 26, 2007	Kitt Peak	Spacewatch	·	1.4 km	MPC · JPL
505811	2015 BV_{416}	—	September 2, 2000	Socorro	LINEAR	·	1.8 km	MPC · JPL
505812	2015 BG_{425}	—	June 8, 2010	WISE	WISE	ARM	3.6 km	MPC · JPL
505813	2015 BT_{426}	—	November 26, 2005	Mount Lemmon	Mount Lemmon Survey	·	880 m	MPC · JPL
505814	2015 BR_{427}	—	November 30, 2005	Kitt Peak	Spacewatch	·	1.5 km	MPC · JPL
505815	2015 BX_{429}	—	October 6, 2013	Catalina	CSS	·	1.6 km	MPC · JPL
505816	2015 BP_{432}	—	September 6, 2013	Kitt Peak	Spacewatch	ADE	1.3 km	MPC · JPL
505817	2015 BU_{436}	—	January 9, 2011	Mount Lemmon	Mount Lemmon Survey	MAS	500 m	MPC · JPL
505818	2015 BL_{442}	—	September 2, 2008	Kitt Peak	Spacewatch	·	1.5 km	MPC · JPL
505819	2015 BL_{443}	—	February 13, 2011	Mount Lemmon	Mount Lemmon Survey	·	850 m	MPC · JPL
505820	2015 BZ_{447}	—	March 5, 2002	Kitt Peak	Spacewatch	·	1.9 km	MPC · JPL
505821	2015 BQ_{449}	—	September 27, 2009	Mount Lemmon	Mount Lemmon Survey	·	1.1 km	MPC · JPL
505822	2015 BG_{451}	—	February 9, 2005	Mount Lemmon	Mount Lemmon Survey	·	720 m	MPC · JPL
505823	2015 BK_{454}	—	February 17, 2010	Mount Lemmon	Mount Lemmon Survey	·	2.3 km	MPC · JPL
505824	2015 BK_{455}	—	January 25, 2009	Kitt Peak	Spacewatch	·	3.0 km	MPC · JPL
505825	2015 BF_{457}	—	January 20, 2015	Haleakala	Pan-STARRS 1	·	1.3 km	MPC · JPL
505826	2015 BN_{463}	—	February 23, 2007	Mount Lemmon	Mount Lemmon Survey	MAR	1 km	MPC · JPL
505827	2015 BE_{464}	—	November 30, 2005	Mount Lemmon	Mount Lemmon Survey	HNS	1.4 km	MPC · JPL
505828	2015 BP_{483}	—	July 2, 2013	Haleakala	Pan-STARRS 1	·	840 m	MPC · JPL
505829	2015 BJ_{490}	—	July 30, 2008	Mount Lemmon	Mount Lemmon Survey	·	1.7 km	MPC · JPL
505830	2015 BL_{496}	—	August 24, 2000	Socorro	LINEAR	·	1.3 km	MPC · JPL
505831	2015 CA	—	February 2, 2015	Haleakala	Pan-STARRS 1	·	820 m	MPC · JPL
505832	2015 CT_{2}	—	February 28, 2008	Kitt Peak	Spacewatch	·	1.1 km	MPC · JPL
505833	2015 CD_{4}	—	February 25, 2007	Mount Lemmon	Mount Lemmon Survey	·	1.2 km	MPC · JPL
505834	2015 CN_{4}	—	January 18, 2008	Mount Lemmon	Mount Lemmon Survey	·	710 m	MPC · JPL
505835	2015 CU_{4}	—	February 14, 2008	Mount Lemmon	Mount Lemmon Survey	·	960 m	MPC · JPL
505836	2015 CO_{5}	—	October 29, 2005	Catalina	CSS	·	1.3 km	MPC · JPL
505837	2015 CE_{11}	—	October 1, 2003	Kitt Peak	Spacewatch	GEF	1.4 km	MPC · JPL
505838	2015 CL_{15}	—	April 1, 2008	Kitt Peak	Spacewatch	MAS	730 m	MPC · JPL
505839	2015 CA_{20}	—	September 13, 2009	La Sagra	OAM	V	820 m	MPC · JPL
505840	2015 CR_{24}	—	January 13, 2011	Mount Lemmon	Mount Lemmon Survey	·	970 m	MPC · JPL
505841	2015 CO_{25}	—	April 6, 1994	Kitt Peak	Spacewatch	·	1.3 km	MPC · JPL
505842	2015 CQ_{31}	—	October 3, 2006	Mount Lemmon	Mount Lemmon Survey	·	1.1 km	MPC · JPL
505843	2015 CA_{33}	—	November 30, 2005	Kitt Peak	Spacewatch	·	1.2 km	MPC · JPL
505844	2015 CS_{39}	—	April 6, 2011	Mount Lemmon	Mount Lemmon Survey	·	1.5 km	MPC · JPL
505845	2015 CN_{40}	—	September 25, 2009	Kitt Peak	Spacewatch	·	1.3 km	MPC · JPL
505846	2015 CA_{42}	—	January 8, 2010	Kitt Peak	Spacewatch	·	2.3 km	MPC · JPL
505847	2015 CR_{43}	—	February 25, 2006	Mount Lemmon	Mount Lemmon Survey	·	1.8 km	MPC · JPL
505848	2015 CS_{45}	—	February 4, 2009	Catalina	CSS	·	3.0 km	MPC · JPL
505849	2015 CR_{46}	—	February 17, 2004	Kitt Peak	Spacewatch	V	650 m	MPC · JPL
505850	2015 CS_{50}	—	September 27, 2006	Kitt Peak	Spacewatch	NYS	890 m	MPC · JPL
505851	2015 CD_{51}	—	September 3, 2007	Catalina	CSS	·	2.5 km	MPC · JPL
505852	2015 CP_{51}	—	August 24, 2012	Kitt Peak	Spacewatch	·	1.9 km	MPC · JPL
505853	2015 CM_{53}	—	January 3, 2000	Kitt Peak	Spacewatch	KOR	1.7 km	MPC · JPL
505854	2015 CK_{57}	—	March 12, 2005	Kitt Peak	Spacewatch	KOR	1.4 km	MPC · JPL
505855	2015 CL_{59}	—	December 2, 2005	Kitt Peak	L. H. Wasserman, R. L. Millis	·	1.6 km	MPC · JPL
505856	2015 CH_{61}	—	February 7, 2006	Catalina	CSS	EUN	1.4 km	MPC · JPL
505857	2015 DC_{4}	—	August 28, 2006	Kitt Peak	Spacewatch	MAS	680 m	MPC · JPL
505858	2015 DV_{8}	—	June 21, 2012	Kitt Peak	Spacewatch	ADE	1.7 km	MPC · JPL
505859	2015 DQ_{33}	—	April 20, 2007	Kitt Peak	Spacewatch	·	1.3 km	MPC · JPL
505860	2015 DB_{34}	—	February 25, 2006	Kitt Peak	Spacewatch	·	1.6 km	MPC · JPL
505861	2015 DE_{38}	—	November 1, 2013	Mount Lemmon	Mount Lemmon Survey	EUN	1.1 km	MPC · JPL
505862	2015 DT_{41}	—	April 4, 2011	Mount Lemmon	Mount Lemmon Survey	·	1.2 km	MPC · JPL
505863	2015 DU_{64}	—	January 22, 2002	Kitt Peak	Spacewatch	·	1.5 km	MPC · JPL
505864	2015 DJ_{70}	—	November 20, 2009	Kitt Peak	Spacewatch	·	1.1 km	MPC · JPL
505865	2015 DM_{78}	—	February 25, 2007	Kitt Peak	Spacewatch	·	1.1 km	MPC · JPL
505866	2015 DH_{79}	—	October 8, 2004	Kitt Peak	Spacewatch	·	1.4 km	MPC · JPL
505867	2015 DK_{85}	—	December 22, 2005	Kitt Peak	Spacewatch	·	1.5 km	MPC · JPL
505868	2015 DN_{92}	—	January 24, 2015	Mount Lemmon	Mount Lemmon Survey	·	2.8 km	MPC · JPL
505869	2015 DL_{94}	—	September 15, 2006	Kitt Peak	Spacewatch	·	4.0 km	MPC · JPL
505870	2015 DU_{95}	—	March 14, 2007	Mount Lemmon	Mount Lemmon Survey	·	1.1 km	MPC · JPL
505871	2015 DZ_{95}	—	October 27, 2005	Kitt Peak	Spacewatch	·	790 m	MPC · JPL
505872	2015 DD_{97}	—	August 12, 2012	Siding Spring	SSS	GEF	1.2 km	MPC · JPL
505873	2015 DC_{99}	—	March 3, 2008	XuYi	PMO NEO Survey Program	PHO	1.1 km	MPC · JPL
505874	2015 DU_{101}	—	January 17, 2008	Mount Lemmon	Mount Lemmon Survey	·	620 m	MPC · JPL
505875	2015 DV_{101}	—	May 7, 2005	Kitt Peak	Spacewatch	V	650 m	MPC · JPL
505876	2015 DO_{102}	—	October 16, 2007	Mount Lemmon	Mount Lemmon Survey	·	890 m	MPC · JPL
505877	2015 DT_{106}	—	October 25, 2013	Kitt Peak	Spacewatch	·	1.4 km	MPC · JPL
505878	2015 DR_{119}	—	October 2, 2008	Mount Lemmon	Mount Lemmon Survey	·	1.3 km	MPC · JPL
505879	2015 DW_{119}	—	March 29, 2011	Mount Lemmon	Mount Lemmon Survey	MAR	960 m	MPC · JPL
505880	2015 DR_{120}	—	October 30, 2013	Kitt Peak	Spacewatch	·	1.9 km	MPC · JPL
505881	2015 DY_{132}	—	January 7, 2006	Mount Lemmon	Mount Lemmon Survey	·	1.4 km	MPC · JPL
505882	2015 DC_{133}	—	November 10, 2004	Kitt Peak	Spacewatch	·	2.6 km	MPC · JPL
505883	2015 DR_{134}	—	September 29, 2008	Catalina	CSS	·	2.4 km	MPC · JPL
505884	2015 DU_{134}	—	November 9, 2009	Mount Lemmon	Mount Lemmon Survey	EUN	1.1 km	MPC · JPL
505885	2015 DQ_{142}	—	October 8, 2008	Kitt Peak	Spacewatch	·	2.0 km	MPC · JPL
505886	2015 DY_{142}	—	May 13, 2005	Mount Lemmon	Mount Lemmon Survey	·	1.0 km	MPC · JPL
505887	2015 DL_{145}	—	November 17, 2007	Kitt Peak	Spacewatch	·	510 m	MPC · JPL
505888	2015 DH_{147}	—	March 12, 2008	Kitt Peak	Spacewatch	·	1.2 km	MPC · JPL
505889	2015 DW_{149}	—	October 26, 2009	Mount Lemmon	Mount Lemmon Survey	·	1.7 km	MPC · JPL
505890	2015 DB_{152}	—	March 3, 2005	Catalina	CSS	·	640 m	MPC · JPL
505891	2015 DE_{152}	—	February 18, 2015	Haleakala	Pan-STARRS 1	·	2.2 km	MPC · JPL
505892	2015 DN_{165}	—	February 10, 2011	Mount Lemmon	Mount Lemmon Survey	·	1.2 km	MPC · JPL
505893	2015 DO_{165}	—	February 18, 2010	Kitt Peak	Spacewatch	KOR	1.6 km	MPC · JPL
505894	2015 DZ_{170}	—	September 23, 2000	Socorro	LINEAR	·	1.6 km	MPC · JPL
505895	2015 DE_{172}	—	November 3, 2007	Mount Lemmon	Mount Lemmon Survey	·	3.3 km	MPC · JPL
505896	2015 DO_{197}	—	January 22, 2015	Haleakala	Pan-STARRS 1	·	3.5 km	MPC · JPL
505897	2015 DD_{204}	—	February 12, 2004	Kitt Peak	Spacewatch	·	4.1 km	MPC · JPL
505898	2015 DH_{213}	—	January 28, 2015	Haleakala	Pan-STARRS 1	·	2.3 km	MPC · JPL
505899	2015 DK_{213}	—	July 25, 2011	Haleakala	Pan-STARRS 1	615	1.4 km	MPC · JPL
505900	2015 DT_{213}	—	September 25, 2011	Haleakala	Pan-STARRS 1	·	3.0 km	MPC · JPL

== 505901–506000 ==
back to top

Designation			Discovery			Properties		Ref
Permanent	Provisional	Named after	Date	Site	Discoverer(s)	Category	Diam.	Ref
505901	2015 DP_{219}	—	December 30, 2014	Mount Lemmon	Mount Lemmon Survey	·	1.6 km	MPC · JPL
505902	2015 DW_{220}	—	September 29, 2008	Mount Lemmon	Mount Lemmon Survey	WIT	1.1 km	MPC · JPL
505903	2015 DO_{222}	—	August 27, 2009	Kitt Peak	Spacewatch	·	1.3 km	MPC · JPL
505904	2015 DZ_{222}	—	October 26, 2009	Kitt Peak	Spacewatch	·	1.2 km	MPC · JPL
505905	2015 DJ_{223}	—	December 2, 2004	Kitt Peak	Spacewatch	·	2.1 km	MPC · JPL
505906 Raozihe	2015 DV_{223}	Raozihe	March 30, 2011	XuYi	PMO NEO Survey Program	EUN	1.2 km	MPC · JPL
505907	2015 DC_{224}	—	November 12, 1999	Socorro	LINEAR	V	680 m	MPC · JPL
505908	2015 EH_{4}	—	April 1, 2008	Kitt Peak	Spacewatch	·	1.1 km	MPC · JPL
505909	2015 EZ_{9}	—	July 22, 2010	WISE	WISE	·	4.2 km	MPC · JPL
505910	2015 EC_{10}	—	October 12, 2009	Mount Lemmon	Mount Lemmon Survey	BRG	1.3 km	MPC · JPL
505911	2015 ET_{11}	—	March 27, 2008	Mount Lemmon	Mount Lemmon Survey	·	880 m	MPC · JPL
505912	2015 EJ_{20}	—	September 2, 2008	Kitt Peak	Spacewatch	·	1.6 km	MPC · JPL
505913	2015 EU_{22}	—	February 21, 2007	Mount Lemmon	Mount Lemmon Survey	·	1.2 km	MPC · JPL
505914	2015 EE_{28}	—	October 21, 2006	Catalina	CSS	PHO	1.0 km	MPC · JPL
505915	2015 EO_{28}	—	March 2, 2006	Kitt Peak	Spacewatch	HOF	2.4 km	MPC · JPL
505916	2015 EC_{34}	—	February 13, 2004	Kitt Peak	Spacewatch	THM	2.2 km	MPC · JPL
505917	2015 ET_{36}	—	September 11, 2004	Kitt Peak	Spacewatch	·	2.7 km	MPC · JPL
505918	2015 EK_{38}	—	August 24, 2012	Catalina	CSS	EOS	2.0 km	MPC · JPL
505919	2015 ES_{46}	—	January 7, 2010	Mount Lemmon	Mount Lemmon Survey	·	1.4 km	MPC · JPL
505920	2015 EH_{51}	—	October 29, 1999	Kitt Peak	Spacewatch	(13314)	2.8 km	MPC · JPL
505921	2015 EL_{58}	—	November 22, 2008	Kitt Peak	Spacewatch	TIN	1.6 km	MPC · JPL
505922	2015 EZ_{58}	—	November 6, 2013	Haleakala	Pan-STARRS 1	(194)	1.2 km	MPC · JPL
505923	2015 EL_{60}	—	September 19, 2006	Catalina	CSS	·	4.0 km	MPC · JPL
505924	2015 EX_{61}	—	March 5, 2010	Catalina	CSS	·	2.5 km	MPC · JPL
505925	2015 EP_{63}	—	January 21, 2015	Haleakala	Pan-STARRS 1	EUN	1.3 km	MPC · JPL
505926	2015 EH_{65}	—	October 2, 2006	Mount Lemmon	Mount Lemmon Survey	·	3.4 km	MPC · JPL
505927	2015 ER_{72}	—	January 14, 2011	Kitt Peak	Spacewatch	·	1.1 km	MPC · JPL
505928	2015 FV	—	March 14, 2010	WISE	WISE	T_{j} (2.99)	4.1 km	MPC · JPL
505929	2015 FF_{2}	—	October 8, 2013	Mount Lemmon	Mount Lemmon Survey	·	2.2 km	MPC · JPL
505930	2015 FT_{8}	—	January 23, 2015	Haleakala	Pan-STARRS 1	·	3.3 km	MPC · JPL
505931	2015 FK_{19}	—	May 12, 2010	Kitt Peak	Spacewatch	·	2.3 km	MPC · JPL
505932	2015 FB_{21}	—	June 14, 2007	Kitt Peak	Spacewatch	·	2.0 km	MPC · JPL
505933	2015 FZ_{21}	—	January 17, 2010	Kitt Peak	Spacewatch	·	1.9 km	MPC · JPL
505934	2015 FN_{23}	—	October 15, 2004	Mount Lemmon	Mount Lemmon Survey	·	2.3 km	MPC · JPL
505935	2015 FT_{39}	—	February 11, 2010	WISE	WISE	EOS	2.0 km	MPC · JPL
505936	2015 FT_{47}	—	October 2, 2006	Mount Lemmon	Mount Lemmon Survey	V	630 m	MPC · JPL
505937	2015 FT_{56}	—	September 11, 2004	Socorro	LINEAR	·	1.8 km	MPC · JPL
505938	2015 FV_{59}	—	January 24, 2015	Haleakala	Pan-STARRS 1	·	2.0 km	MPC · JPL
505939	2015 FC_{61}	—	December 8, 2005	Kitt Peak	Spacewatch	·	1.5 km	MPC · JPL
505940	2015 FW_{65}	—	October 30, 2008	Mount Lemmon	Mount Lemmon Survey	·	2.1 km	MPC · JPL
505941	2015 FA_{68}	—	January 14, 2008	Kitt Peak	Spacewatch	·	3.5 km	MPC · JPL
505942	2015 FC_{72}	—	March 24, 2006	Kitt Peak	Spacewatch	·	1.9 km	MPC · JPL
505943	2015 FY_{75}	—	April 22, 2004	Kitt Peak	Spacewatch	·	2.6 km	MPC · JPL
505944	2015 FH_{77}	—	April 5, 2011	Kitt Peak	Spacewatch	·	1.2 km	MPC · JPL
505945	2015 FA_{78}	—	December 6, 2012	Mount Lemmon	Mount Lemmon Survey	·	2.3 km	MPC · JPL
505946	2015 FV_{111}	—	March 2, 2011	Mount Lemmon	Mount Lemmon Survey	·	1.2 km	MPC · JPL
505947	2015 FG_{123}	—	January 30, 2004	Kitt Peak	Spacewatch	·	2.2 km	MPC · JPL
505948	2015 FK_{142}	—	November 17, 2006	Kitt Peak	Spacewatch	NYS	1.0 km	MPC · JPL
505949	2015 FM_{148}	—	March 21, 2015	Haleakala	Pan-STARRS 1	·	1.8 km	MPC · JPL
505950	2015 FY_{156}	—	August 8, 2012	Haleakala	Pan-STARRS 1	·	1.6 km	MPC · JPL
505951	2015 FK_{174}	—	April 1, 2011	Kitt Peak	Spacewatch	·	1.1 km	MPC · JPL
505952	2015 FF_{175}	—	March 1, 2009	Kitt Peak	Spacewatch	·	2.5 km	MPC · JPL
505953	2015 FL_{178}	—	February 23, 2010	WISE	WISE	·	3.9 km	MPC · JPL
505954	2015 FB_{207}	—	November 22, 2006	Mount Lemmon	Mount Lemmon Survey	MAS	960 m	MPC · JPL
505955	2015 FN_{213}	—	January 25, 2015	Haleakala	Pan-STARRS 1	BRA	1.3 km	MPC · JPL
505956	2015 FW_{213}	—	July 8, 2010	WISE	WISE	·	2.0 km	MPC · JPL
505957	2015 FB_{214}	—	February 16, 2015	Haleakala	Pan-STARRS 1	LIX	3.3 km	MPC · JPL
505958	2015 FH_{235}	—	March 1, 2011	Mount Lemmon	Mount Lemmon Survey	(5)	1.2 km	MPC · JPL
505959	2015 FB_{238}	—	November 26, 2009	Mount Lemmon	Mount Lemmon Survey	·	1.9 km	MPC · JPL
505960	2015 FO_{285}	—	April 25, 2006	Kitt Peak	Spacewatch	AEO	960 m	MPC · JPL
505961	2015 FO_{286}	—	October 20, 2012	Haleakala	Pan-STARRS 1	·	1.8 km	MPC · JPL
505962	2015 FA_{287}	—	February 24, 2006	Kitt Peak	Spacewatch	·	2.1 km	MPC · JPL
505963	2015 FM_{287}	—	May 3, 2008	Mount Lemmon	Mount Lemmon Survey	·	1.2 km	MPC · JPL
505964	2015 FU_{289}	—	January 31, 2008	Catalina	CSS	·	3.7 km	MPC · JPL
505965	2015 FF_{291}	—	October 8, 2012	Haleakala	Pan-STARRS 1	·	2.2 km	MPC · JPL
505966	2015 FE_{292}	—	March 26, 2011	Mount Lemmon	Mount Lemmon Survey	·	1.1 km	MPC · JPL
505967	2015 FD_{299}	—	December 9, 2012	Haleakala	Pan-STARRS 1	·	2.3 km	MPC · JPL
505968	2015 FA_{301}	—	November 28, 2013	Kitt Peak	Spacewatch	·	2.1 km	MPC · JPL
505969	2015 FL_{304}	—	March 28, 2015	Haleakala	Pan-STARRS 1	·	2.4 km	MPC · JPL
505970	2015 FS_{311}	—	April 17, 1998	Kitt Peak	Spacewatch	·	1.2 km	MPC · JPL
505971	2015 FK_{320}	—	September 24, 2008	Mount Lemmon	Mount Lemmon Survey	·	1.9 km	MPC · JPL
505972	2015 FA_{321}	—	October 20, 2012	Haleakala	Pan-STARRS 1	615	1.5 km	MPC · JPL
505973	2015 FG_{326}	—	October 31, 2013	Mount Lemmon	Mount Lemmon Survey	·	1.7 km	MPC · JPL
505974	2015 FM_{328}	—	November 27, 2009	Mount Lemmon	Mount Lemmon Survey	·	2.6 km	MPC · JPL
505975	2015 FO_{329}	—	November 12, 2012	Mount Lemmon	Mount Lemmon Survey	URS	3.2 km	MPC · JPL
505976	2015 FG_{335}	—	March 27, 2010	WISE	WISE	·	2.4 km	MPC · JPL
505977	2015 FY_{344}	—	February 11, 2004	Socorro	LINEAR	·	1.2 km	MPC · JPL
505978	2015 FF_{368}	—	June 1, 2010	WISE	WISE	EOS	3.6 km	MPC · JPL
505979	2015 GK_{2}	—	April 28, 2011	Haleakala	Pan-STARRS 1	·	1.8 km	MPC · JPL
505980	2015 GB_{23}	—	November 12, 2012	Haleakala	Pan-STARRS 1	·	2.9 km	MPC · JPL
505981	2015 GE_{24}	—	January 24, 2014	Haleakala	Pan-STARRS 1	·	2.1 km	MPC · JPL
505982	2015 GX_{27}	—	May 13, 2010	Mount Lemmon	Mount Lemmon Survey	·	2.8 km	MPC · JPL
505983	2015 GA_{28}	—	September 20, 2008	Kitt Peak	Spacewatch	·	1.9 km	MPC · JPL
505984	2015 GX_{28}	—	March 8, 2005	Mount Lemmon	Mount Lemmon Survey	·	2.1 km	MPC · JPL
505985	2015 GJ_{29}	—	September 3, 2008	Kitt Peak	Spacewatch	·	1.6 km	MPC · JPL
505986	2015 GT_{30}	—	October 28, 2008	Kitt Peak	Spacewatch	AGN	1.2 km	MPC · JPL
505987	2015 GM_{32}	—	October 6, 2012	Haleakala	Pan-STARRS 1	·	2.9 km	MPC · JPL
505988	2015 GO_{33}	—	February 26, 2009	Kitt Peak	Spacewatch	·	3.0 km	MPC · JPL
505989	2015 GN_{34}	—	October 16, 2012	Mount Lemmon	Mount Lemmon Survey	·	2.7 km	MPC · JPL
505990	2015 GO_{35}	—	October 17, 2012	Haleakala	Pan-STARRS 1	KOR	1.1 km	MPC · JPL
505991	2015 GU_{35}	—	March 17, 2004	Kitt Peak	Spacewatch	EOS	1.4 km	MPC · JPL
505992	2015 GV_{37}	—	November 25, 2005	Mount Lemmon	Mount Lemmon Survey	·	920 m	MPC · JPL
505993	2015 GZ_{38}	—	March 9, 2011	Kitt Peak	Spacewatch	·	1.3 km	MPC · JPL
505994	2015 GN_{41}	—	January 18, 2009	Kitt Peak	Spacewatch	EOS	1.9 km	MPC · JPL
505995	2015 GY_{41}	—	October 20, 2012	Haleakala	Pan-STARRS 1	·	3.9 km	MPC · JPL
505996	2015 GN_{42}	—	February 13, 2009	Kitt Peak	Spacewatch	EOS	1.7 km	MPC · JPL
505997	2015 GO_{43}	—	March 21, 2015	Haleakala	Pan-STARRS 1	·	2.2 km	MPC · JPL
505998	2015 GR_{43}	—	March 21, 2015	Haleakala	Pan-STARRS 1	·	2.5 km	MPC · JPL
505999	2015 GB_{44}	—	February 13, 2010	Catalina	CSS	·	1.7 km	MPC · JPL
506000	2015 GA_{48}	—	May 15, 2004	Socorro	LINEAR	VER	3.9 km	MPC · JPL

back to top

== Meaning of names ==
As minor planet discoveries are confirmed, they are given a permanent number by the IAU's Minor Planet Center (MPC), and the discoverers can then submit names for them, following the IAU's naming conventions. The list below concerns those minor planets in the specified number-range that have received names, and explains the meanings of those names.

Official naming citations of newly named small Solar System bodies are approved and published in a bulletin by IAU's Working Group for Small Bodies Nomenclature (WGSBN). Before May 2021, citations were published in MPC's Minor Planet Circulars for many decades. Recent citations can also be found on the JPL Small-Body Database (SBDB). Until his death in 2016, German astronomer Lutz D. Schmadel compiled these citations into the Dictionary of Minor Planet Names (DMP) and regularly updated the collection.

Based on Paul Herget's The Names of the Minor Planets, Schmadel also researched the unclear origin of numerous asteroids, most of which had been named prior to World War II. This article incorporates text from this source, which is in the public domain: SBDB New namings may only be added to this list below after official publication as the preannouncement of names is condemned. The WGSBN publishes a comprehensive guideline for the naming rules of non-cometary small Solar System bodies.

Named minor planet	Provisional	This minor planet was named for...	Ref · Catalog
505906 Raozihe	2015 DV_{223}	Rao Zihe (born 1950), a Chinese biophysicist and former president of Nankai University	IAU · 505906
