= List of asteroid close approaches to Earth in 2018 =

- Asteroids which came closer to Earth than the Moon in 2018 by time of discovery
- After closest approach: 43 (55.8%)
- < 24 hours before: 6 (7.8%)
- up to 7 days before: 26 (33.8%)
- > one week before: 0 (0.0%)
- > 7 weeks before: 0 (0.0%)
- > one year before: 2 (2.6%)
Other years

Simulated animation of 2017 YE5, a binary system asteroid, which came within 15.5 lunar distances in June 2019

Below is the list of asteroid close approaches to Earth in 2018.

== Timeline of known close approaches less than one lunar distance from Earth ==
A list of known near-Earth asteroid close approaches less than 1 lunar distance (0.0025696 AU (384,410 km; 238,860 mi)) from Earth in 2018, based on the close approach database of the Center for Near-Earth Object Studies (CNEOS).

For reference, the radius of Earth is approximately 0.0000426 AU (6,370 km; 3,960 mi) or 0.0166 lunar distances.
Geosynchronous satellites have an orbit with semi-major axis length of 0.000282 AU (42,200 km; 26,200 mi) or 0.110 lunar distances. Five asteroids (2018 BD, 2018 PD20, 2018 UA, 2018 WG, and 2018 WV1) are confirmed to have passed within this distance, and unconfirmed or confirmed but poorly observed asteroids A106fgF, A107j4q, ZB0A262, 2018 DN_{4}, ZGBE54F, A1080DC 2018 VQ_{10}, ZW87F01, and ZW900BE may have also passed within this distance.

The largest asteroid to pass within 1 LD of Earth in 2018 was 2018 AH with an estimated diameter of around 137 meters and an absolute magnitude of 22.5. The fastest asteroid to pass within 1 LD of Earth in 2018 was 2018 GE3 that passed Earth with a velocity with respect to Earth of 29.6 km/s (66,000 mph). (Note: 2018 GE3 passed Earth with a velocity with respect to Earth of 29.6 km/s and was approaching the Sun at 35.9 km/s.)

The CNEOS database of close approaches lists some close approaches a full orbit or more before the discovery of the object, derived by orbit calculation. The list below only includes close approaches that are evidenced by observations, thus the pre-discovery close approaches are only included if the object was found by precovery.

This list and relevant databases do not consider impacts as close approaches, thus this list does not include 2018 LA, an asteroid which was predicted to impact on Earth and burned up in its atmosphere, as well as several more objects that collided with Earth's atmosphere in 2018 which weren't discovered in advance, but were observed visually or recorded by sensors designed to detect detonation of nuclear devices.

Rows highlighted red indicate objects which were not discovered until after closest approach

Rows highlighted yellow indicate objects discovered less than 24 hours before closest approach

Rows highlighted green indicate objects discovered more than one week before closest approach

Rows highlighted turquoise indicate objects discovered more than 7 weeks before closest approach

Rows highlighted blue indicate objects discovered more than one year before closest approach
(i.e. objects successfully cataloged on a previous orbit, rather than being detected during final approach)

Date of closest approach	Date discovered	Object	Nominal geocentric distance (AU) (Note: Distance from the center of Earth to the center of the object. See the NASA/JPL Solar System Dynamics Glossary: Geocentric. Earth has a radius of approximately 6,400 km.)	Nominal geocentric distance (LD)	Size (m) (approximate)	(H) (abs. mag.)	Closer approach to Moon	Refs
2018-01-02	2018-01-04	2018 AH	0.00199 AU (298,000 km; 185,000 mi)	0.773 (Note: Largest known asteroid to pass so close to Earth since 2002 JE9 in 1971.)	77–170	22.7	—	data · 2018 AH
2018-01-15	2018-01-17	2018 BW	0.00112 AU (168,000 km; 104,000 mi)	0.435	6.4–14	28.1	—	data · 2018 BW
2018-01-16	2018-01-17	2018 BR_{1}	0.000877 AU (131,200 km; 81,500 mi)	0.341	3.3–7.5	29.5	—	data · 2018 BR_{1}
2018-01-18	2018-01-18	2018 BD	0.000262 AU (39,200 km; 24,400 mi)	0.102	2.5–5.7	30.1	—	data · 2018 BD
2018-01-19	2018-01-20	2018 BF3	0.00162 AU (242,000 km; 151,000 mi)	0.632	17–38	26.0	—	data · 2018 BF_{3}
2018-01-19	2018-01-17	2018 BC	0.00189 AU (283,000 km; 176,000 mi)	0.734	3.5–7.8	29.4	—	data · 2018 BC
2018-01-19	2018-01-18	2018 BX	0.00188 AU (281,000 km; 175,000 mi)	0.730	4–9	29.1	—	data · 2018 BX
2018-01-20	2018-01-24	2018 BL_{11}	0.00202 AU (302,000 km; 188,000 mi)	0.788	6.1–14	28.2	✓	data · 2018 BL_{11}
2018-01-24	2018-01-27	2018 BN_{6}	0.00242 AU (362,000 km; 225,000 mi)	0.943	12–26	26.8	—	data · 2018 BN_{6}
2018-02-04	2018-02-07	2018 CS_{1}	0.00230 AU (344,000 km; 214,000 mi)	0.896	6.1–14	28.2	—	data · 2018 CS_{1}
2018-02-06	2018-02-07	2018 CF2	0.000650 AU (97,200 km; 60,400 mi)	0.253	6.7–15	28.0	—	data · 2018 CF_{2}
2018-02-06	2018-02-04	2018 CC	0.00126 AU (188,000 km; 117,000 mi)	0.492	13–28	26.6	—	data · 2018 CC
2018-02-09	2018-02-08	2018 CN2	0.000467 AU (69,900 km; 43,400 mi)	0.182	7.3–16	27.8	—	data · 2018 CN_{2}
2018-02-09	2018-02-04	2018 CB	0.000466 AU (69,700 km; 43,300 mi)	0.181	18–39	25.9	—	data · 2018 CB
2018-02-16	2018-02-10	2018 CD_{3}	0.00237 AU (355,000 km; 220,000 mi)	0.924	5.1–11	28.6	—	data · 2018 CD_{3}
2018-02-21	2018-02-22	2018 DQ	0.000671 AU (100,400 km; 62,400 mi)	0.261	4–9	29.1	—	data · 2018 DQ
2018-02-24	2018-02-26	2018 DN_{4}	0.00140 AU (209,000 km; 130,000 mi)	0.543 (Note: 0.00141+0.00156 −0.00137 AU, approach range: 0.018 to 1.157 LD. There is no chance that it impacted Earth, as the minimum distance (0.018 LD) is still roughly 410 kilometers above Earth's surface.)	5.2–12	28.5	?	data · 2018 DN_{4}
2018-02-25	2018-02-23	2018 DU	0.00190 AU (284,000 km; 177,000 mi)	0.739	5.8–13	28.3	—	data · 2018 DU
2018-03-02	2018-02-26	2018 DV1	0.000753 AU (112,600 km; 70,000 mi)	0.293	5.6–12	28.4	—	data · 2018 DV_{1}
2018-03-14	2018-03-12	2018 EZ_{2}	0.00144 AU (215,000 km; 134,000 mi)	0.560	15–34	26.6	✓	data · 2018 EZ_{2}
2018-03-17	2018-03-19	2018 FL_{29}	0.00148 AU (221,000 km; 138,000 mi)	0.578	2.6–5.7	30.1	—	data · 2018 FL_{29}
2018-03-18	2018-03-21	2018 FE_{3}	0.000978 AU (146,300 km; 90,900 mi)	0.381	9.7–22	27.2	—	data · 2018 FE_{3}
2018-03-19	2018-03-20	2018 FQ_{3}	0.00187 AU (280,000 km; 174,000 mi)	0.727	5.1–11	28.6	—	data · 2018 FQ_{3}
2018-03-23	2018-03-21	2018 FZ_{3}	0.00129 AU (193,000 km; 120,000 mi)	0.501	8.1–18	27.6	—	data · 2018 FZ_{3}
2018-03-30	2018-03-28	2018 FK_{5}	0.00100 AU (150,000 km; 93,000 mi)	0.391	5.8–13	28.3	—	data · 2018 FK_{5}
2018-04-07	2018-04-11	2018 GR_{11}	0.00177 AU (265,000 km; 165,000 mi)	0.688	5.3–12	28.5	—	data · 2018 GR_{11}
2018-04-10	2008-04-13	2008 GY_{21} aka 2018 GY_{3}	0.00201 AU (301,000 km; 187,000 mi)	0.783	8–18	27.6	—	data · 2008 GY_{21}
2018-04-12	2018-04-11	2018 GD_{2}	0.00201 AU (301,000 km; 187,000 mi)	0.781	3.3–7.5	29.5	—	data · 2018 GD_{2}
2018-04-15	2018-04-14	2018 GE3	0.00129 AU (193,000 km; 120,000 mi)	0.502	46–100	23.8	✓	data · 2018 GE_{3}
2018-04-21	2018-04-23	2018 HW_{1}	0.00229 AU (343,000 km; 213,000 mi)	0.893	18–41	25.8	—	data · 2018 HW_{1}
2018-04-22	2018-04-21	2018 HV	0.00103 AU (154,000 km; 96,000 mi)	0.403	4.4–9.9	28.9	—	data · 2018 HV
2018-05-09 (Note: A perigee during the asteroid's capture as temporary satellite by Earth)	2020-02-15 (Note: Precovery around this close approach: 2018-05-09)	2020 CD3	0.000172 AU (25,700 km; 16,000 mi)	0.067	1.2–2.7	31.7	—	data · 2020 CD_{3}
2018-05-15	2010-11-30	2010 WC9	0.00136 AU (203,000 km; 126,000 mi)	0.528	53–120	23.5	—	data · 2010 WC_{9}
2018-05-23	2018-05-22	2018 KW_{1}	0.00100 AU (150,000 km; 93,000 mi)	0.388	3.1–6.8	29.7	—	data · 2018 KW_{1}
2018-05-26	2018-05-24	2018 KY_{2}	0.00200 AU (299,000 km; 186,000 mi)	0.779	9.7–22	27.2	—	data · 2018 KY_{2}
2018-06-15	2018-06-11	2018 LV_{3}	0.00220 AU (329,000 km; 205,000 mi)	0.858	13–30	26.5	—	data · 2018 LV_{3}
2018-06-16	2018-06-17	2018 MZ_{4}	0.00139 AU (208,000 km; 129,000 mi)	0.541	4.6–10	28.8	✓	data · 2018 MZ_{4}
2018-07-07	2018-07-08	2018 NX	0.000782 AU (117,000 km; 72,700 mi)	0.304	7.7–17	27.7	—	data · 2018 NX
2018-07-08	2018-07-08	2018 NW	0.000833 AU (124,600 km; 77,400 mi)	0.324	7.3–16	27.8	—	data · 2018 NW
2018-08-10	2018-08-11	2018 PD20	0.000224 AU (33,500 km; 20,800 mi)	0.087	8.8–20	27.4	—	data · 2018 PD_{20}
2018-08-21	2018-08-21	2018 QR_{1}	0.000590 AU (88,300 km; 54,800 mi)	0.230	9.5–21	27.2	—	data · 2018 QR_{1}
2018-09-03	2018-09-07	2018 RR_{1}	0.00243 AU (364,000 km; 226,000 mi)	0.945	2.7–6	30.0	—	data · 2018 RR_{1}
2018-09-05	2018-09-06	2018 RS	0.000710 AU (106,200 km; 66,000 mi)	0.276	2.7–5.9	30.0	—	data · 2018 RS
2018-09-06	2018-09-07	2018 RE_{2}	0.00255 AU (381,000 km; 237,000 mi)	0.991	5.3–12	28.5	—	data · 2018 RE_{2}
2018-09-07	2018-09-09	2018 RJ_{3}	0.00112 AU (168,000 km; 104,000 mi)	0.435	7.3–16	27.8	—	data · 2018 RJ_{3}
2018-09-08	2018-09-07	2018 RW	0.00114 AU (171,000 km; 106,000 mi)	0.445	2–4.5	30.6	—	data · 2018 RW
2018-09-09	2018-09-03	2018 RC	0.00150 AU (224,000 km; 139,000 mi)	0.584	27–61	24.9	—	data · 2018 RC
2018-09-12	2018-09-13	2018 RY_{5}	0.00120 AU (180,000 km; 112,000 mi)	0.467	13–28	26.6	—	data · 2018 RY_{5}
2018-09-12	2018-09-13	2018 RZ_{5}	0.000331 AU (49,500 km; 30,800 mi)	0.129	3–6.8	29.7	—	data · 2018 RZ_{5}
2018-09-15	2018-09-16	2018 SM	0.000285 AU (42,600 km; 26,500 mi)	0.111	3.5–7.8	29.4	—	data · 2018 SM
2018-09-18	2018-09-17	2018 SC	0.00179 AU (268,000 km; 166,000 mi)	0.699	6.7–15	28.0	—	data · 2018 SC
2018-09-25	2018-09-21	2018 SD_{2}	0.000587 AU (87,800 km; 54,600 mi)	0.229	5.1–11	28.6	—	data · 2018 SD_{2}
2018-09-30	2018-10-02	2018 TC	0.00204 AU (305,000 km; 190,000 mi)	0.795	13–28	26.6	—	data · 2018 TC
2018-10-06	2018-10-05	2018 TV_{5}	0.000682 AU (102,000 km; 63,400 mi)	0.265	3.3–7.5	29.5	—	data · 2018 TV_{5}
2018-10-07	2018-10-05	2018 TV	0.00190 AU (284,000 km; 177,000 mi)	0.741	5.1–11	28.6	—	data · 2018 TV
2018-10-17	2018-10-18	2018 UL	0.00148 AU (221,000 km; 138,000 mi)	0.575	3.8–8.6	29.2	✓	data · 2018 UL
2018-10-19	2018-10-19	2018 UA	0.0000914 AU (13,670 km; 8,500 mi)	0.036	2.4–5.4	30.2	—	data · 2018 UA
2018-11-02	2018-11-03	2018 VP1	0.00101 AU (151,000 km; 94,000 mi)	0.393	1.8–3.9	30.9	—	data · 2018 VP_{1}
2018-11-05	2018-11-08	2018 VT_{5}	0.00123 AU (184,000 km; 114,000 mi)	0.481	5.3–12	28.5	—	data · 2018 VT_{5}
2018-11-06	2018-11-07	2018 VO_{5}	0.000942 AU (140,900 km; 87,600 mi)	0.367	12–27	26.7	—	data · 2018 VO_{5}
2018-11-10	2018-11-04	2018 VX_{1} aka 2018 VA_{6}	0.00255 AU (381,000 km; 237,000 mi)	0.992	8.4–19	27.5	—	data · 2018 VX_{1}
2018-11-13	2018-11-10	2018 VC_{7}	0.00224 AU (335,000 km; 208,000 mi)	0.871	8.8–20	27.4	—	data · 2018 VC_{7}
2018-11-13	2018-11-16	2018 WA_{1}	0.00168 AU (251,000 km; 156,000 mi)	0.653	2.5–5.7	30.1	—	data · 2018 WA_{1}
2018-11-14	2018-11-15	2018 VJ_{10}	0.00133 AU (199,000 km; 124,000 mi)	0.517	5.1–11	28.6	✓	data · 2018 VJ_{10}
2018-11-16	2018-11-17	2018 WH	0.00127 AU (190,000 km; 118,000 mi)	0.496	2.9–6.5	29.8	—	data · 2018 WH
2018-11-16	2018-11-17	2018 WG	0.000206 AU (30,800 km; 19,100 mi)	0.080	3.7–8.2	29.3	—	data · 2018 WG
2018-11-18	2018-11-17	2018 WE	0.00160 AU (239,000 km; 149,000 mi)	0.624	5.6–12	28.4	✓	data · 2018 WE
2018-11-19	2018-11-17	2018 WJ	0.000794 AU (118,800 km; 73,800 mi)	0.309	7–16	27.9	—	data · 2018 WJ
2018-11-25	2018-11-26	2018 WE_{1}	0.000716 AU (107,100 km; 66,600 mi)	0.279	16–36	26.1	—	data · 2018 WE_{1}
2018-11-27	2018-11-28	2018 WZ_{1}	0.000729 AU (109,100 km; 67,800 mi)	0.284	3.5–7.8	29.4	—	data · 2018 WZ_{1}
2018-11-28	2018-11-29	2018 WA_{3}	0.00216 AU (323,000 km; 201,000 mi)	0.839	6.7–15	28.0	—	data · 2018 WA_{3}
2018-11-30	2018-11-29	2018 WG_{2}	0.00134 AU (200,000 km; 125,000 mi)	0.520	2.5–5.7	30.1	—	data · 2018 WG_{2}
2018-12-02	2018-11-29	2018 WV1	0.000221 AU (33,100 km; 20,500 mi)	0.086	2.3–5.2	30.3	—	data · 2018 WV_{1}
2018-12-11	2018-12-13	2018 XA_{4}	0.00249 AU (372,000 km; 231,000 mi)	0.969	4.2–9.4	29.0	✓	data · 2018 XA_{4}
2018-12-27	2018-12-28	2018 YL_{2}	0.000398 AU (59,500 km; 37,000 mi)	0.155	3.5–7.8	29.4	—	data · 2018 YL_{2}
2018-12-28	2018-12-29	2018 YO_{2}	0.00131 AU (196,000 km; 122,000 mi)	0.510	2.9–6.5	29.8	—	data · 2018 YO_{2}
2018-12-28	2019-01-03	2019 AW_{2}	0.00111 AU (166,000 km; 103,000 mi)	0.430	22–50	25.4	—	data · 2019 AW_{2}

In addition to the confirmed asteroids on the above list, which feature in the CNEOS close approach database, there have been well-observed unconfirmed or confirmed but poorly observed objects with a 50% or greater chance of passing within 1 LD of the Earth, which are listed separately below.

Date of closest approach	Date discovered	Object	Nominal geocentric distance (AU)	Nominal geocentric distance (LD)	Size (m) (approximate)	(H) (abs. mag.)	Closer approach to Moon	Refs
2018-01-22	2018-01-22	A106fgF	Potential Impact?	0.0011 (Note: distance error: 0.0000107 AU, approach range: 0 to 0.0052 LD. Assuming the observations were not made in error, there was a (~9%) this asteroid hit the Earth (Impact path). However, there was no record of an impact reported, so if it did indeed impact Earth, it was likely in an uninhabited region or in the Pacific ocean. (The further west in the impact path, the larger the asteroid would be. If it hit west of Africa or in the Indian ocean, it would have been several meters across and have been recorded.) The asteroid is unconfirmed and will likely never receive a provisional designation.)	2–5	30.6	—	Src
2018-01-25	2018-01-26	ZB0A262	0.000401 AU (60,000 km; 37,300 mi)	0.16 (Note: distance error: 0.000305 AU, approach range: 0.037 to 0.27 LD. The asteroid is unconfirmed and will likely never receive a provisional designation.)	2–5	30.6	—	Src
2018-04-12	2018-04-13	ZGBE54F	0.000469 AU (70,200 km; 43,600 mi)	0.18 (Note: distance error: 0.000347 AU, approach range: 0.047 to 0.32 LD. The asteroid is unconfirmed and will likely never receive a provisional designation.)	2–7	30.0	—	Src
2018-06-17	2018-06-17	A107j4q	0.000206 AU (30,800 km; 19,100 mi)	0.080 (Note: distance error: 0.00000608 AU, approach range: 0.078 to 0.082 LD. The asteroid is unconfirmed and will likely never receive a provisional designation.)	4–11	28.9	—	Src · diagram
2018-06-23	2018-06-24	A107pL2	0.000525 AU (78,500 km; 48,800 mi)	0.20 (Note: distance error: 0.000184 AU, approach range: 0.13 to 0.28 LD. The asteroid is unconfirmed and will likely never receive a provisional designation.)	3–9	29.5	—	Src
2018-07-04	2018-07-05	ZN2E090	0.00132 AU (197,000 km; 123,000 mi)	0.51 (Note: distance error: 0.000296 AU, approach range: 0.40 to 0.63 LD. The asteroid is unconfirmed and will likely never receive a provisional designation.)	4–12	28.8	—	Src
2018-08-12	2018-08-13	A1080DC	0.000284 AU (42,500 km; 26,400 mi)	0.11 (Note: distance error: 0.0000651 AU, approach range: 0.085 to 0.136 LD. The asteroid is unconfirmed and will likely never receive a provisional designation.)	1–4	31.3	—	Src
2018-10-06	2018-10-06	ZTF01Z9	0.00170 AU (254,000 km; 158,000 mi)	0.66 (Note: distance error: 0.000600 AU, approach range: 0.43 to 0.89 LD. The asteroid is unconfirmed and will likely never receive a provisional designation.)	4–12	28.8	—	Src
2018-11-01	2018-11-01	2018 VQ_{10}	0.000276 AU (41,300 km; 25,700 mi)	0.11 (Note: distance error: 0.0000181 AU, approach range: 0.100 to 0.115 LD.)	2–5	30.6	—	Temp. src
2018-11-11	2018-11-11	2018 VS_{10}	0.00103 AU (154,000 km; 96,000 mi)	0.40	3–10	29.1	—	Temp. src
2018-11-15	2018-11-17	ZW84BCD	0.000845 AU (126,400 km; 78,500 mi)	0.33 (Note: distance error: 0.0000114 AU, approach range: 0.325 to 0.333 LD. The asteroid is unconfirmed and will likely never receive a provisional designation.)	2–7	30.0	—	Src
2018-11-16	2018-11-17	ZW87F01	0.000594 AU (88,900 km; 55,200 mi)	0.23 (Note: distance error: 0.000583 AU, approach range: 0.017 to 0.46 LD. The asteroid is unconfirmed and will likely never receive a provisional designation. There is no chance of impact as the asteroid was discovered after its closest approach.)	1–2	32.3	—	Src
2018-11-28	2018-11-29	ZW900BE	0.000224 AU (33,500 km; 20,800 mi)	0.087 (Note: distance error: 0.000165 AU, approach range: 0.023 to 0.152 LD. The asteroid is unconfirmed and will likely never receive a provisional designation.)	1–4	31.2	—	Src
2018-12-30	2018-12-31	2018 YJ_{4}	0.000725 AU (108,500 km; 67,400 mi)	0.28	2–7	29.8	—	Temp. src

=== Warning times by size ===
This sub-section visualises the warning times of the close approaches listed in the table of confirmed close approaches, depending on the size of the asteroid. The sizes of the charts show the relative sizes of the asteroids to scale. For comparison, the approximate size of a person is also shown. This is based the absolute magnitude of each asteroid, an approximate measure of size based on brightness.

Absolute magnitude H ≥ 30 (smallest)

Silhouette of man standing and facing forward

(size of a person for comparison)

Absolute magnitude 30 > H ≥ 29

Absolute magnitude 29 > H ≥ 28

Absolute magnitude 28 > H ≥ 27

Absolute magnitude 27 > H ≥ 26

Absolute magnitude 26 > H ≥ 25

Absolute magnitude 25 > H (largest)

- After closest approach: 1 (25.0%)
- < 24 hours before: 0 (0.0%)
- up to 7 days before: 2 (50.0%)
- > one week before: 0 (0.0%)
- > 7 weeks before: 0 (0.0%)
- > one year before: 1 (25.0%)

== Timeline of close approaches less than one lunar distance from the Moon ==
The number of asteroids listed here are significantly less than those of asteroids that approach Earth for several reasons. Asteroids that approach Earth not only move faster, but are brighter and are easier to detect with modern surveys because:

- Asteroids that come closer to Earth are a higher priority to confirm, and only confirmed asteroids are listed with a lunocentric approach distance.
- Those that closely approach the Moon are frequently lost in its glare, making them harder to confirm. They are similarly hard to discover during the new moon, when the Moon is too close to the Sun to detect asteroids while they are near the Moon.

These factors severely limit the amount of Moon-approaching asteroids, to a level many times lower than the asteroids detected passing as close to Earth.

Date of closest approach	Object	Nominal lunocentric distance (AU) (Note: Distance from the center of the Moon to the center of the object. The Moon has a radius of approximately 1,740 km.)	Nominal lunocentric distance (LD)	Size (m) (approximate)	(H)	approach distance to Earth (LD)	Refs
2018-01-15	2018 BW	0.00212 AU (317,000 km; 197,000 mi)	0.82	5–17	28.1	0.43	data · 2018 BW
2018-01-19	2018 BD	0.00123 AU (184,000 km; 114,000 mi)	0.48	2–6	30.2	0.10	data · 2018 BD
2018-01-20	2018 BL_{11}	0.00186 AU (278,000 km; 173,000 mi)	0.72	5–15	28.3	0.79	data · 2018 BL_{11}
2018-01-24	ZB0A262	0.00148 AU (221,000 km; 138,000 mi)	0.57 (Note: distance error: 0.000633 AU, approach range: 0.33 to 0.82 LD. The asteroid is unconfirmed and will likely never receive a provisional designation.)	2–5	30.6	0.16	Src
2018-02-03	2018 CT	0.00249 AU (372,000 km; 231,000 mi)	0.97	15–47	25.8	1.69	data · 2018 CT
2018-02-06	2018 CF2	0.00204 AU (305,000 km; 190,000 mi)	0.79	4–20	28.0	0.25	data · 2018 CF_{2}
2018-02-24	2018 DN_{4}	0.00128 AU (191,000 km; 119,000 mi)	0.50 (Note: 0.00128+0.00123 −0.000241 AU. Approach range: 0.41 to 0.98 LD.)	4–14	28.4	0.55	data · 2018 DN_{4}
2018-03-01	2018 DV1	0.000893 AU (133,600 km; 83,000 mi)	0.35	4–15	28.4	0.29	data · 2018 CD_{1}
2018-03-14	2018 EZ_{2}	0.00136 AU (203,000 km; 126,000 mi)	0.53	10–34	26.5	0.56	data · 2018 EZ_{2}
2018-03-17	2018 FL_{29}	0.00187 AU (280,000 km; 174,000 mi)	0.73	2–7	30.1	0.58	data · 2018 FL_{29}
2018-03-17	2018 FE_{3}	0.00118 AU (177,000 km; 110,000 mi)	0.46	8–27	27.1	0.38	data · 2018 FE_{3}
2018-03-30	2018 FK_{5}	0.00157 AU (235,000 km; 146,000 mi)	0.61	4–16	28.3	0.39	data · 2018 FK_{5}
2018-04-13	2018 GD_{2}	0.00221 AU (331,000 km; 205,000 mi)	0.86	3–9	29.4	0.78	data · 2018 GD_{2}
2018-04-15	2018 GE3	0.000876 AU (131,000 km; 81,400 mi)	0.34	37–138	23.6	0.50	data · 2018 GE_{3}
2018-05-23	2018 KW_{1}	0.00146 AU (218,000 km; 136,000 mi)	0.57	3–8	29.7	0.39	data · 2018 KW_{1}
2018-06-02	2018 LA	0.00208 AU (311,000 km; 193,000 mi)	0.83	2–3	30.5	Impact	data · 2018 LA
2018-06-16	2018 MZ_{4}	0.000527 AU (78,800 km; 49,000 mi)	0.20	4–11	28.8	0.54	data · 2018 MZ_{4}
2018-06-17	A107j4p	0.00256 AU (383,000 km; 238,000 mi)	0.995 (Note: distance error: 0.00000167 AU, approach range: 0.9942 to 0.9955 LD. The asteroid is unconfirmed and will likely never receive a provisional designation.)	4–11	28.9	0.080	Src
2018-06-23	A107pL2	0.00208 AU (311,000 km; 193,000 mi)	0.81 (Note: distance error: 0.000198 AU, approach range: 0.73 to 0.89 LD. The asteroid is unconfirmed and will likely never receive a provisional designation.)	3–9	29.5	0.20	Src
2018-07-02	2018 NH	0.00109 AU (163,000 km; 101,000 mi)	0.43	24–88	24.6	1.13	data · 2018 NH
2018-07-05	ZN2E090	0.00168 AU (251,000 km; 156,000 mi)	0.65 (Note: distance error: 0.000194 AU, approach range: 0.58 to 0.73 LD. The asteroid is unconfirmed and will likely never receive a provisional designation.)	4–12	28.8	0.51	Src
2018-07-07	2018 NX	0.00152 AU (227,000 km; 141,000 mi)	0.59	7–18	27.7	0.30	data · 2018 NX
2018-07-08	2018 NW	0.00165 AU (247,000 km; 153,000 mi)	0.64	6–18	27.8	0.32	data · 2018 NW
2018-07-24	2018 OF_{2}	0.000713 AU (106,700 km; 66,300 mi)	0.28	8–21	27.4	1.14	data · 2018 OF_{2}
2018-08-04	2018 PY_{7}	0.00182 AU (272,000 km; 169,000 mi)	0.71	9–33	26.7	1.07	data · 2018 PY_{7}
2018-08-10	2018 PD20	0.00117 AU (175,000 km; 109,000 mi)	0.46	7–22	27.4	0.087	data · 2018 PD_{20}
2018-08-12	2018 OF_{2}	0.00178 AU (266,000 km; 165,000 mi)	0.69	1–4	31.3	0.11	data · 2018 OF_{2}
2018-08-15	2018 PY_{23}	0.00117 AU (175,000 km; 109,000 mi)	0.45	6–17	27.9	1.32	data · 2018 PY_{23}
2018-08-19	ZTF00VP	0.00149 AU (223,000 km; 139,000 mi)	0.58 (Note: distance error: Unknown, Approach range: Unknown. The asteroid is unconfirmed and will likely never receive a provisional designation.)	3–11	29.0	1.12	Src
2018-09-03	2018 RR_{1}	0.00254 AU (380,000 km; 236,000 mi)	0.990	2–7	29.8	0.95	data · 2018 RR_{1}
2018-09-05	2018 RS	0.00220 AU (329,000 km; 205,000 mi)	0.85	2–12	29.5	0.28	data · 2018 RS
2018-09-07	2018 RJ_{3}	0.00200 AU (299,000 km; 186,000 mi)	0.78	6–19	27.8	0.44	data · 2018 RJ_{3}
2018-09-08	2018 RW	0.00256 AU (383,000 km; 238,000 mi)	0.997	2–7	30.3	0.44	data · 2018 RW
2018-09-10	2018 RC	0.00244 AU (365,000 km; 227,000 mi)	0.95	23–87	24.6	0.58	data · 2018 RC
2018-09-12	2018 RZ_{5}	0.00134 AU (200,000 km; 125,000 mi)	0.52	2-8	29.7	0.13	data · 2018 RZ_{5}
2018-09-15	2018 SM	0.00188 AU (281,000 km; 175,000 mi)	0.73	3-9	29.4	0.11	data · 2018 SM
2018-09-15	2018 SN_{3}	0.00229 AU (343,000 km; 213,000 mi)	0.89	2–7	29.9	0.51	data · 2018 SN_{3}
2018-09-19	2018 RF_{8}	0.00154 AU (230,000 km; 143,000 mi)	0.60	14–50	25.8	1.37	data · 2018 RF_{8}
2018-09-24	2018 SD_{2}	0.00193 AU (289,000 km; 179,000 mi)	0.75	4-12	28.6	0.23	data · 2018 SD_{2}
2018-10-06	2018 TV_{5}	0.000749 AU (112,000 km; 69,600 mi)	0.29	3–9	29.5	0.27	data · 2018 TV_{5}
2018-10-17	2018 UL	0.000992 AU (148,400 km; 92,200 mi)	0.39	3–11	29.1	0.57	data · 2018 UL
2018-10-19	2018 UA	0.00189 AU (283,000 km; 176,000 mi)	0.74	2–6	30.2	0.036	data · 2018 UA
2018-11-01	2018 VQ_{10}	0.00215 AU (322,000 km; 200,000 mi)	0.84	2–5	30.6	0.11	Temp. Src
2018-11-03	2018 VV_{3}	0.00131 AU (196,000 km; 122,000 mi)	0.51	13–36	26.2	1.13	data · 2018 VV_{3}
2018-11-04	2018 WS	0.00212 AU (317,000 km; 197,000 mi)	0.89	11–34	26.5	1.74	data · 2018 WS
2018-11-05	2018 VO_{5}	0.00247 AU (370,000 km; 230,000 mi)	0.96	9–33	26.7	0.37	data · 2018 VO_{5}
2018-11-06	ZV33FBC	0.00147 AU (220,000 km; 137,000 mi)	0.57 (Note: distance error: 0.000390 AU, approach range: 0.42 to 0.72 LD. The asteroid is unconfirmed and will likely never receive a provisional designation.)	9–28	26.9	0.57	Src
2018-11-14	2018 VJ_{10}	0.00124 AU (186,000 km; 115,000 mi)	0.48	4–12	28.6	0.52	data · 2018 VJ_{10}
2018-11-15	2018 WA_{1}	0.00243 AU (364,000 km; 226,000 mi)	0.95	2–7	30.0	0.65	data · 2018 WA_{1}
2018-11-15	ZW87F01	0.00195 AU (292,000 km; 181,000 mi)	0.76 (Note: distance error: 0.000506 AU, approach range: 0.56 to 0.95 LD. The asteroid is unconfirmed and will likely never receive a provisional designation.)	1–2	32.3	0.23	Src
2018-11-16	2018 WH	0.00215 AU (322,000 km; 200,000 mi)	0.83	2–8	29.8	0.50	data · 2018 WH
2018-11-18	2018 WE	0.00133 AU (199,000 km; 124,000 mi)	0.52	4–16	28.3	0.62	data · 2018 WE
2018-11-19	2018 WJ	0.00228 AU (341,000 km; 212,000 mi)	0.89	6–26	27.5	0.31	data · 2018 WJ
2018-11-25	2018 WE_{1}	0.00142 AU (212,000 km; 132,000 mi)	0.55	12–51	26.0	0.28	data · 2018 WE_{1}
2018-11-25	ZTF01p2	0.00246 AU (368,000 km; 229,000 mi)	0.96 (Note: distance error: 0.0000329 AU, approach range: 0.943 to 0.968 LD. The asteroid is unconfirmed and will likely never receive a provisional designation.)	10–31	26.7	1.47	Src
2018-11-25	2018 WH_{1}	0.00197 AU (295,000 km; 183,000 mi)	0.77	4–14	28.5	1.18	data · 2018 WH_{1}
2018-11-27	2018 WZ_{1}	0.00225 AU (337,000 km; 209,000 mi)	0.88	3–9	29.4	0.28	data · 2018 WZ_{1}
2018-11-28	ZW900BE	0.00255 AU (381,000 km; 237,000 mi)	0.993 (Note: distance error: 0.0000552 AU, approach range: 0.972 to 1.015 LD. The asteroid is unconfirmed and will likely never receive a provisional designation.)	1–4	31.2	0.087	Src
2018-12-05	2018 WV_{1}	0.00225 AU (337,000 km; 209,000 mi)	0.88	2–6	30.2	0.086	data · 2018 WV_{1}
2018-12-08	2018 XP_{2}	0.00176 AU (263,000 km; 164,000 mi)	0.68	5–16	28.1	1.009	data · 2018 XP_{2}
2018-12-11	2018 XA_{4}	0.00158 AU (236,000 km; 147,000 mi)	0.61	3–11	29.1	0.97	data · 2018 XA_{4}
2018-12-27	2018 YL_{2}	0.00131 AU (196,000 km; 122,000 mi)	0.51	3–10	29.3	0.15	data · 2018 YL_{2}
2018-12-30	2018 YJ_{4}	0.000253 AU (37,800 km; 23,500 mi)	0.98	2–7	29.8	0.28	Temp. src

== Additional examples ==
Radar images of binary asteroid 2017 YE5 upon close approach in June 2018

Radar animation of 2001 KB_{67} after its passage in May 2018

An example list of near-Earth asteroids that passed more than 1 lunar distance (384,400 km or 0.00256 AU) from Earth in 2018.

Object	Size meters	lunar distances	Date	Ref
(276033) 2002 AJ129	624	10.9	2018-02-04	JPL
3752 Camillo	2306	53.6	2018-02-20	JPL
(884793) 2017 VR12	271	3.76	2018-03-07	JPL
1981 Midas	3400	34.9	2018-03-21	JPL
2018 GU_{1}	46	1.70	2018-04-08	JPL
(388945) 2008 TZ_{3}	285	6.48	2018-05-09	JPL
(68347) 2001 KB_{67}	359	9.50	2018-05-29	JPL
2017 YE5	860	15.5	2018-06-21	JPL
2018 NL	32	1.42	2018-06-28	JPL
(4953) 1990 MU	2800	41.6	2018-11-29	JPL
2013 VX_{4}	62	4.09	2018-12-09	JPL
(163899) 2003 SD220	800	7.36	2018-12-22	JPL

== Statistics ==
Approaches by month
month	<1 LD	<5 LD
January	11	31
February	9	21
March	7	30
April	7	26
May	3	21
June	5	11
July	3	9
August	3	12
September	13	50
October	5	26
November	21	39
December	6	23

Approaches by size
Abs. mag	<1 LD	<5 LD
H <20	0	0
<21	0	1
<22	0	0
<23	1	1
<24	2	6
<25	1	20
<26	3	37
<27	10	73
<28	15	84
<29	22	49
<30	22	25
<31	15	16
<32	2	2
<33	1	1

Discoveries by survey
Survey	<1 LD	<5 LD
(568) Mauna Kea	0	1
(703) Catalina Sky Survey	28	98
(704) Lincoln Laboratory ETS	0	2
(D29) XuYi Station, Purple Mountain	0	1
(F51) Pan-STARRS 1	1	11
(F52) Pan-STARRS 2	1	10
(G96) Mt. Lemmon Survey	37	121
(I41) Zwicky Transient Facility	10	37
(Q66) JAXA, Siding Spring Observatory	1	4
(T05) ATLAS-HKO	6	17
(T08) ATLAS-MLO	8	17
(Y00) SONEAR Observatory	1	1

== Virtual Impactors ==
List of asteroids that are listed on the Sentry Risk Table because they have short observation arcs with poorly constrained orbits and have a chance of impacting Earth in 2018. Given a short observation arc, many different orbits fit the observed data. These objects could be millions if not billions of kilometers from Earth on the date of a low probability virtual impactor. For example, 2005 TM_{173} is expected to be 5 AU (700 million km) from Earth in December 2018 around the time of the 3 virtual impactors. 2010 GZ60 was removed from the sentry table in February 2018 after further observations were found by NEOWISE, ruling out any possible impacts.

Cumulatively among the asteroids listed below, there is a roughly 1 in 98,700 chance that any of the asteroids will impact Earth in 2018. Most of this comes from asteroid 2008 US which is only ~2 meters in diameter and had a 1 in 240,000 chance of impact on 18 April 2018.

Also included are asteroids discovered before impact (specifically, 2018 LA) and exceptionally massive fireballs with either an equivalent yield of more than 1 kiloton of TNT or an estimated size of more than 3 meters.

Date	Object	Estimated diameter (meters)	Obs arc (days)	Impact probability (1 in)	Sigma from best-fit orbit (Note: This is a measurement of how far off of the "best fit" orbit the asteroid would have to have for it to hit at this time. Further values from 0 mean that the measured positions of the asteroid used to calculate its orbit would need to be highly inaccurate for it to hit Earth. For reference, 1.0/-1.0=31.7% odds the observations would be this inaccurate, 2.0/-2.0=4.6% odds, 3.0/-3.0=0.27% odds.)	Palermo scale	JPL Horizons nominal geocentric distance (AU)	NEODyS nominal geocentric distance (AU)
2018-01-31	2011 CF_{66} (Note: 2011 CF_{66} has a cumulative probability of 1 in 38,900,000 (Palermo scale -7.16) of impacting Earth in 2018.)	9	0.18	2,100,000,000	0.994	-7.87	1.1 AU (160,000,000 km; 100,000,000 mi)	0.23 AU (34,000,000 km; 21,000,000 mi)
2018-02-10	2008 EL_{68} (Note: 2008 EL_{68} has a cumulative probability of 1 in 1,200,000 (Palermo scale -5.81) of impacting Earth in 2018.)	9	0.071	370,000,000	0.039	-8.38	1.3 AU (190,000,000 km; 120,000,000 mi)	1.1 AU (160,000,000 km; 100,000,000 mi)
2018-02-15	2011 CF_{66}	9	0.18	100,000,000	-2.100	-7.70	1.2 AU (180,000,000 km; 110,000,000 mi)	0.25 AU (37,000,000 km; 23,000,000 mi)
2018-02-15	2011 CF_{66}	9	0.18	140,000,000	-1.183	-7.82	1.2 AU (180,000,000 km; 110,000,000 mi)	0.25 AU (37,000,000 km; 23,000,000 mi)
2018-02-17	2011 CF_{66}	9	0.18	120,000,000	-0.465	-7.67	1.2 AU (180,000,000 km; 110,000,000 mi)	0.25 AU (37,000,000 km; 23,000,000 mi)
2018-02-24	2009 VZ_{39} (Note: 2009 VZ_{39} has a cumulative probability of 1 in 13,600,000 (Palermo scale -6.89) of impacting earth in 2018.)	9	0.043	110,000,000	0.948	-7.63	2.7 AU (400,000,000 km; 250,000,000 mi)	4.1 AU (610,000,000 km; 380,000,000 mi)
2018-02-25	2008 EL_{68}	9	0.071	2,000,000	-0.690	-6.26	1.3 AU (190,000,000 km; 120,000,000 mi)	1.2 AU (180,000,000 km; 110,000,000 mi)
2018-02-26	2015 HV_{182} (Note: 2015 HV_{182} has a cumulative probability of 1 in 239,000,000 (Palermo scale -5.10) of impacting Earth in 2018.)	157	1.0	2,100,000,000	0.096	-5.47	2.4 AU (360,000,000 km; 220,000,000 mi)	2.4 AU (360,000,000 km; 220,000,000 mi)
2018-02-26	2008 JD_{33}	9	0.12	290,000,000	-2.389	-8.34	0.95 AU (142,000,000 km; 88,000,000 mi)	2.8 AU (420,000,000 km; 260,000,000 mi)
2018-03-01	2008 EK_{68}	4	0.040	1,100,000,000	0.697	-9.01	2.9 AU (430,000,000 km; 270,000,000 mi)	2.3 AU (340,000,000 km; 210,000,000 mi)
2018-03-09	2008 EL_{68}	9	0.071	1,700,000,000	1.232	-8.05	1.4 AU (210,000,000 km; 130,000,000 mi)	1.2 AU (180,000,000 km; 110,000,000 mi)
2018-03-10	2008 EL_{68}	9	0.071	1,100,000,000	0.806	-8.35	1.4 AU (210,000,000 km; 130,000,000 mi)	1.2 AU (180,000,000 km; 110,000,000 mi)
2018-03-11	2005 ED224	54	3.1	2,400,000	1.438	-3.72	1.6 AU (240,000,000 km; 150,000,000 mi)	2.1 AU (310,000,000 km; 200,000,000 mi)
2018-03-11	2008 EL_{68}	9	0.071	2,900,000	0.544	-6.01	1.4 AU (210,000,000 km; 130,000,000 mi)	1.2 AU (180,000,000 km; 110,000,000 mi)
2018-03-11	2008 EM_{68} (Note: 2008 EM_{68} has a cumulative probability of 1 in 3,100,000 (Palermo scale -6.04) of impacting Earth in 2018.)	10	0.11	3,400,000	1.198	-6.09	2.7 AU (400,000,000 km; 250,000,000 mi)	3.0 AU (450,000,000 km; 280,000,000 mi)
2018-03-21	2014 OY_{391}	22	0.97	2,000,000,000	3.436	-7.94	3.4 AU (510,000,000 km; 320,000,000 mi)	3.4 AU (510,000,000 km; 320,000,000 mi)
2018-03-22	2014 MV67	537	0.93	1,900,000,000	0.195	-4.68	3.8 AU (570,000,000 km; 350,000,000 mi)	2.4 AU (360,000,000 km; 220,000,000 mi)
2018-04-08	2014 HG_{196} (Note: 2014 HG_{196} has a cumulative probability of 1 in 268,000,000 (Palermo scale -7.64) of impacting Earth in 2018.)	16	1.0	1,900,000,000	0.196	-8.19	3.0 AU (450,000,000 km; 280,000,000 mi)	3.4 AU (510,000,000 km; 320,000,000 mi)
2018-04-10	2016 AZ_{193} (Note: 2016 AZ_{193} has a cumulative probability of 1 in 61,300,000 (Palermo scale -6.76) of impacting Earth in 2018.)	19	0.16	91,000,000	0.155	-6.86	0.63 AU (94,000,000 km; 59,000,000 mi)	0.60 AU (90,000,000 km; 56,000,000 mi)
2018-04-18	2008 US	2	0.081	240,000	0.253	-6.56	1.0 AU (150,000,000 km; 93,000,000 mi)	1.0 AU (150,000,000 km; 93,000,000 mi)
2018-04-19	N/A (not discovered before impact)	4	N/A	1	0.000	0	N/A (impact)	N/A (impact)
2018-04-24	2008 UY_{91}	36	0.12	310,000,000	0.687	-6.63	3.8 AU (570,000,000 km; 350,000,000 mi)	3.8 AU (570,000,000 km; 350,000,000 mi)
2018-04-29	2016 AZ_{193}	19	0.16	210,000,000	-0.099	-7.67	0.72 AU (108,000,000 km; 67,000,000 mi)	0.69 AU (103,000,000 km; 64,000,000 mi)
2018-04-30	2014 HD_{198}	4	0.97	710,000	-1.705	-6.18	3.7 AU (550,000,000 km; 340,000,000 mi)	3.7 AU (550,000,000 km; 340,000,000 mi)
2018-05-04	2008 LE	22	0.14	270,000,000	-0.137	-7.01	2.3 AU (340,000,000 km; 210,000,000 mi)	2.3 AU (340,000,000 km; 210,000,000 mi)
2018-05-08	2009 VZ_{39}	9	0.043	210,000,000	1.159	-7.45	1.9 AU (280,000,000 km; 180,000,000 mi)	3.0 AU (450,000,000 km; 280,000,000 mi)
2018-05-17	2008 VS_{4} (Note: 2008 VS_{4} has a cumulative probability of 1 in 339,000,000 (Palermo scale -6.54) of impacting Earth in 2018.)	49	0.083	480,000,000	1.108	-6.64	2.3 AU (340,000,000 km; 210,000,000 mi)	1.6 AU (240,000,000 km; 150,000,000 mi)
2018-06-02	2018 LA	3	0.16	1	0.000	>0	0.00004 AU (6,000 km; 3,700 mi) (impact)	0.00004 AU (6,000 km; 3,700 mi) (impact)
2018-06-03	2014 LY_{21} (Note: 2014 LY_{21} has a cumulative probability of 1 in 384,000 (Palermo scale -5.53) of impacting Earth in 2018.)	5	0.045	910,000	-0.349	-5.67	1.1 AU (160,000,000 km; 100,000,000 mi)	1.3 AU (190,000,000 km; 120,000,000 mi)
2018-06-03	2014 LY_{21}	5	0.045	670,000	0.067	-6.10	1.1 AU (160,000,000 km; 100,000,000 mi)	1.3 AU (190,000,000 km; 120,000,000 mi)
2018-06-04	2014 LY_{21}	5	0.045	340,000,000	0.474	-9.17	1.1 AU (160,000,000 km; 100,000,000 mi)	1.3 AU (190,000,000 km; 120,000,000 mi)
2018-06-21	N/A (not discovered before impact)	5	N/A	1	0.000	0	N/A (impact)	N/A (impact)
2018-06-22	2015 HV_{182}	157	1.0	500,000,000	-0.333	-5.62	1.9 AU (280,000,000 km; 180,000,000 mi)	1.9 AU (280,000,000 km; 180,000,000 mi)
2018-07-25	N/A (not discovered before impact)	3	N/A	1	0.000	0	N/A (impact)	N/A (impact)
2018-08-12	2014 HG_{196}	16	1.0	310,000,000	-0.816	-7.79	1.8 AU (270,000,000 km; 170,000,000 mi)	1.6 AU (240,000,000 km; 150,000,000 mi)
2018-08-19	2015 ME131	499	1.8	560,000,000	0.768	-4.13	1.3 AU (190,000,000 km; 120,000,000 mi)	1.3 AU (190,000,000 km; 120,000,000 mi)
2018-08-30	2008 EM_{68}	10	0.11	6,200,000,000	2.277	-9.63	2.8 AU (420,000,000 km; 260,000,000 mi)	3.2 AU (480,000,000 km; 300,000,000 mi)
2018-09-07	2008 EM_{68}	10	0.11	170,000,000	1.084	-7.95	2.7 AU (400,000,000 km; 250,000,000 mi)	3.1 AU (460,000,000 km; 290,000,000 mi)
2018-09-10	2008 EM_{68}	10	0.11	91,000,000	0.297	-7.56	2.7 AU (400,000,000 km; 250,000,000 mi)	3.1 AU (460,000,000 km; 290,000,000 mi)
2018-09-11	2008 EM_{68}	10	0.11	120,000,000	-0.315	-7.56	2.7 AU (400,000,000 km; 250,000,000 mi)	3.1 AU (460,000,000 km; 290,000,000 mi)
2018-09-11	2008 EM_{68}	10	0.11	710,000,000	-1.258	-8.14	2.7 AU (400,000,000 km; 250,000,000 mi)	3.1 AU (460,000,000 km; 290,000,000 mi)
2018-09-12	2008 EM_{68}	10	0.11	220,000,000	-0.824	-7.72	2.7 AU (400,000,000 km; 250,000,000 mi)	3.0 AU (450,000,000 km; 280,000,000 mi)
2018-09-12	2008 EM_{68}	10	0.11	7,700,000,000	-2.041	-8.91	2.7 AU (400,000,000 km; 250,000,000 mi)	3.0 AU (450,000,000 km; 280,000,000 mi)
2018-09-12	2008 EM_{68}	10	0.11	1,800,000,000	-1.660	-8.39	2.7 AU (400,000,000 km; 250,000,000 mi)	3.0 AU (450,000,000 km; 280,000,000 mi)
2018-09-13	2015 HW_{182}	31	1.0	1,400,000,000	-1.839	-7.55	1.3 AU (190,000,000 km; 120,000,000 mi)	1.4 AU (210,000,000 km; 130,000,000 mi)
2018-09-18	2015 HS_{182}	23	3.0	1,100,000,000	1.918	-7.98	3.0 AU (450,000,000 km; 280,000,000 mi)	3.0 AU (450,000,000 km; 280,000,000 mi)
2018-09-19	2015 HV_{182}	157	1.0	770,000,000	-0.337	-5.87	2.3 AU (340,000,000 km; 210,000,000 mi)	2.3 AU (340,000,000 km; 210,000,000 mi)
2018-09-20	2009 FZ_{4}	31	0.60	14,000,000	0.453	-5.77	1.3 AU (190,000,000 km; 120,000,000 mi)	0.62 AU (93,000,000 km; 58,000,000 mi)
2018-09-25	N/A (not discovered before impact)	4	N/A	1	0.000	0	N/A (impact)	N/A (impact)
2018-09-26	2015 HV_{182}	157	1.0	2,400,000,000	0.029	-6.09	2.4 AU (360,000,000 km; 220,000,000 mi)	2.4 AU (360,000,000 km; 220,000,000 mi)
2018-10-02	2016 JO_{38}	37	0.97	53,000,000	0.328	-6.08	3.9 AU (580,000,000 km; 360,000,000 mi)	1.6 AU (240,000,000 km; 150,000,000 mi)
2018-10-22	2008 UM_{1}	2	0.031	3,300,000,000	-0.299	-11.2	4.8 AU (720,000,000 km; 450,000,000 mi)	3.8 AU (570,000,000 km; 350,000,000 mi)
2018-10-27	2014 HR_{197} (Note: 2014 HR_{197} has a cumulative probability of 1 in 385,000,000 (Palermo scale -7.74) of impacting Earth in 2018.)	14	0.96	2,100,000,000	-1.613	-8.25	1.2 AU (180,000,000 km; 110,000,000 mi)	1.7 AU (250,000,000 km; 160,000,000 mi)
2018-10-28	2014 HR_{197}	14	0.96	500,000,000	-0.177	-7.92	1.2 AU (180,000,000 km; 110,000,000 mi)	1.7 AU (250,000,000 km; 160,000,000 mi)
2018-10-30	2014 HR_{197}	14	0.96	8,300,000,000	1.972	-9.43	1.2 AU (180,000,000 km; 110,000,000 mi)	1.7 AU (250,000,000 km; 160,000,000 mi)
2018-11-01	2008 VL	9	0.12	710,000,000	1.279	-8.27	4.5 AU (670,000,000 km; 420,000,000 mi)	4.5 AU (670,000,000 km; 420,000,000 mi)
2018-11-12	2009 VZ_{39}	9	0.043	77,000,000	-0.297	-7.79	0.29 AU (43,000,000 km; 27,000,000 mi)	3.7 AU (550,000,000 km; 340,000,000 mi)
2018-11-12	2009 VZ_{39}	9	0.043	770,000,000	-0.704	-8.26	0.29 AU (43,000,000 km; 27,000,000 mi)	3.7 AU (550,000,000 km; 340,000,000 mi)
2018-11-12	2010 VP_{139} (Note: 2010 VP_{139} has a cumulative probability of 1 in 54,000,000 (Palermo scale -8.24) of impacting earth in 2018.)	6	0.046	56,000,000	0.822	-8.27	0.44 AU (66,000,000 km; 41,000,000 mi)	0.43 AU (64,000,000 km; 40,000,000 mi)
2018-11-12	2009 VZ_{39}	9	0.043	32,000,000	0.008	-7.61	0.29 AU (43,000,000 km; 27,000,000 mi)	3.7 AU (550,000,000 km; 340,000,000 mi)
2018-11-12	2010 VP_{139}	6	0.046	1,900,000,000	2.113	-9.46	0.44 AU (66,000,000 km; 41,000,000 mi)	0.43 AU (64,000,000 km; 40,000,000 mi)
2018-11-16	2009 VZ_{39}	9	0.043	67,000,000	0.981	-7.60	0.28 AU (42,000,000 km; 26,000,000 mi)	3.7 AU (550,000,000 km; 340,000,000 mi)
2018-11-16	2008 VS_{4}	49	0.083	10,000,000,000	1.753	-7.73	3.4 AU (510,000,000 km; 320,000,000 mi)	0.19 AU (28,000,000 km; 18,000,000 mi)
2018-11-20	N/A (not discovered before impact)	3	N/A	1	0.000	0	N/A (impact)	N/A (impact)
2018-11-29	2008 VS_{4}	49	0.083	1,300,000,000	0.856	-7.42	3.4 AU (510,000,000 km; 320,000,000 mi)	0.22 AU (33,000,000 km; 20,000,000 mi)
2018-12-11	2010 XC	5	0.058	40,000,000	-0.250	-8.27	2.4 AU (360,000,000 km; 220,000,000 mi)	2.3 AU (340,000,000 km; 210,000,000 mi)
2018-12-13	2005 TM_{173} (Note: 2005 TM_{173} has a cumulative probability of 1 in 336,000,000 (Palermo scale -6.50) of impacting earth in 2018.)	51	1.9	2,000,000,000	0.455	-7.48	5.3 AU (790,000,000 km; 490,000,000 mi)	5.3 AU (790,000,000 km; 490,000,000 mi)
2018-12-14	2010 WW_{8}	18	0.066	710,000,000	1.218	-7.87	2.9 AU (430,000,000 km; 270,000,000 mi)	3.4 AU (510,000,000 km; 320,000,000 mi)
2018-12-14	2014 JT_{79} (Note: 2014 JT_{79} has a cumulative probability of 1 in 46,300,000 (Palermo scale -7.08) of impacting Earth in 2018.)	13	2.8	830,000,000	0.401	-7.75	3.1 AU (460,000,000 km; 290,000,000 mi)	3.0 AU (450,000,000 km; 280,000,000 mi)
2018-12-15	2005 TM_{173}	51	1.9	450,000,000	-0.856	-6.64	5.3 AU (790,000,000 km; 490,000,000 mi)	5.3 AU (790,000,000 km; 490,000,000 mi)
2018-12-16	2014 JT_{79}	13	2.8	230,000,000	0.147	-7.53	3.1 AU (460,000,000 km; 290,000,000 mi)	3.0 AU (450,000,000 km; 280,000,000 mi)
2018-12-17	2010 GZ60 (Note: 2010 GZ_{60} was ruled out as a potential impactor after another observation was found by NEOWISE, improving the orbit enough to determine that it is not a near-earth object)	? (2000)	1.4 (1.3)	N/A (91,000,000)	N/A (1.952)	N/A (-2.43)	6.9 AU (1.03×10^{9} km; 640,000,000 mi)	Not listed
2018-12-18	2014 JT_{79}	13	2.8	91,000,000	-0.252	-7.51	3.1 AU (460,000,000 km; 290,000,000 mi)	3.1 AU (460,000,000 km; 290,000,000 mi)
2018-12-18	2010 MY_{112}	231	1.4	1,000,000,000	-0.262	-5.14	3.4 AU (510,000,000 km; 320,000,000 mi)	2.2 AU (330,000,000 km; 200,000,000 mi)
2018-12-18	N/A (not discovered before impact)	12	N/A	1	0.000	0	N/A (impact)	N/A (impact)
2018-12-20	2005 TM_{173}	51	1.9	3,400,000,000	-1.991	-7.29	5.3 AU (790,000,000 km; 490,000,000 mi)	5.2 AU (780,000,000 km; 480,000,000 mi)
2018-12-22	2014 JT_{79}	13	2.8	200,000,000	-1.085	-8.38	3.1 AU (460,000,000 km; 290,000,000 mi)	3.1 AU (460,000,000 km; 290,000,000 mi)
2018-12-23	2013 YB	2	0.16	17,000,000	3.754	-9.06	2.3 AU (340,000,000 km; 210,000,000 mi)	2.3 AU (340,000,000 km; 210,000,000 mi)
2018-12-26	2008 EL_{68}	9	0.071	3,200,000,000	-0.855	-9.74	1.4 AU (210,000,000 km; 130,000,000 mi)	1.1 AU (160,000,000 km; 100,000,000 mi)
2018-12-29	2016 AZ_{193}	19	0.16	2,800,000,000	0.411	-8.06	1.4 AU (210,000,000 km; 130,000,000 mi)	1.4 AU (210,000,000 km; 130,000,000 mi)
2018-12-30	2016 AZ_{193}	19	0.16	6,200,000,000	0.502	-8.22	1.4 AU (210,000,000 km; 130,000,000 mi)	1.3 AU (190,000,000 km; 120,000,000 mi)

== See also ==
- List of asteroid close approaches to Earth
- List of asteroid close approaches to Earth in 2017
- List of asteroid close approaches to Earth in 2019
- List of bolides (asteroids and meteoroids that impacted Earth)
- Asteroid impact prediction
