= 2018 CN2 =

Very small asteroid

2018 CN_{2}
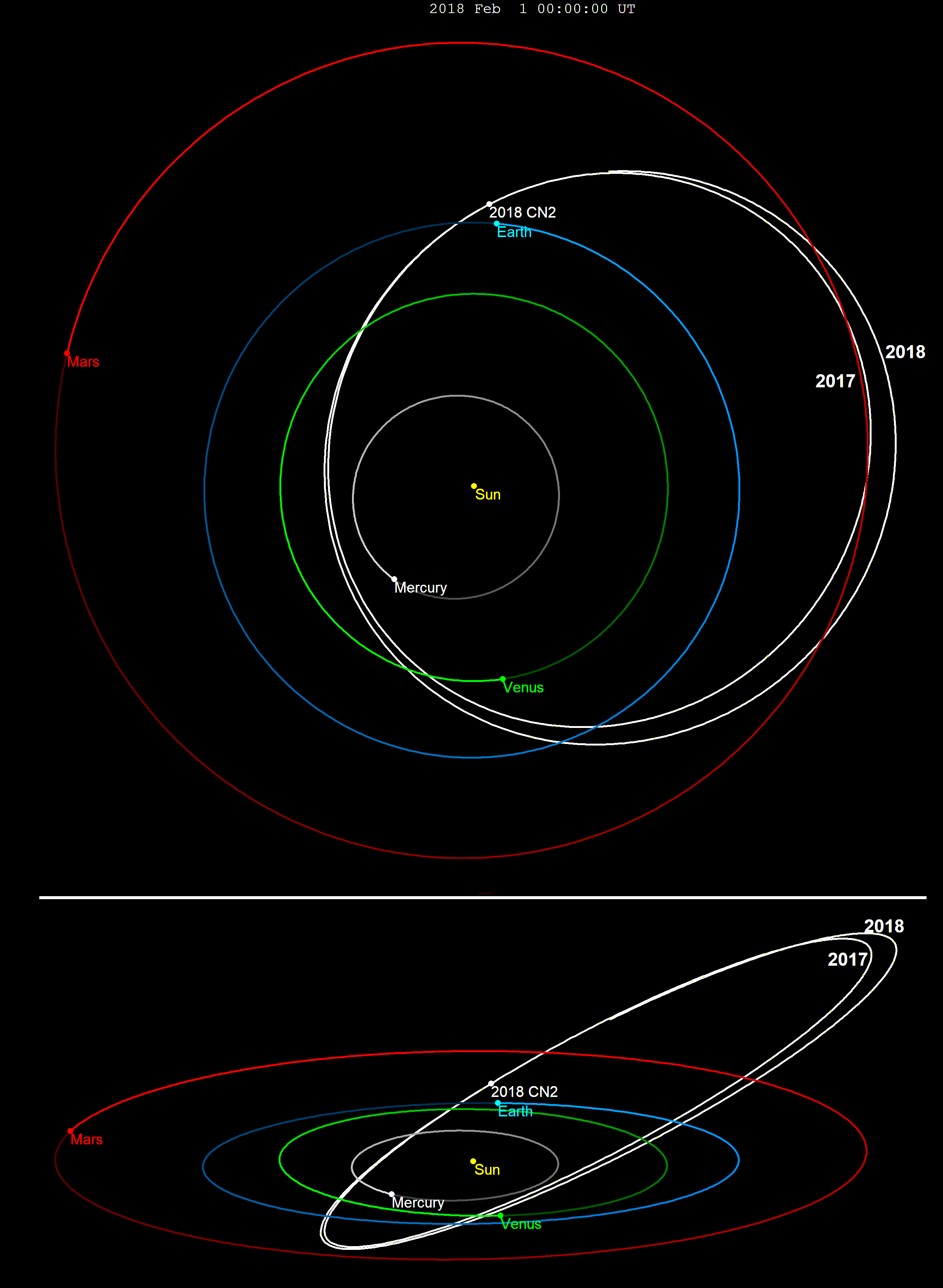
- The orbit before and after flyby, with positions on 1 February 2018, before flyby

Discovery
- Discovered by: Mount Lemmon Srvy.
- Discovery site: Mount Lemon Obs.
- Discovery date: 8 February 2018 (first observed only)

Designations
- Minor planet category: NEO · Apollo; Earth- and Mars crosser

Orbital characteristics
- Epoch 23 March 2018 (JD 2458200.5)
- Uncertainty parameter 7
- Observation arc: 1 day
- Aphelion: 1.7740 AU
- Perihelion: 0.6335 AU
- Semi-major axis: 1.2037 AU
- Eccentricity: 0.4738
- Orbital period (sidereal): 1.32 yr (482 days)
- Mean anomaly: 348.58°
- Mean motion: 0° 44^{m} 46.68^{s} / day
- Inclination: 25.741°
- Longitude of ascending node: 320.21°
- Argument of perihelion: 276.55°
- Earth MOID: 7.7×10^{−5} AU (0.03 LD)

Physical characteristics
- Mean diameter: 5–16 m 9 m (est. at 0.20); 17 m (est. at 0.057)
- Absolute magnitude (H): 27.653

2018 CN_{2} is a very small asteroid, classified as a near-Earth object of the Apollo group, approximately 5 to 16 meters in diameter. It was first observed by astronomers of the Mount Lemmon Survey at Mount Lemmon Observatory, Arizona, on 8 February 2018, one day prior its close encounter with Earth at 0.18 lunar distances.

== Orbit and classification ==
2018 CN_{2} is a member of the Apollo asteroids, which cross the orbit of Earth. Apollo's are the largest group of near-Earth objects with nearly 10 thousand known objects.

Based on a high orbital uncertainty, this asteroid orbits the Sun at a distance of 0.63–1.77 AU once every 16 months (482 days; semi-major axis of 1.20 AU). Its orbit has an eccentricity of 0.47 and an inclination of 26° with respect to the ecliptic. With an aphelion of 1.77 AU, it is also a Mars-crosser, as it crosses the orbit of the Red Planet at 1.666 AU. The body's observation arc begins at Mount Lemmon with its first observation on 8 February 2018.

=== Close encounters ===
The object has an exceptionally low minimum orbital intersection distance with Earth of 11,500 km (0.000077 AU), or 0.03 lunar distances (LD).

==== 2018 flyby ====
On 9 February 2018, 2018 CN_{2} passed at a nominal distance of only 69,900 km; 43,400 mi (0.000466964 AU) from Earth at 7:25 UTC. This corresponds to 0.18 LD. Based on the body's high orbital uncertainty, all subsequent close encounters in 2022, 2023, 2026, 2027 and 2031, are projected to occur at a distance of more than 15 million kilometers (0.1 AU; 39 LD).

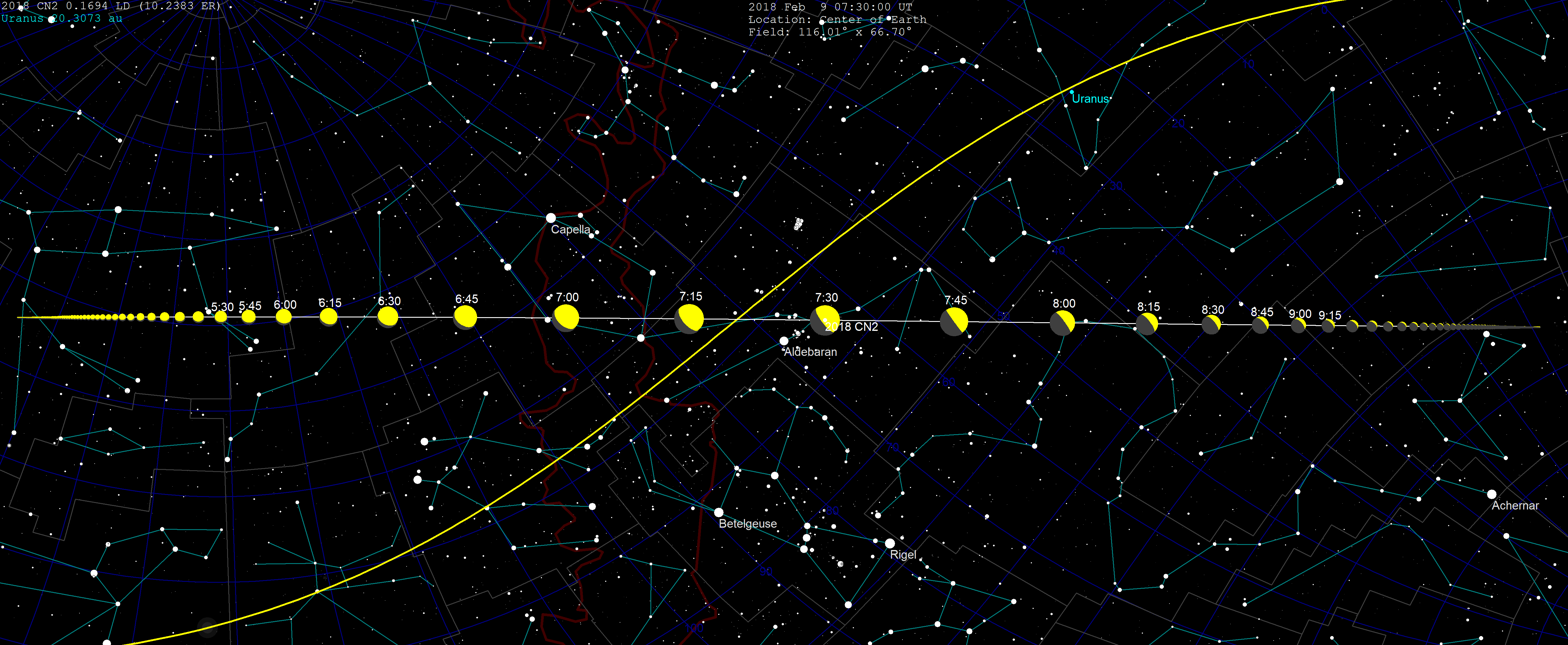
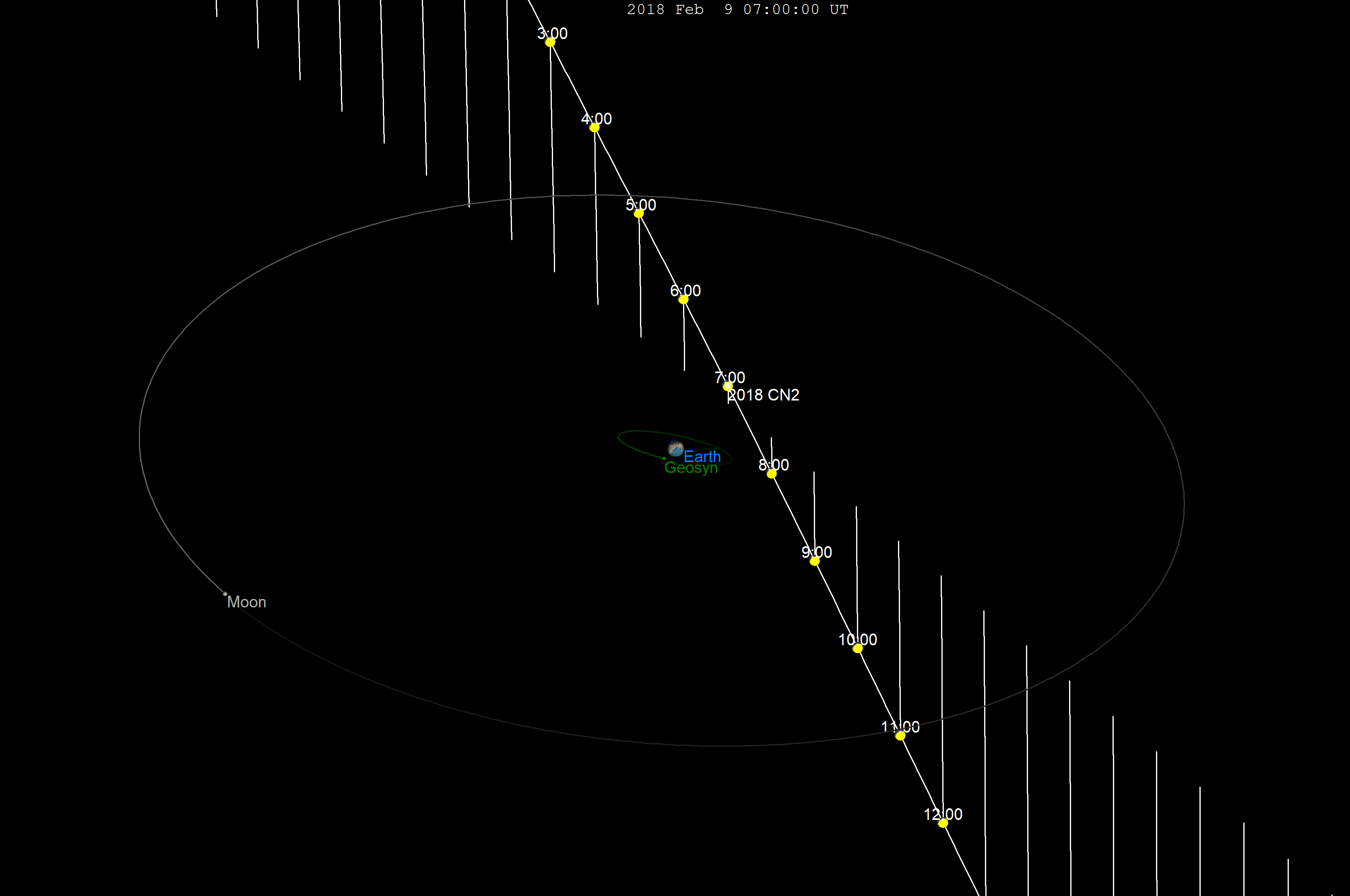
2018 flyby: Its path across the sky on 9 February was north to south (15 minute positions shown) (left). Seen from space, it passes just outside geosynchronous orbit (right).

== Physical characteristics ==
The Minor Planet Center estimates a diameter of 5–16 meters. Based on a generic magnitude-to-diameter conversion, 2018 CN_{2} measures between 9 and 17 meters in diameter, for an absolute magnitude of 27.653, and an assumed albedo between 0.057 and 0.20, which represent typical values for carbonaceous and stony asteroids, respectively.

As of 2018, no rotational lightcurve of 2018 CN_{2} has been obtained from photometric observations. The body's rotation period, pole and shape remain unknown.

== Numbering and naming ==
This minor planet has neither been numbered nor named.

== See also ==
- List of asteroid close approaches to Earth in 2018
