= 2018 WV1 =

Small near-Earth asteroid

2018 WV_{1}
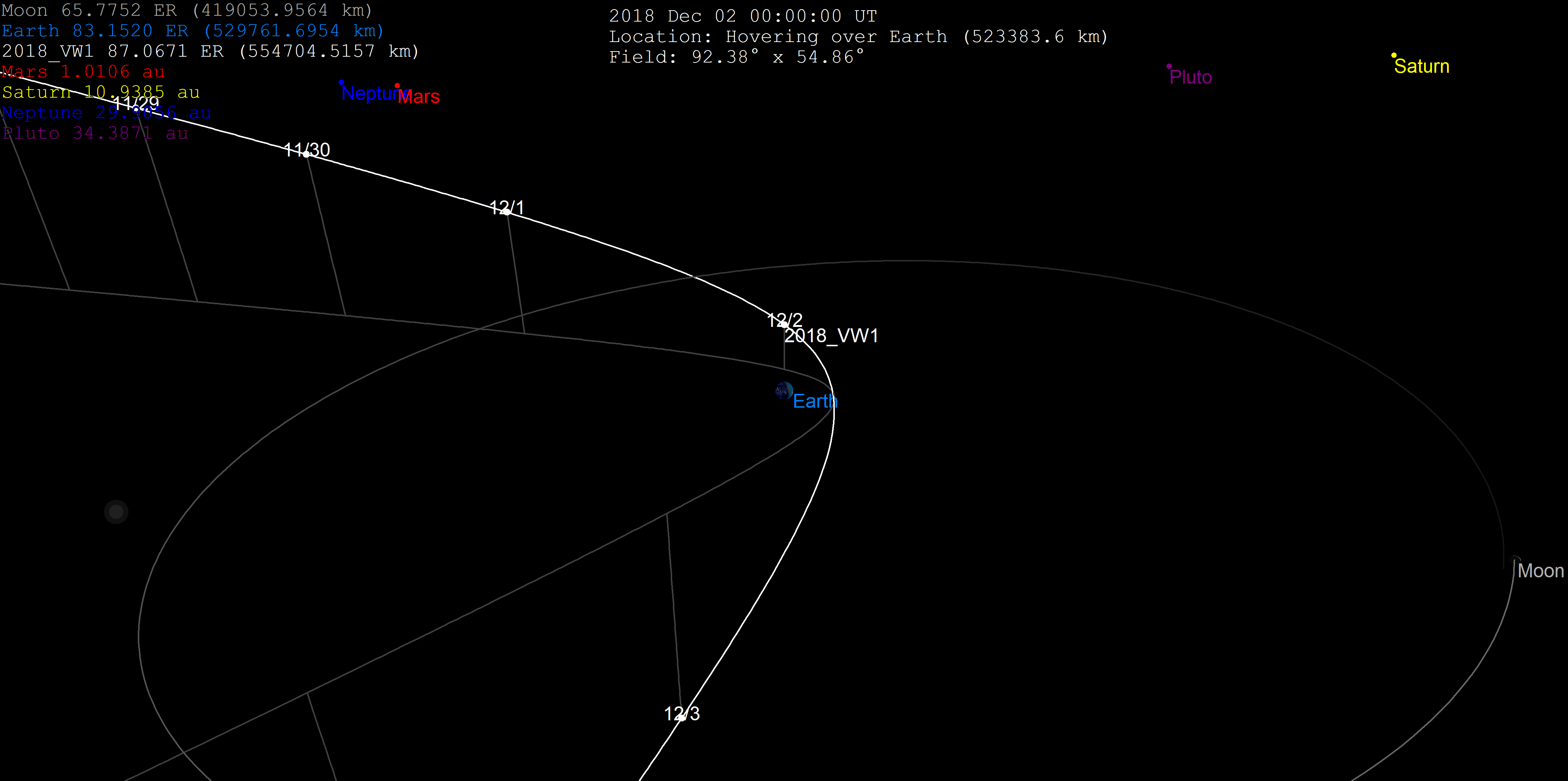
- 2018 WV_{1}'s flyby trajectory

Discovery
- Discovered by: CSS; H. Groeller
- Discovery site: Catalina Station
- Discovery date: 29 November 2018 (first observed only)

Designations
- Alternative designations: ZW0C3A5
- Minor planet category: NEO · Apollo; Earth crosser

Orbital characteristics
- Epoch 6 December 2018 (JD 2458458.5)
- Uncertainty parameter 2
- Observation arc: 14 days
- Aphelion: 1.1149 AU
- Perihelion: 0.9715 AU
- Semi-major axis: 1.0432 AU
- Eccentricity: 0.0686
- Orbital period (sidereal): 1.065 yr (389 d)
- Mean anomaly: 38.51°
- Mean motion: 0° 55^{m} 30^{s} / day
- Inclination: 1.9054°
- Longitude of ascending node: 248.51°
- Argument of perihelion: 141.37°
- Earth MOID: 0.1444 LD (55500 km)

Physical characteristics
- Mean diameter: 4 m (assumed)
- Absolute magnitude (H): 30.145; 30.183; 30.2

2018 WV_{1} is a very small asteroid and near-Earth object of the Apollo group that passed within 27,000 kilometers (17,000 miles) of the Earth's surface on 2 December 2018. It was first observed on 29 November 2018 by Hannes Gröller with the Catalina Sky Survey at Catalina Station on Mount Bigelow, Arizona, in the United States.

== Orbit ==
2018 WV_{1} orbits the Sun at a distance of 0.97–1.11 AU once every 389 days (semi-major axis of 1.04 AU). Its orbit has an eccentricity of 0.07 and an inclination of 2° with respect to the ecliptic.

As an Apollo asteroid with an orbital period slightly larger than that of the Earth, its orbit is very similar to that of the Earth, indicating that the object could potentially be a piece of lunar ejecta, a fragment of the Moon that was ejected into space when a larger asteroid hit the Moon a long time ago.

== 2018 flyby ==
On 2 December 2018, the asteroid passed about 33,000 km (21,000 mi) from Earth, traveling 5.2 kilometres per second (3.2 mi/s) relative to Earth and briefly reaching apparent magnitude 17. This was the third-closest approach by an asteroid in 2018, and the 70th asteroid of the year that passed within 1 lunar distance of Earth. Its absolute magnitude of 30.1 indicates a diameter between 2.5 and 5.6 metres.

2018 WV_{1} remained inside the Earth's sphere of influence from 27 November till 7 December 2018. During the flyby, its orbital period changed from 1.13 to 1.06 years.

At the time of its discovery, 2018 WV_{1} had a 2% chance to hit Earth in early December 2018. The possibility of impact was ruled out soon after, as more data became available.

== Other flybys ==
2018 WV_{1} passed within 0.38 AU (57,000,000 km) of Earth in December 2019.

The asteroid, when first discovered, was placed on the Sentry risk table. Further observations refined its orbit enough to remove it from the table on December 3, 2018

=== Flyby gallery ===
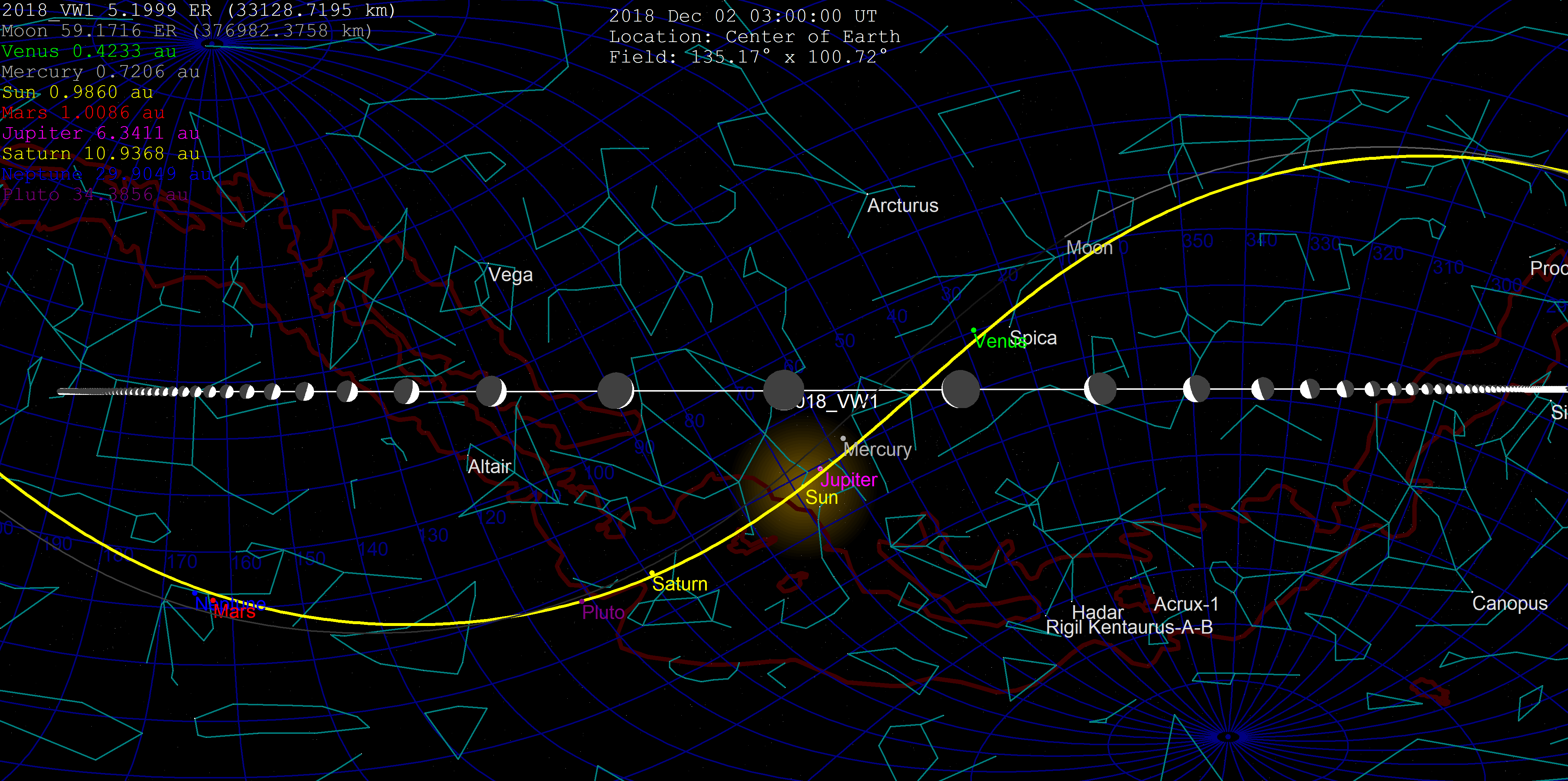
Its closest approach was between the Earth and Sun, so can't be observed.

Animation of 2018 WV1 orbit around Earth
Moon · Earth · 2018 WV1

Animation of 2018 WV1 orbit around Sun from 2017 to 2021
Sun · Earth · 2018 WV1

== See also ==
- List of asteroid close approaches to Earth
