= 2018 UA =

Near-Earth asteroid

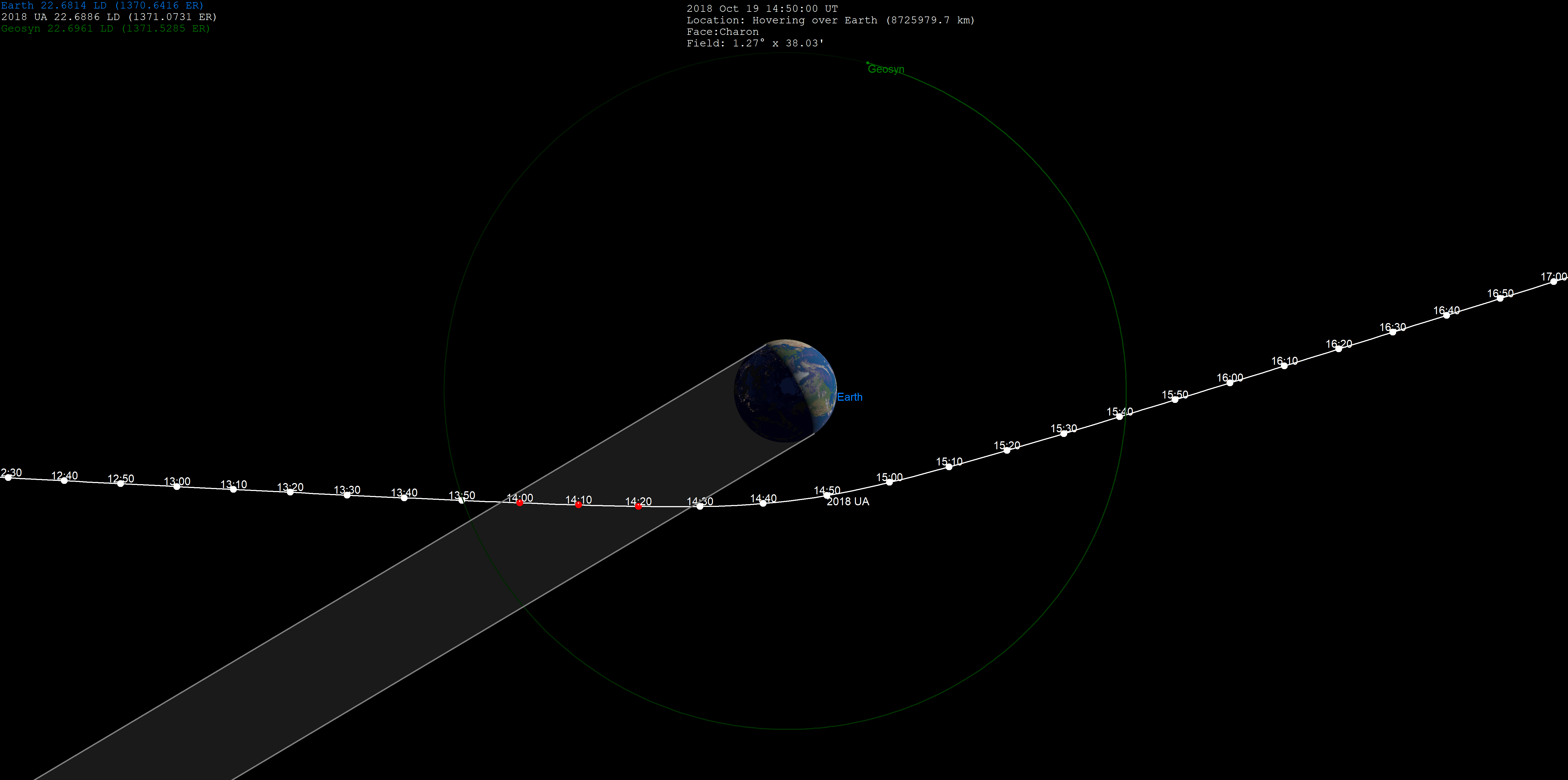
- The 10 minute motion of 2018 UA past the Earth on 19 October 2018

Discovery
- Discovery date: 19 October 2018

Orbital characteristics
- Aphelion: 2.010531 AU
- Perihelion: 0.768136 AU
- Semi-major axis: 1.38933 AU
- Eccentricity: 0.447119
- Orbital period (sidereal): 1.64 yr (598.15 d)
- Mean anomaly: 83.09092°
- Mean motion: 0° 36^{m} 6.69^{s} / day
- Inclination: 2.63971°
- Longitude of ascending node: 205.68400°
- Argument of perihelion: 255.21993°
- Earth MOID: 0.000186 AU

Physical characteristics
- Absolute magnitude (H): 30.158

2018 UA is a small near-Earth Apollo asteroid that flew very close to the Earth on 19 October 2018. It was discovered about 90 minutes before closest approach. After A106fgF, it was probably the second closest non-impacting approach of an asteroid in 2018.
