= 2018 CF2 =

Asteroid

2018 CF_{2}
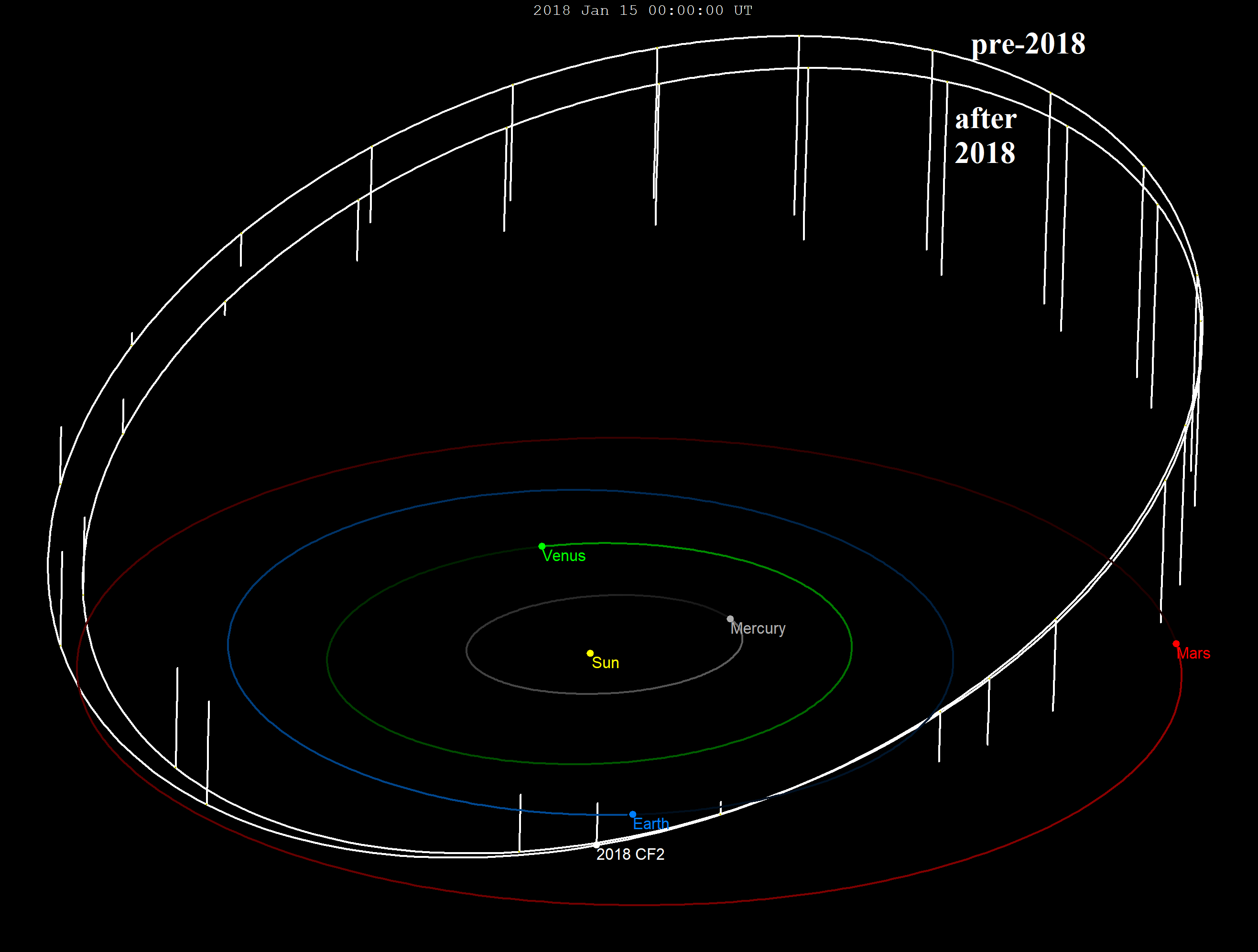
- The orbit before and after its 2018-flyby

Discovery
- Discovered by: MLS
- Discovery site: Mount Lemmon Obs.
- Discovery date: 7 February 2018

Designations
- Minor planet category: NEO · Apollo

Orbital characteristics
- Epoch 23 March 2018 (JD 2458200.5)
- Uncertainty parameter 7
- Observation arc: 2 days
- Aphelion: 2.7662 AU
- Perihelion: 0.9089 AU
- Semi-major axis: 1.8375 AU
- Eccentricity: 0.5054
- Orbital period (sidereal): 2.49 yr (910 days)
- Mean anomaly: 29.432°
- Mean motion: 0° 23^{m} 44.52^{s} / day
- Inclination: 16.284°
- Longitude of ascending node: 137.68°
- Argument of perihelion: 320.19°
- Earth MOID: 0.00077 AU (0.30 LD)

Physical characteristics
- Mean diameter: 4–15 m 7 m (est. at 0.20); 14 m (est. at 0.057)
- Absolute magnitude (H): 28.036

2018 CF_{2} is a micro-asteroid and near-Earth object of the Apollo group on an eccentric orbit with has an estimated 4–15 meters (10–50 ft). It was first observed on 7 February 2018, by astronomers of the Mount Lemmon Survey at Mount Lemmon Observatory, Arizona, United States. The discovery occurred the day after its sub-lunar passage as it approached the Earth from a sunward direction, and this flyby altered the asteroid's orbit slightly.

== Orbit and classification ==
2018 CF_{2} belongs to the Apollo asteroids, the largest group of near-Earth objects with nearly 10 thousand known members, which cross the orbit of Earth.

Based on a high uncertainty, it orbits the Sun at a distance of 0.91–2.77 AU once every 2 years and 6 months (910 days; semi-major axis of 1.84 AU). Its orbit has an eccentricity of 0.51 and an inclination of 16° with respect to the ecliptic. With an aphelion of 2.77 AU, it is also a Mars-crosser, as it crosses the orbit of the Red Planet at 1.666 AU. The body's observation arc begins at Mount Lemmon with its first observation on 7 February 2018.

=== 2018 flyby ===
On 6 February 2018, 18:45 UTC, the day before its first observation, it had a flyby with the Earth at a nominal distance of 0.25 lunar distances (LD). Its next close approach to Earth is projected to occur on 23 January 2023, at 0.111 AU (43 LD). After the 2018-passage, the body's minimum orbital intersection distance with Earth increased to 0.30 LD (0.00077 AU).

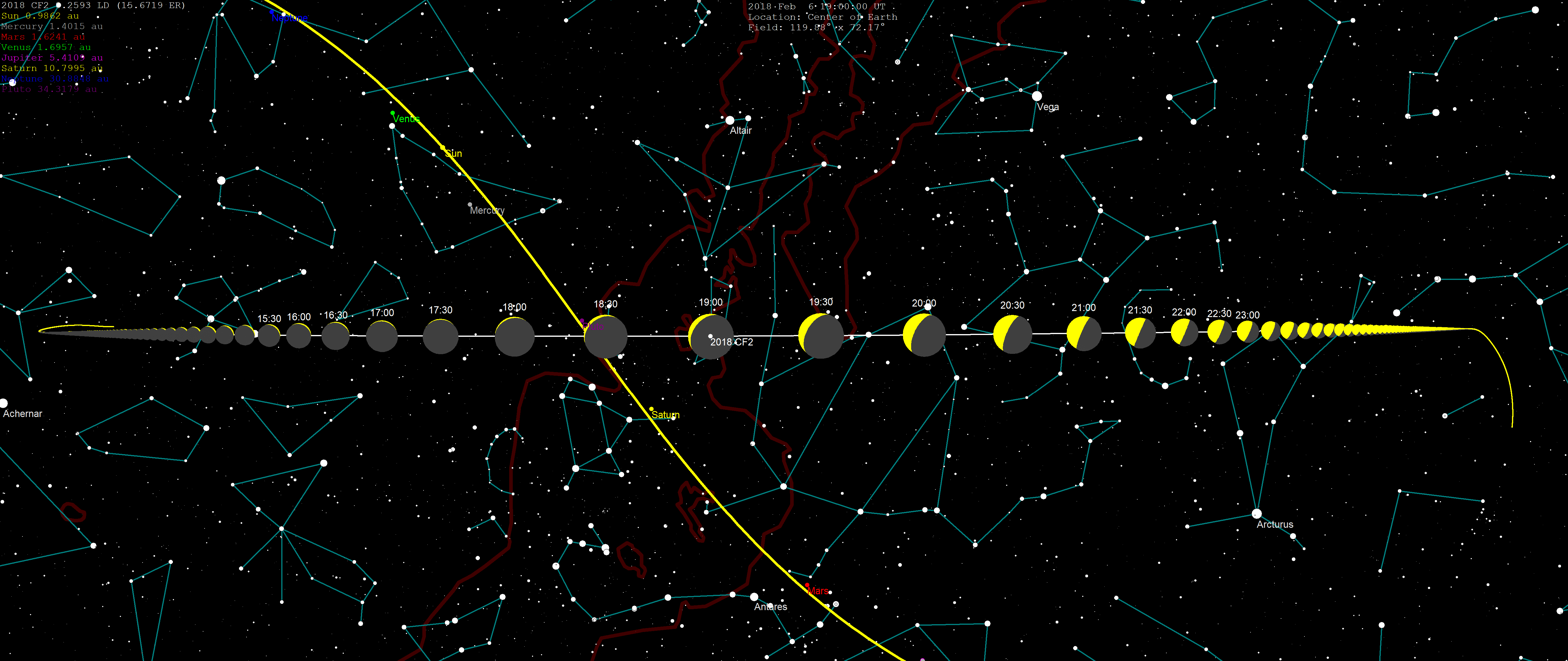
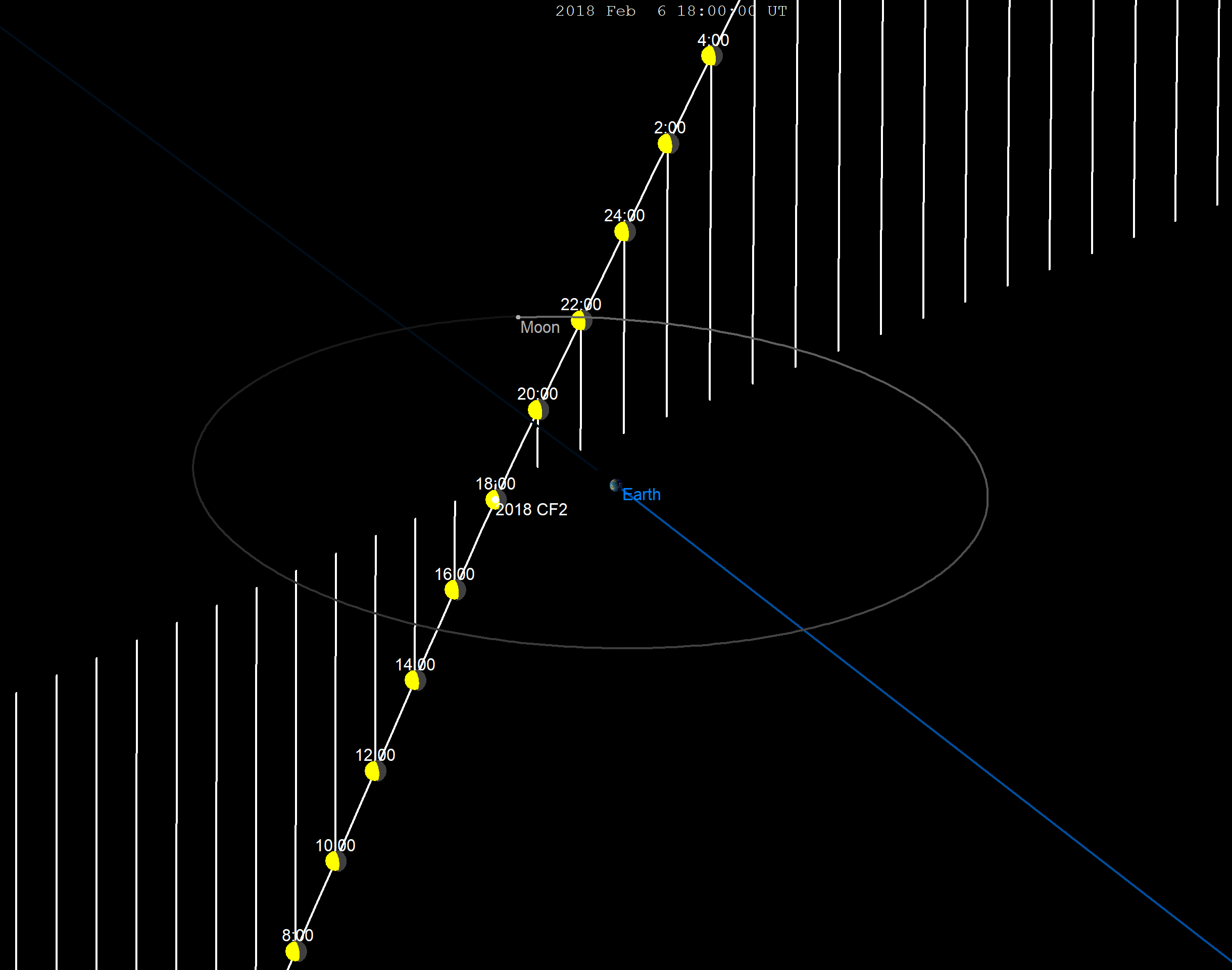
2018 flyby: Path in sky with daily motion south to north (left). View of path across earth-moon system, moving from south to north (right).

== Physical characteristics ==
The Minor Planet Center estimates a diameter of 4–15 meters (10–50 ft). Based on a generic magnitude-to-diameter conversion using an absolute magnitude of 28.036, the body measures between 7 and 14 meters in diameter for an assumed albedo of 0.057 and 0.20, which represent typical values for carbonaceous and stony asteroids, respectively.

As of 2018, no rotational lightcurve of 2018 CF_{2} has been obtained from photometric observations. The body's rotation period, pole and shape remain unknown.

== Numbering and naming ==
This minor planet has not yet been numbered.

== See also ==
- List of asteroid close approaches to Earth in 2018
- Gravity assist
