= 2018 PD20 =

Near-Earth micro-asteroid

2018 PD_{20}
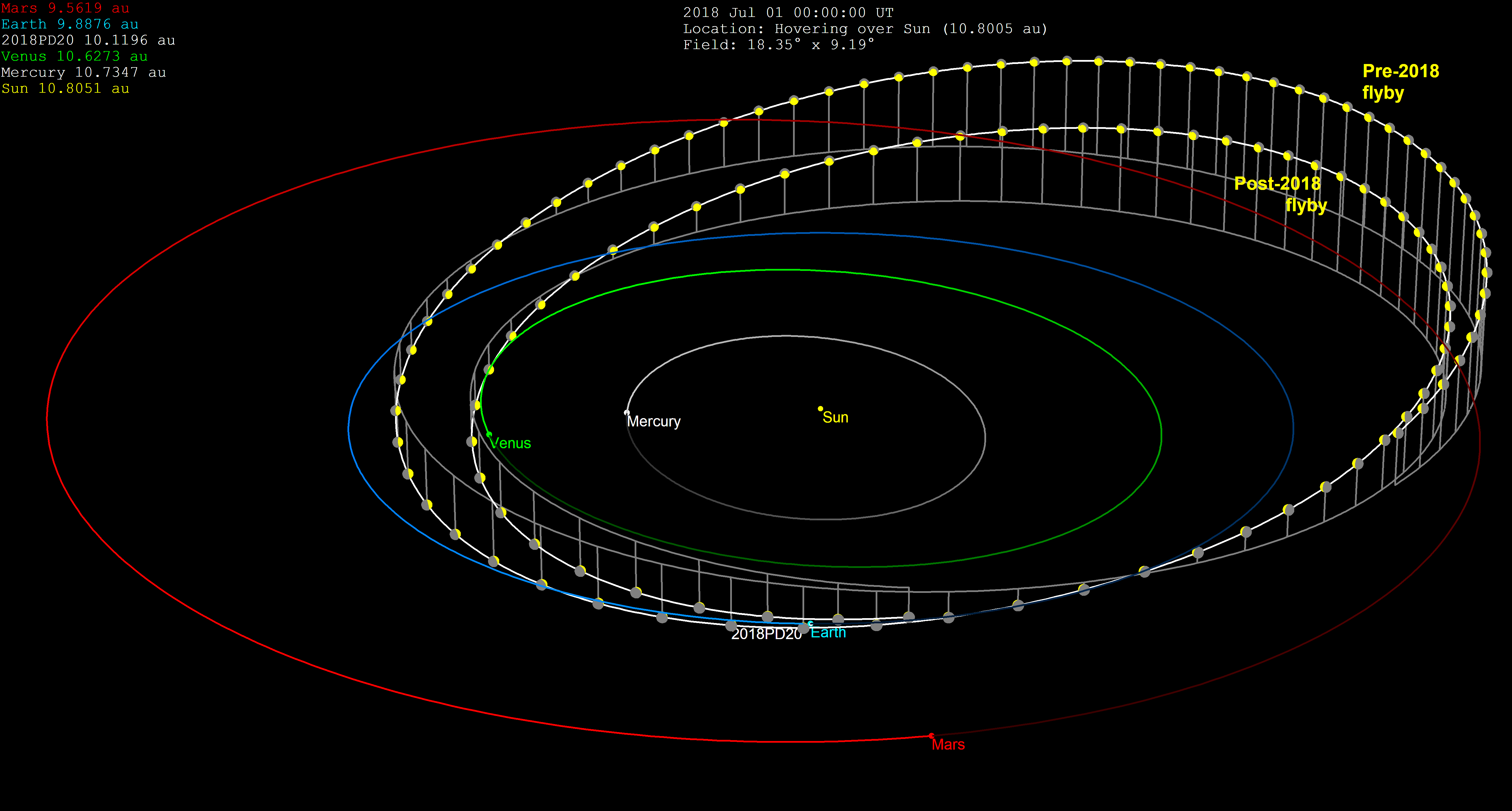
- Orbit and positions of 2018 PD_{20}

Discovery
- Discovered by: ATLAS-MLO
- Discovery site: Mauna Loa Obs. (first observed only)
- Discovery date: 11 August 2018

Designations
- Alternative designations: A107ZJi
- Minor planet category: NEO · Apollo

Orbital characteristics
- Epoch 23 March 2018 (JD 2458200.5)
- Uncertainty parameter 7 · 6
- Observation arc: 1 day
- Aphelion: 1.6604 AU
- Perihelion: 0.8163 AU
- Semi-major axis: 1.2383 AU
- Eccentricity: 0.3408
- Orbital period (sidereal): 1.38 yr (503 d)
- Mean anomaly: 300.72°
- Mean motion: 0° 42^{m} 54.72^{s} / day
- Inclination: 9.4808°
- Longitude of ascending node: 317.68°
- Argument of perihelion: 283.56°
- Earth MOID: 0.000182 AU (0.0708 LD); 27191 km

Physical characteristics
- Mean diameter: 9 m (est. at 0.24); 20 m (est. at 0.05)
- Absolute magnitude (H): 27.38; 27.4

2018 PD_{20} is a small asteroid, classified as a near-Earth object of the Apollo group, approximately 9–20 meters (30–66 feet) in diameter. On 11 August 2018, it was first observed by ATLAS at the Mauna Loa Observatory on Hawaii (T08), when it passed 33,500 kilometers (20,800 miles) from the Earth. This is notable because it came within a tenth of the lunar distance, or 0.10 LD which is closer to Earth than satellites in a geostationary orbit. These have an altitude of 0.11 LD, about 36,000 km (22,000 mi), approximately 3 times the width of the Earth.

== Orbit and classification ==
2018 PD_{20} orbits the Sun at a distance of 0.82–1.66 AU once every 17 months (503 days; semi-major axis of 1.24 AU). Its orbit has an eccentricity of 0.34 and an inclination of 9° with respect to the ecliptic.

The asteroid has an Earth minimum orbital intersection distance of 0.000181761 AU (27,191 km), which translates into 0.078 lunar distances.

== See also ==
- List of asteroid close approaches to Earth in 2018
