= 2018 BF3 =

Micro-asteroid

2018 BF_{3}
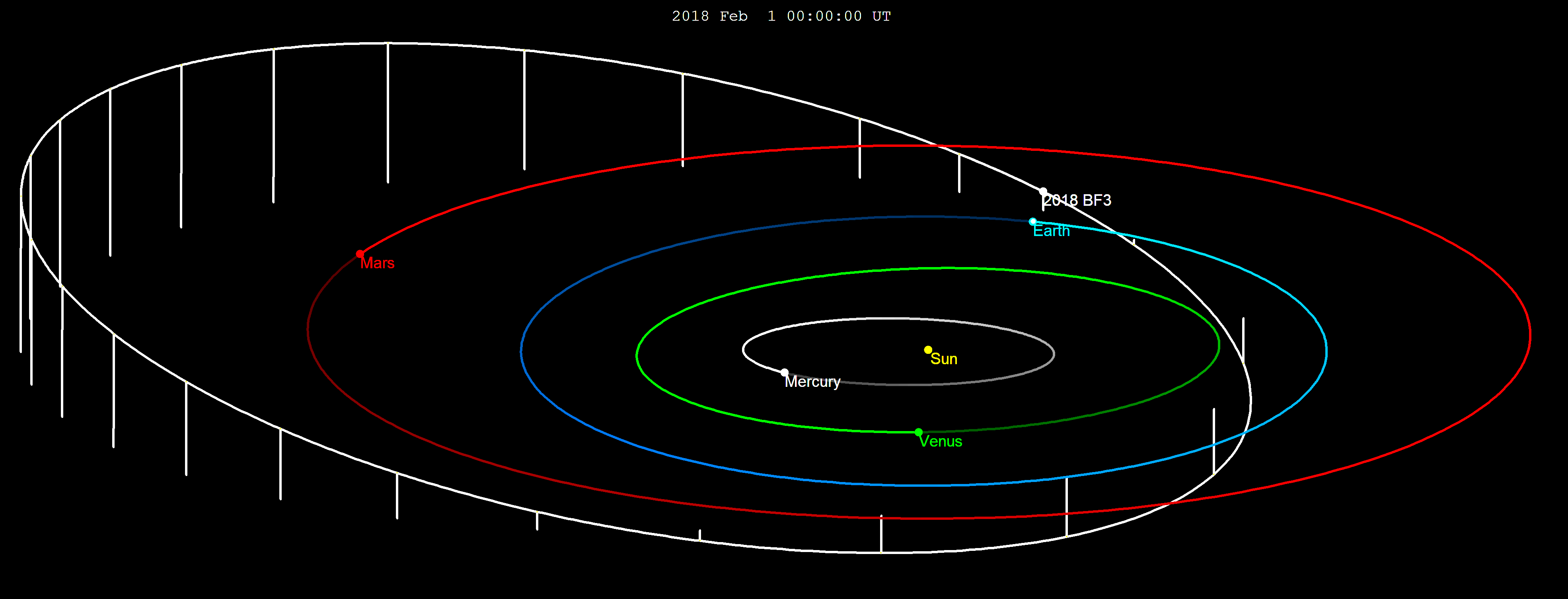
- Orbit and 1 Feb 2018 positions after flyby

Discovery
- Discovered by: CSS
- Discovery site: Mount Lemmon Obs.
- Discovery date: 20 January 2018

Designations
- Minor planet category: NEO · Apollo

Orbital characteristics
- Epoch 23 March 2018 (JD 2458200.5)
- Uncertainty parameter 7
- Observation arc: 3 days
- Aphelion: 2.2905 AU
- Perihelion: 0.8127 AU
- Semi-major axis: 1.5516 AU
- Eccentricity: 0.4762
- Orbital period (sidereal): 1.93 yr (706 days)
- Mean anomaly: 54.414°
- Mean motion: 0° 30^{m} 36^{s} / day
- Inclination: 11.691°
- Longitude of ascending node: 298.99°
- Argument of perihelion: 117.22°
- Earth MOID: 3.87715×10^{−5} AU (0.15 LD)

Physical characteristics
- Mean diameter: 12–38 m 18–40 m
- Absolute magnitude (H): 25.908

2018 BF_{3} is a micro-asteroid, classified as a near-Earth object of the Apollo group, approximately 20 meters (70 ft) in diameter. It was first observed on 20 January 2018, by astronomers of the Catalina Sky Survey at Mount Lemmon Observatory in Arizona, United States, the day after the closest flyby, due to its approach from the direction of the Sun.

== Description ==
2018 BF_{3} orbits the Sun at a distance of 0.8–2.3 AU once every 23 months (706 days; semi-major axis of 1.55 AU). Its orbit has an eccentricity of 0.48 and an inclination of 12° with respect to the ecliptic. With an aphelion of 2.3 AU, it is a Mars-crosser, crossing the orbit of the Red Planet at 1.666 AU. It is also an Earth-crosser, as are all Apollo asteroids. The body's observation arc begins at Mount Lemmon with its first observation on 20 February 2018.

=== 2018 flyby ===
On 19 January 2018, the object passed at a nominal distance of only 0.00162 AU; 150,000 mi (242,000 km) from Earth. This corresponds to 0.63 LD. Close approaches are projected for 28 October 2019 and 26 August 2021, both at a much larger distance (0.24 AU).

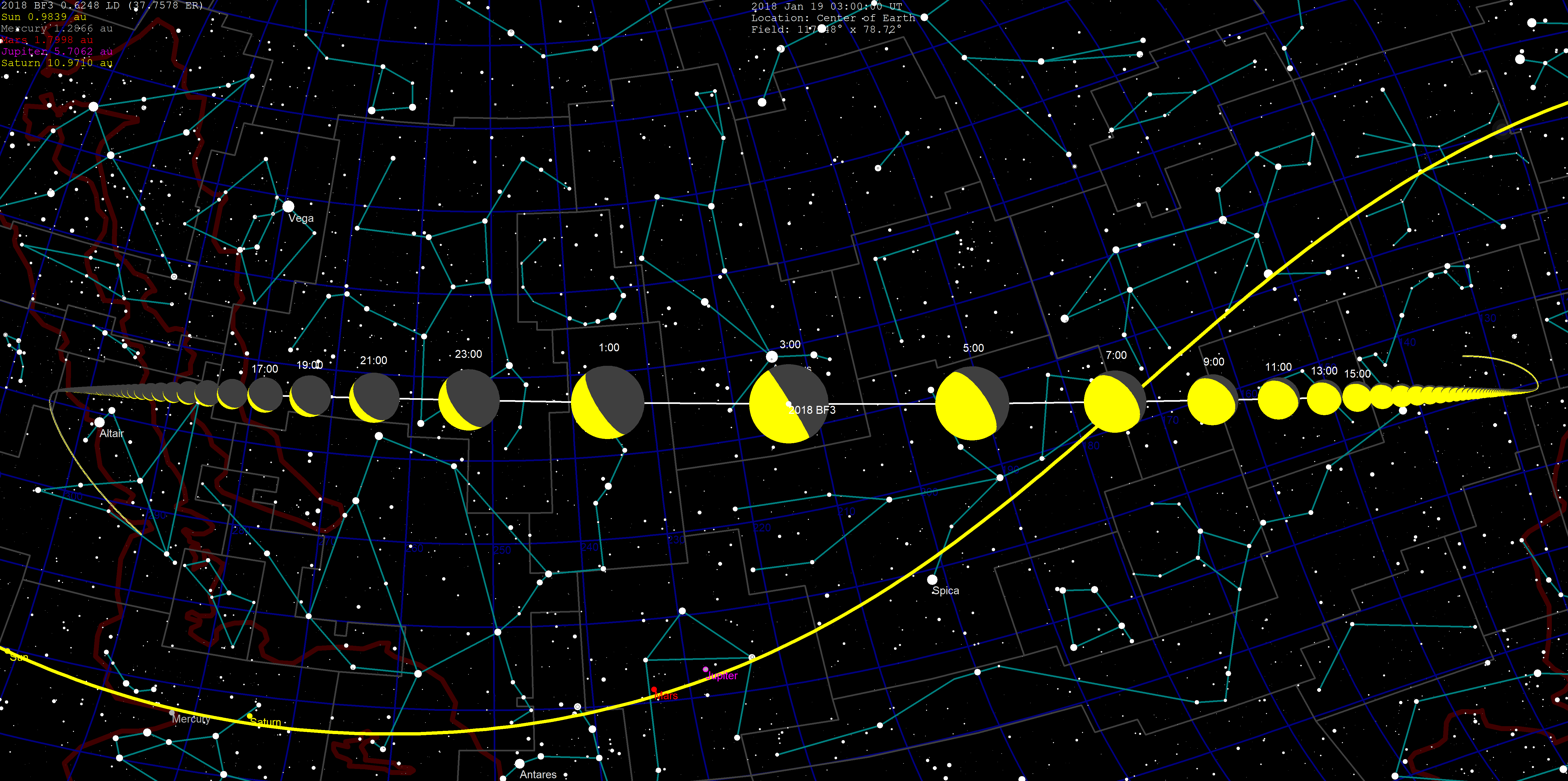
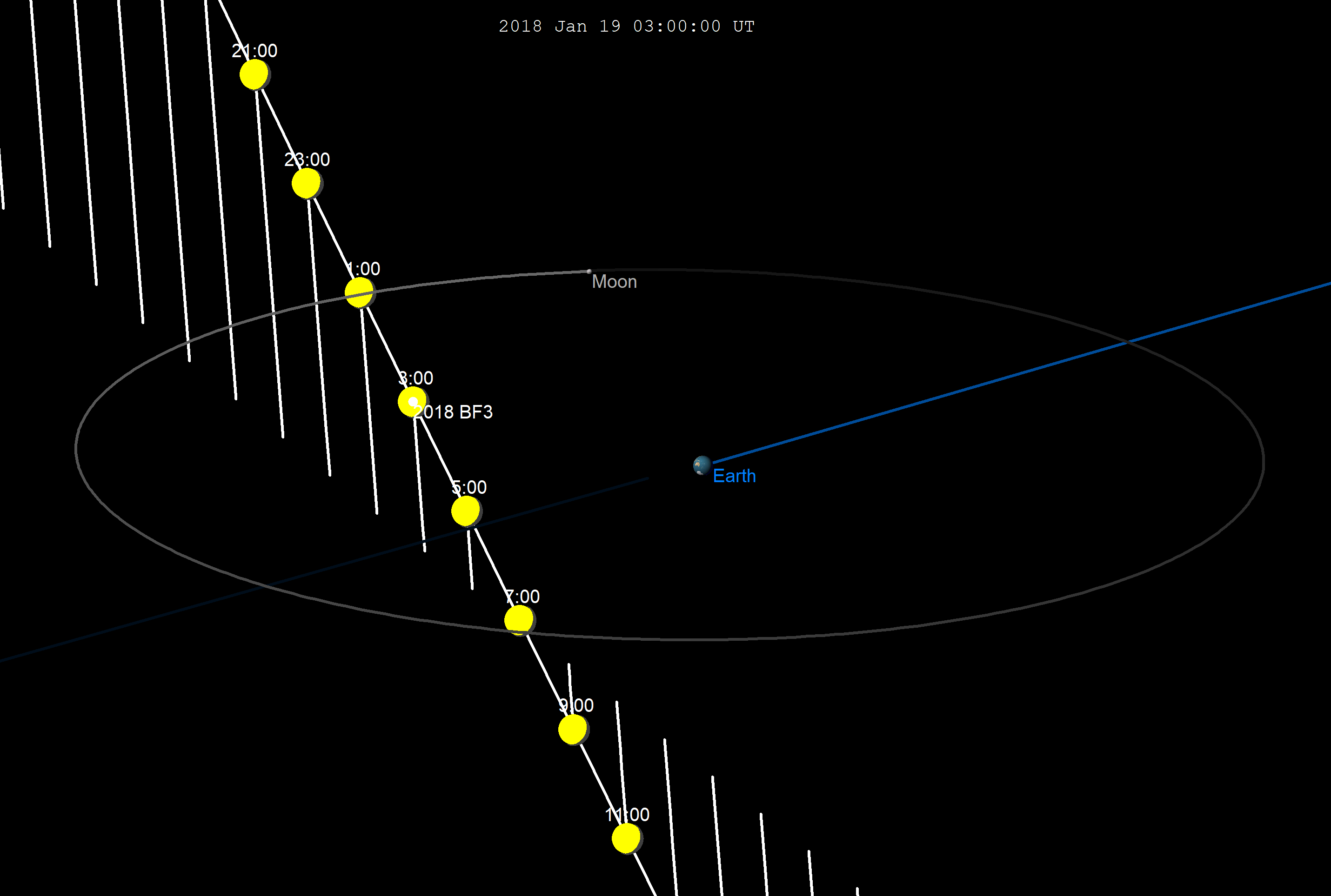
2018 flyby: Its path across the sky on 19 January was east to west (2 hour positions shown) (left). Seen from space, it passes just outside geosynchronous orbit (right).

=== Physical characteristics ===
The Minor Planet Center estimates a diameter of 12–38 meters (39–120 ft), concurring with other estimates of 18–40 meters (59–130 ft). As of 2018, no rotational lightcurve of this object has been obtained from photometric observations. The asteroids's rotation period, pole and shape remain unknown.

=== Numbering and naming ===
This minor planet has not yet been numbered.

== See also ==
- List of asteroid close approaches to Earth in 2018
