= 2018 BD =

Near-Earth asteroid

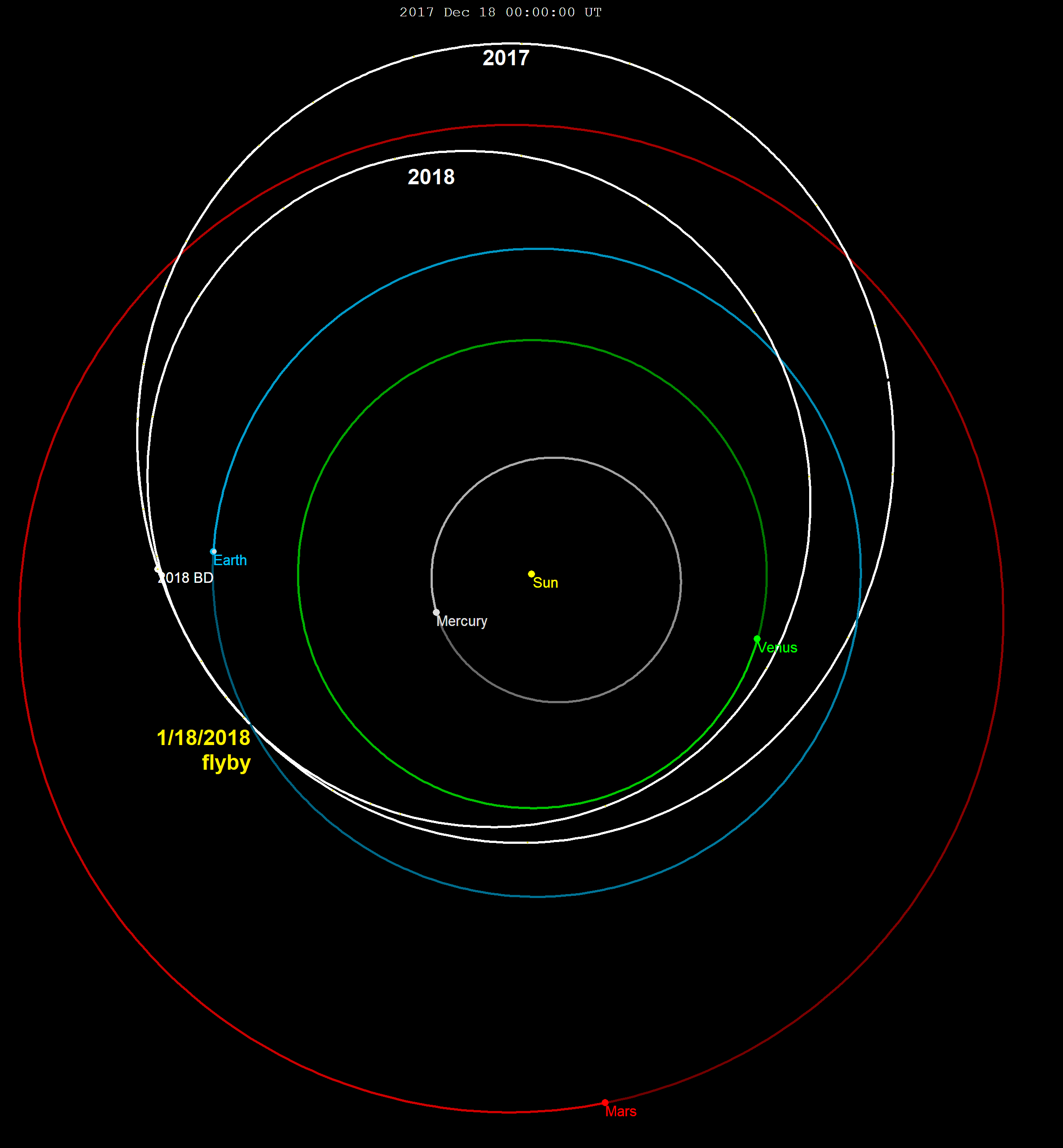
- Orbit before and after 1/18/2018 flyby

Discovery
- Discovered by: CSS
- Discovery site: Mount Lemmon Obs.
- Discovery date: 18 January 2018 (first observed only)

Designations
- Minor planet category: NEO · Apollo

Orbital characteristics
- Epoch 23 March 2018 (JD 2458200.5)
- Uncertainty parameter 7
- Observation arc: 1 day
- Aphelion: 1.3555 AU
- Perihelion: 0.7508 AU
- Semi-major axis: 1.0531 AU
- Eccentricity: 0.2871
- Orbital period (sidereal): 1.08 yr (395 days)
- Mean anomaly: 357.05°
- Mean motion: 0° 54^{m} 43.2^{s} / day
- Inclination: 2.4082°
- Longitude of ascending node: 298.10°
- Argument of perihelion: 273.70°
- Earth MOID: 6.019×10^{−6} AU (0.00234 LD)

Physical characteristics
- Mean diameter: 2 m (est. at 0.35); 6 m (est. at 0.05)
- Absolute magnitude (H): 30.154

2018 BD is a small asteroid and near-Earth object of the Apollo group, approximately 2–6 meters (7–20 ft) in diameter. It was first observed on 18 January 2018, by astronomers of the Catalina Sky Survey at Mount Lemmon Observatory, Arizona, United States, just hours before passing about 0.10 lunar distances from the Earth.

== Orbit and classification ==
2018 BD is an Apollo asteroid. It orbits the Sun at a distance of 0.75–1.36 AU once every 13 months (395 days; semi-major axis of 1.05 AU). Its orbit has an eccentricity of 0.29 and an inclination of 2° with respect to the ecliptic.

The object has an exceptionally low minimum orbital intersection distance with Earth of 900 km; 560 mi (0.000006019 AU), or 0.002 lunar distances.

=== 2018 approach ===
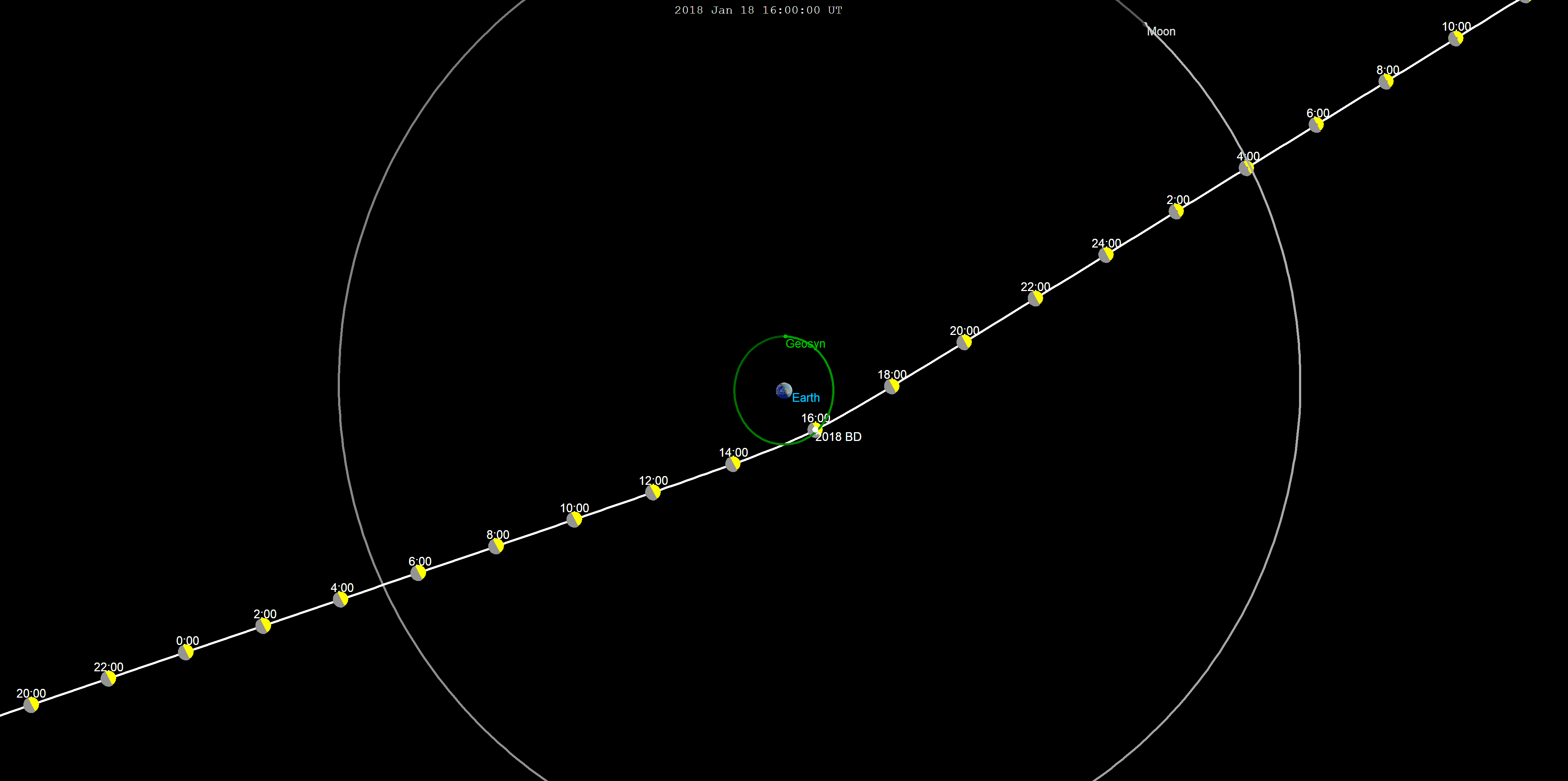
2018 BD passing near geosynchronous orbit

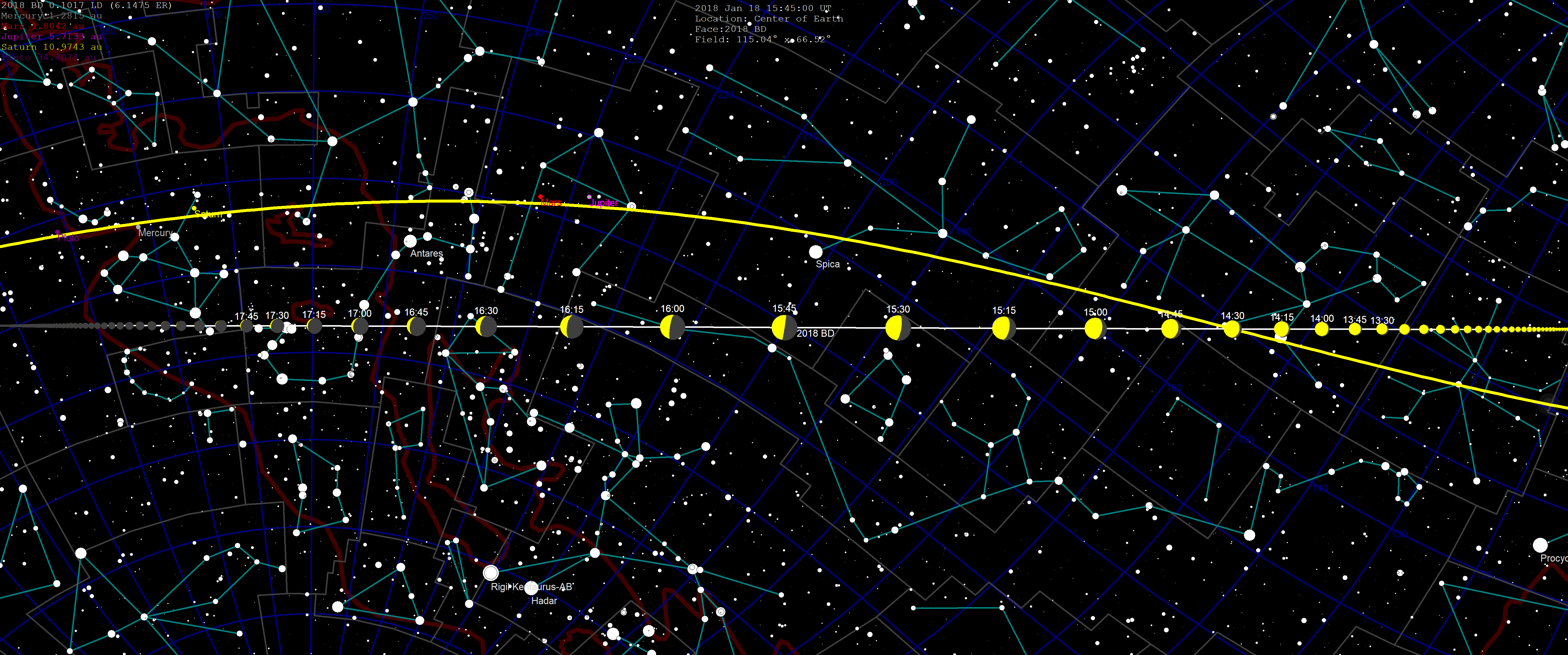
The object's motion across the sky in 15 minutes intervals west to east

== Physical characteristics ==
Based on a generic magnitude-to-diameter conversion, 2018 BD measures between 2 and 6 meters in diameter, for an absolute magnitude of 30.154, and an assumed albedo between 0.05 and 0.20, which represent typical values for carbonaceous and a bright E-type asteroids, respectively. As of 2018, no rotational light curve of this object has been obtained from photometric observations. The body's rotation period, pole and shape remain unknown.

== Numbering and naming ==
This minor planet has neither been numbered nor named.

== See also ==
- List of asteroid close approaches to Earth in 2018
