= 2018 CC =

Micro-asteroid

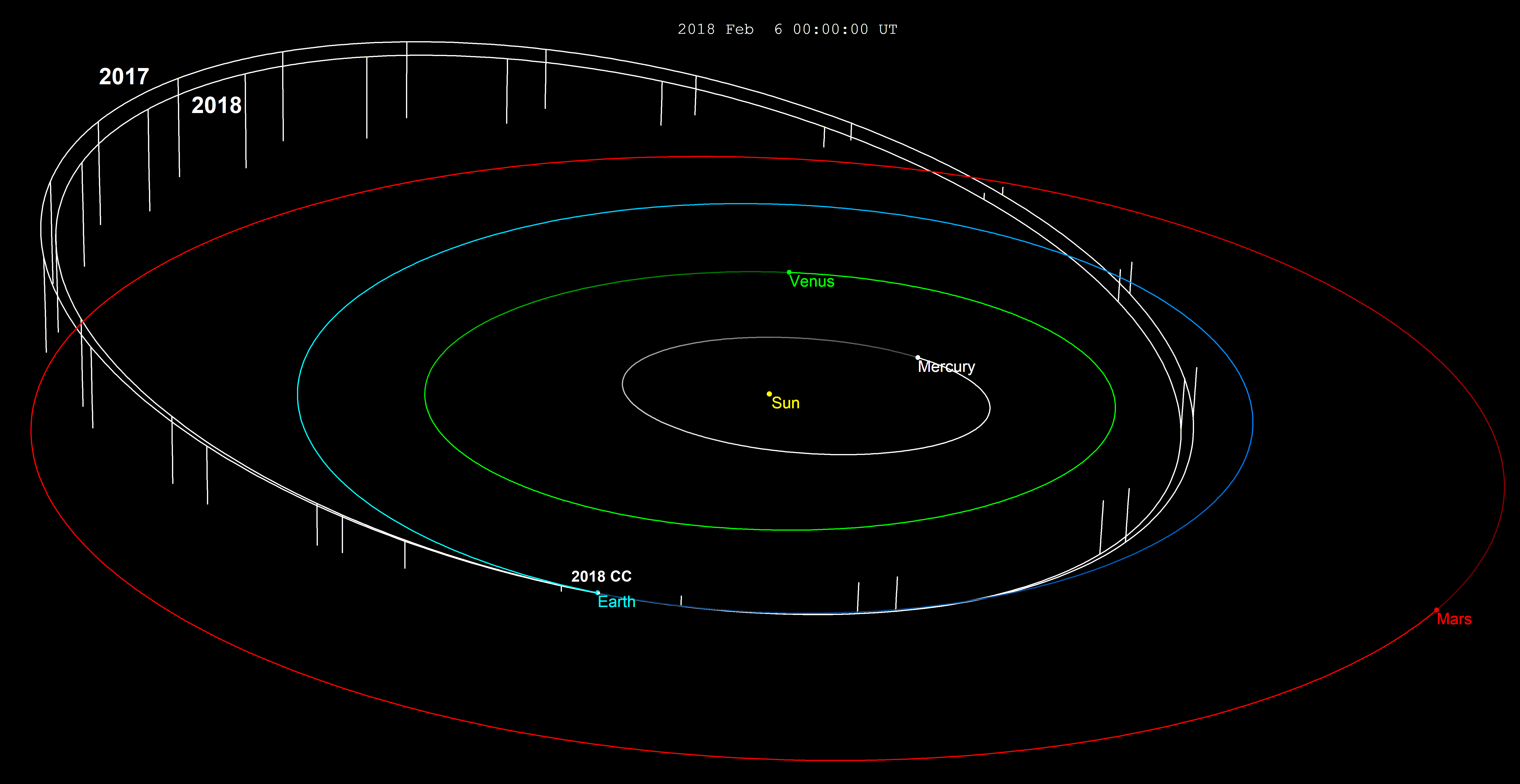
- Orbit of 2018 CC

Discovery
- Discovered by: Catalina Sky Srvy.
- Discovery site: Mount Lemmon Obs.
- Discovery date: 4 February 2018 (first observed only)

Designations
- Minor planet category: NEO · Apollo

Orbital characteristics
- Epoch 23 March 2018 (JD 2458200.5)
- Uncertainty parameter 6 · 5
- Observation arc: 17 days
- Aphelion: 1.7323 AU
- Perihelion: 0.8358 AU
- Semi-major axis: 1.2841 AU
- Eccentricity: 0.3491
- Orbital period (sidereal): 1.46 yr (531 days)
- Mean anomaly: 356.51°
- Mean motion: 0° 40^{m} 38.64^{s} / day
- Inclination: 8.4577°
- Longitude of ascending node: 317.50°
- Argument of perihelion: 245.91°
- Earth MOID: 0.0002 AU (0.078 LD)

Physical characteristics
- Mean diameter: 15 m (est. at 0.20); 40 m (est. at 0.057)
- Absolute magnitude (H): 26.541

2018 CC is a micro-asteroid, classified as a near-Earth object of the Apollo group, approximately 20 meters (70 ft) in diameter. Its official first observation was made by the Catalina Sky Survey at Mount Lemmon Observatory, Arizona, United States, on 4 February 2018. Two days later, the asteroid crossed the orbit of the Moon and made a very close approach to Earth.

== Orbit and classification ==
2018 CC belongs to the Apollo asteroids, which cross the orbit of Earth. Apollo's are the largest group of near-Earth objects with nearly 10 thousand known members. It orbits the Sun at a distance of 0.84–1.73 AU once every 18 months (531 days; semi-major axis of 1.28 AU). Its orbit has an eccentricity of 0.35 and an inclination of 8° with respect to the ecliptic. With an aphelion of 1.73 AU, it is also a Mars-crosser, as it crosses the orbit of the Red Planet at 1.66 AU.

The body's observation arc begins with its first recorded observation by Pan-STARRS on 20 January 2018.

=== Close approaches ===
The object has a low minimum orbital intersection distance with Earth of 29,900 km (0.0002 AU), which corresponds to 0.078 lunar distances (LD). On 8 February 2034, it will approach Earth to a distance of 0.0212 AU (3,170,000 km; 1,970,000 mi) or 8.2 LD.

==== 2018 flyby ====
On 6 February 2018, it passed at a nominal distance of 0.0012640 AU (189,000 km; 117,000 mi) from Earth (0.49 LD). One hour earlier, it passed the Moon at 577,000 km (0.0038564 AU).

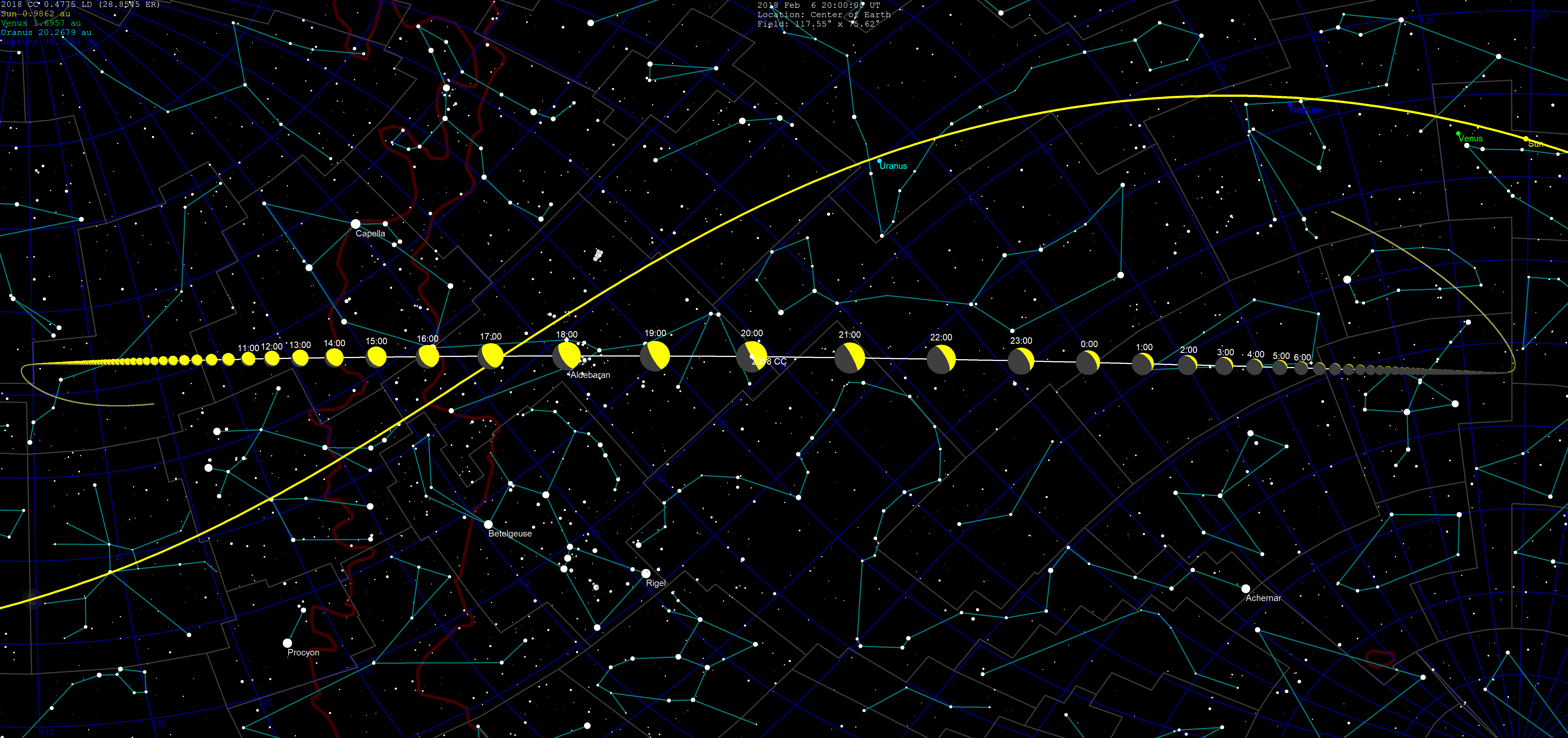
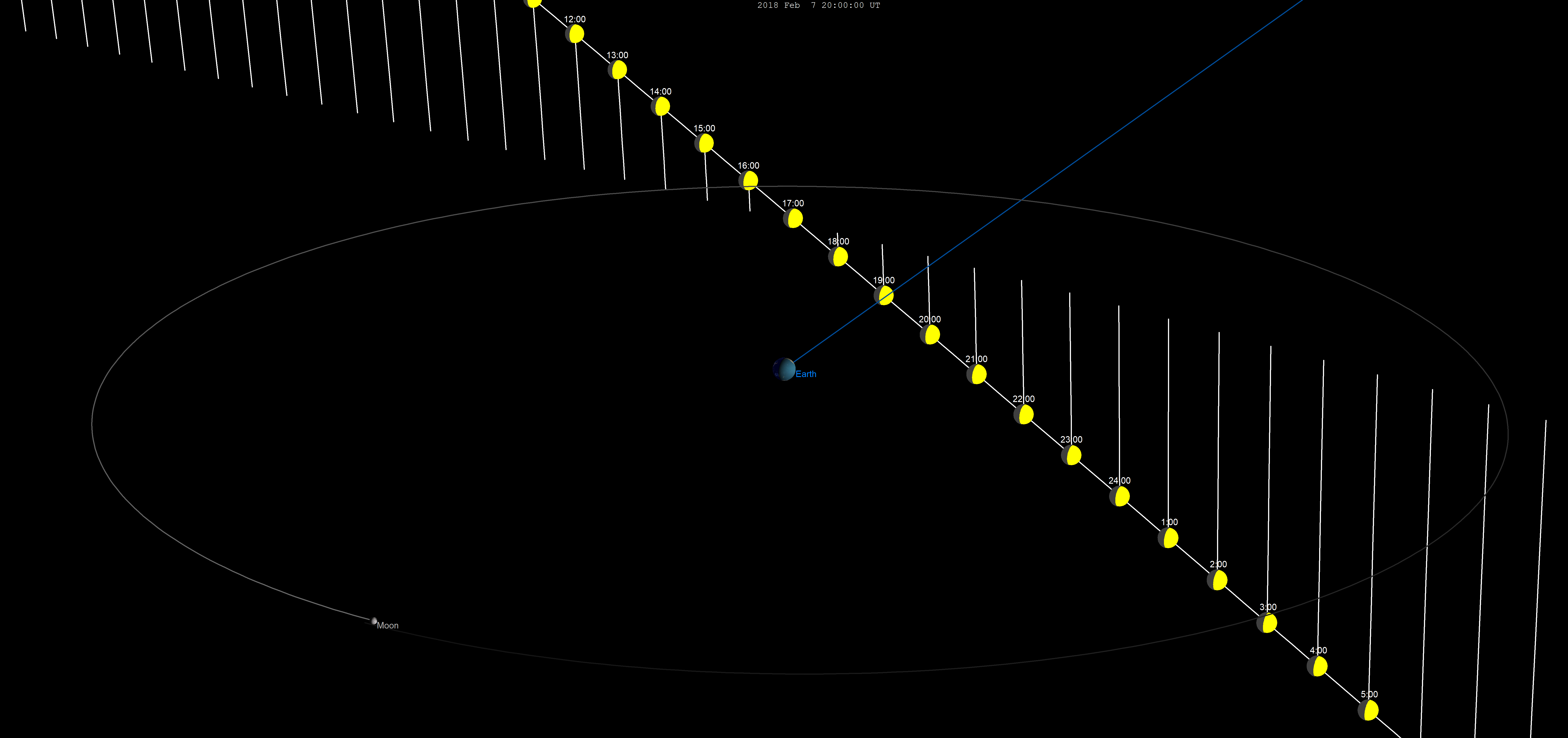
2018 flyby: Hourly motion across sky at flyby (left). View above Earth–Moon system of flyby with hourly motion (right).

== Physical characteristics ==
The body's physical parameter remain largely unknown. Based on a generic magnitude-to-diameter conversion, and for an absolute magnitude of 26.541, the asteroid measures 15 and 40 meters in diameter, assuming a carbonaceous and stony albedo of 0.057 and 0.20, respectively. No rotational lightcurve has been obtained from photometric observations, and no rotation period, shape or pole has been determined.

== Naming ==
As of 2018, this minor planet has not been numbered or named.

== See also ==
- List of asteroid close approaches to Earth in 2018
