= 2005 ED224 =

Risk–listed near-Earth asteroid

2005 ED_{224}
Discovery
- Discovered by: LINEAR (704); 1.0-m Reflector
- Discovery site: Lincoln Lab's ETS
- Discovery date: 13 March 2005

Designations
- Minor planet category: NEO; Apollo; risk listed

Orbital characteristics
- Epoch 16 March 2005 (JD 2453445.5)
- Uncertainty parameter 9
- Observation arc: 3.1 days
- Aphelion: 3.17±0.26 AU (Q)
- Perihelion: 0.649±0.003 AU (q)
- Semi-major axis: 1.91±0.16 AU (a)
- Eccentricity: 0.66±0.03 (e)
- Orbital period (sidereal): 2.6±0.3 years
- Mean anomaly: 20°±3° (M)
- Inclination: 31.9°±1.1° (i)
- Longitude of ascending node: 170.53°±0.06° (Ω)
- Argument of perihelion: 277.3°±0.9° (ω)
- Earth MOID: 0.0013 AU (190,000 km) ?
- Jupiter MOID: 2.9 AU (430,000,000 km) ?

Physical characteristics
- Dimensions: ~54 m (180 ft)?; 40–90 meters
- Absolute magnitude (H): 23.99 (JPL); 24.3 (MPC)

2005 ED_{224} is an near-Earth asteroid with an estimated diameter of 54 meters. It had the soonest virtual impactor of an asteroid larger than 50 meters in diameter with a better than 1:1,000,000 chance of impacting Earth. On 11 March 2023, the line of variations (LOV) showed a 1-in-500,000 chance of impact. It has a short observation arc of 3 days. On 11 March 2023, it was nominally expected to be 2.7 AU (400 million km) from Earth but had an uncertainty region billions of kilometers long. Since it has not been observed since 2005 and has an orbital period of 2.6±0.3 years, it is unknown where on its orbit 2005 ED_{224} is. Between 2005 and 2023, it could have orbited the Sun 6.2 to 7.8 times. On 11 March 2030, it has a 1-in-6,300,000 chance of impact but is expected to be 3.5 AU (520 million km) from Earth (near the asteroid's farthest distance from the Sun). On 10 March 2064, it has a 1-in-2,600,000 chance of impact but is expected to be 3.2 AU (480 million km) from Earth.

It was first observed on 13 March 2005 when the asteroid was estimated to be 0.056 ± 0.006 AU (8.38 ± 0.90 million km) from Earth and had a solar elongation of 137 degrees.

Virtual impactors (past and future)
Date	Impact probability (1 in)	JPL Horizons nominal geocentric distance (AU)	NEODyS nominal geocentric distance (AU)	MPC nominal geocentric distance (AU)	Find_Orb nominal geocentric distance (AU)	uncertainty region (3-sigma)
2018-03-11	2.4 million	1.7 AU (250 million km)	1.7 AU (250 million km)	1.4 AU (210 million km)	1.2 AU (180 million km)	± 5 billion km
2023-03-11	500 thousand	2.7 AU (400 million km)	2.7 AU (400 million km)	0.95 AU (142 million km)	4.0 AU (600 million km)	± 3 billion km

The 11 March 2018 virtual impactor did not occur. The line of variation (LOV) for 2018 was billions of kilometers long and wrapped around the asteroid's orbit so that the asteroid could have been numerous different distances from the Earth. The 2023 line of variation (LOV) was also billions of kilometers long and stretched around the asteroid's known orbit.

== See also ==
- 2007 FT3
- 2014 MV67
