= List of minor planets: 725001–726000 =

The following is a partial list of minor planets, running from minor-planet number 725001 through 726000, inclusive. The primary data for this and other partial lists is based on JPL's "Small-Body Orbital Elements" and data available from the Minor Planet Center. Critical list information is also provided by the MPC, unless otherwise specified from Lowell Observatory. A detailed description of the table's columns and additional sources are given on the main page including a complete list of every page in this series, and a statistical break-up on the dynamical classification of minor planets.

Also see the summary list of all named bodies in numerical and alphabetical order, and the corresponding naming citations for the number range of this particular list. New namings may only be added to this list after official publication, as the preannouncement of names is condemned by the Working Group for Small Bodies Nomenclature of the International Astronomical Union.

Near-Earth obj.	MBA (inner)	MBA (outer)	Centaur
Mars-crosser	MBA (middle)	Jupiter trojan	Trans-Neptunian obj.
Unclassified

== 725001–725100 ==
Designation			Discovery			Properties		Ref
Permanent	Provisional	Named after	Date	Site	Discoverer(s)	Category	Diam.	Ref
725001	2008 SY_{324}	—	January 4, 2016	Haleakala	Pan-STARRS 1	·	2.7 km	MPC · JPL
725002	2008 SF_{325}	—	September 23, 2008	Mount Lemmon	Mount Lemmon Survey	·	2.0 km	MPC · JPL
725003	2008 SG_{325}	—	October 17, 2003	Kitt Peak	Spacewatch	·	1.5 km	MPC · JPL
725004	2008 SM_{325}	—	September 22, 2008	Mount Lemmon	Mount Lemmon Survey	·	1.7 km	MPC · JPL
725005	2008 SN_{325}	—	June 20, 2013	Haleakala	Pan-STARRS 1	EOS	1.3 km	MPC · JPL
725006	2008 SA_{326}	—	September 22, 2008	Kitt Peak	Spacewatch	EOS	1.6 km	MPC · JPL
725007	2008 SO_{326}	—	October 25, 2014	Kitt Peak	Spacewatch	·	1.8 km	MPC · JPL
725008	2008 SO_{327}	—	September 24, 2008	Mount Lemmon	Mount Lemmon Survey	·	830 m	MPC · JPL
725009	2008 SA_{332}	—	September 23, 2008	Mount Lemmon	Mount Lemmon Survey	·	1.9 km	MPC · JPL
725010	2008 SU_{332}	—	September 25, 2008	Mount Lemmon	Mount Lemmon Survey	·	2.2 km	MPC · JPL
725011	2008 SO_{333}	—	September 23, 2008	Kitt Peak	Spacewatch	·	1.1 km	MPC · JPL
725012	2008 SU_{334}	—	September 29, 2008	Mount Lemmon	Mount Lemmon Survey	·	2.4 km	MPC · JPL
725013	2008 SV_{334}	—	January 12, 2010	Mount Lemmon	Mount Lemmon Survey	·	2.2 km	MPC · JPL
725014	2008 SH_{336}	—	February 26, 2011	Mount Lemmon	Mount Lemmon Survey	EOS	1.2 km	MPC · JPL
725015	2008 SP_{337}	—	April 21, 2015	Cerro Tololo-DECam	DECam	L4	5.9 km	MPC · JPL
725016	2008 SX_{337}	—	December 23, 2012	Haleakala	Pan-STARRS 1	L4	7.1 km	MPC · JPL
725017	2008 SB_{339}	—	September 20, 2008	Mount Lemmon	Mount Lemmon Survey	·	2.2 km	MPC · JPL
725018	2008 SC_{339}	—	September 24, 2008	Kitt Peak	Spacewatch	AST	1.5 km	MPC · JPL
725019	2008 SG_{339}	—	September 27, 2008	Mount Lemmon	Mount Lemmon Survey	·	2.3 km	MPC · JPL
725020	2008 SJ_{340}	—	September 27, 2008	Mount Lemmon	Mount Lemmon Survey	EOS	1.4 km	MPC · JPL
725021	2008 SL_{340}	—	September 24, 2008	Kitt Peak	Spacewatch	·	1.8 km	MPC · JPL
725022	2008 SZ_{340}	—	September 22, 2008	Mount Lemmon	Mount Lemmon Survey	·	2.8 km	MPC · JPL
725023	2008 SA_{341}	—	September 24, 2008	Mount Lemmon	Mount Lemmon Survey	·	2.5 km	MPC · JPL
725024	2008 SY_{342}	—	September 23, 2008	Kitt Peak	Spacewatch	·	480 m	MPC · JPL
725025	2008 SA_{344}	—	September 29, 2008	Kitt Peak	Spacewatch	·	3.2 km	MPC · JPL
725026	2008 SL_{347}	—	September 22, 2008	Kitt Peak	Spacewatch	·	2.3 km	MPC · JPL
725027	2008 SC_{349}	—	September 22, 2008	Mount Lemmon	Mount Lemmon Survey	·	1.3 km	MPC · JPL
725028	2008 SD_{351}	—	September 24, 2008	Mount Lemmon	Mount Lemmon Survey	EOS	1.4 km	MPC · JPL
725029	2008 SL_{354}	—	September 28, 2008	Mount Lemmon	Mount Lemmon Survey	·	1.2 km	MPC · JPL
725030	2008 SX_{357}	—	September 29, 2008	Kitt Peak	Spacewatch	KON	1.6 km	MPC · JPL
725031	2008 TH_{21}	—	October 1, 2008	Mount Lemmon	Mount Lemmon Survey	·	2.0 km	MPC · JPL
725032	2008 TD_{25}	—	October 2, 2008	Mount Lemmon	Mount Lemmon Survey	(5)	920 m	MPC · JPL
725033	2008 TX_{30}	—	September 24, 2008	Kitt Peak	Spacewatch	·	1.9 km	MPC · JPL
725034	2008 TN_{31}	—	October 1, 2008	Kitt Peak	Spacewatch	·	970 m	MPC · JPL
725035	2008 TV_{31}	—	October 1, 2008	Kitt Peak	Spacewatch	·	2.4 km	MPC · JPL
725036	2008 TR_{32}	—	September 24, 2008	Kitt Peak	Spacewatch	·	540 m	MPC · JPL
725037	2008 TN_{34}	—	October 1, 2008	Kitt Peak	Spacewatch	·	2.4 km	MPC · JPL
725038	2008 TZ_{40}	—	October 1, 2008	Mount Lemmon	Mount Lemmon Survey	·	2.3 km	MPC · JPL
725039	2008 TS_{43}	—	October 1, 2008	Mount Lemmon	Mount Lemmon Survey	·	2.4 km	MPC · JPL
725040	2008 TU_{49}	—	October 2, 2008	Kitt Peak	Spacewatch	·	2.2 km	MPC · JPL
725041	2008 TM_{58}	—	September 27, 2003	Kitt Peak	Spacewatch	KOR	1.2 km	MPC · JPL
725042	2008 TO_{58}	—	October 2, 2008	Kitt Peak	Spacewatch	EOS	1.5 km	MPC · JPL
725043	2008 TB_{59}	—	October 2, 2008	Kitt Peak	Spacewatch	·	1.9 km	MPC · JPL
725044	2008 TQ_{64}	—	October 2, 2008	Kitt Peak	Spacewatch	·	610 m	MPC · JPL
725045	2008 TJ_{76}	—	October 22, 2003	Kitt Peak	Spacewatch	·	1.9 km	MPC · JPL
725046	2008 TU_{86}	—	October 3, 2008	Kitt Peak	Spacewatch	·	2.6 km	MPC · JPL
725047	2008 TU_{87}	—	October 3, 2008	Kitt Peak	Spacewatch	MAR	800 m	MPC · JPL
725048	2008 TE_{95}	—	August 25, 2003	Cerro Tololo	Deep Ecliptic Survey	·	1.9 km	MPC · JPL
725049	2008 TQ_{100}	—	March 26, 2007	Mount Lemmon	Mount Lemmon Survey	·	800 m	MPC · JPL
725050	2008 TV_{100}	—	October 6, 2008	Kitt Peak	Spacewatch	·	1.9 km	MPC · JPL
725051	2008 TY_{110}	—	September 29, 2008	Kitt Peak	Spacewatch	·	1.7 km	MPC · JPL
725052	2008 TU_{113}	—	October 2, 2008	Kitt Peak	Spacewatch	·	2.1 km	MPC · JPL
725053	2008 TO_{114}	—	September 27, 2008	Mount Lemmon	Mount Lemmon Survey	·	2.5 km	MPC · JPL
725054	2008 TV_{119}	—	October 7, 2008	Kitt Peak	Spacewatch	VER	2.3 km	MPC · JPL
725055	2008 TH_{130}	—	October 8, 2008	Mount Lemmon	Mount Lemmon Survey	·	1.9 km	MPC · JPL
725056	2008 TV_{141}	—	September 10, 2008	Kitt Peak	Spacewatch	·	2.1 km	MPC · JPL
725057	2008 TU_{143}	—	September 2, 2008	Kitt Peak	Spacewatch	·	770 m	MPC · JPL
725058	2008 TV_{146}	—	September 3, 2008	Kitt Peak	Spacewatch	·	510 m	MPC · JPL
725059	2008 TQ_{148}	—	September 23, 2008	Mount Lemmon	Mount Lemmon Survey	·	1.7 km	MPC · JPL
725060	2008 TZ_{151}	—	March 11, 2005	Mount Lemmon	Mount Lemmon Survey	·	2.7 km	MPC · JPL
725061	2008 TW_{153}	—	October 9, 2008	Mount Lemmon	Mount Lemmon Survey	EOS	2.1 km	MPC · JPL
725062	2008 TK_{155}	—	October 9, 2008	Mount Lemmon	Mount Lemmon Survey	·	2.4 km	MPC · JPL
725063	2008 TR_{155}	—	October 9, 2008	Mount Lemmon	Mount Lemmon Survey	EOS	1.6 km	MPC · JPL
725064	2008 TG_{159}	—	October 8, 2008	Kitt Peak	Spacewatch	HOF	2.3 km	MPC · JPL
725065	2008 TG_{165}	—	October 2, 2008	Kitt Peak	Spacewatch	·	1.0 km	MPC · JPL
725066	2008 TE_{174}	—	October 2, 2008	Mount Lemmon	Mount Lemmon Survey	L4	9.7 km	MPC · JPL
725067	2008 TW_{175}	—	January 17, 2015	Haleakala	Pan-STARRS 1	EOS	1.5 km	MPC · JPL
725068	2008 TG_{180}	—	October 2, 2008	Catalina	CSS	·	2.2 km	MPC · JPL
725069	2008 TF_{181}	—	October 7, 2008	Mount Lemmon	Mount Lemmon Survey	·	420 m	MPC · JPL
725070	2008 TE_{191}	—	July 20, 2002	Palomar	NEAT	·	3.5 km	MPC · JPL
725071	2008 TB_{192}	—	October 8, 2008	Mount Lemmon	Mount Lemmon Survey	MAR	890 m	MPC · JPL
725072	2008 TZ_{192}	—	October 9, 2008	Kitt Peak	Spacewatch	·	2.6 km	MPC · JPL
725073	2008 TW_{193}	—	October 10, 2008	Mount Lemmon	Mount Lemmon Survey	·	1.2 km	MPC · JPL
725074	2008 TB_{194}	—	October 8, 2008	Catalina	CSS	·	1.4 km	MPC · JPL
725075	2008 TS_{194}	—	September 29, 2008	Kitt Peak	Spacewatch	3:2	4.6 km	MPC · JPL
725076	2008 TU_{194}	—	August 24, 2008	Kitt Peak	Spacewatch	3:2	4.9 km	MPC · JPL
725077	2008 TY_{195}	—	October 1, 2008	Mount Lemmon	Mount Lemmon Survey	·	2.1 km	MPC · JPL
725078	2008 TD_{196}	—	October 2, 2008	Kitt Peak	Spacewatch	HOF	1.9 km	MPC · JPL
725079	2008 TT_{196}	—	April 3, 2011	Haleakala	Pan-STARRS 1	·	2.3 km	MPC · JPL
725080	2008 TG_{197}	—	March 26, 2010	WISE	WISE	·	2.6 km	MPC · JPL
725081	2008 TN_{198}	—	October 8, 2008	Mount Lemmon	Mount Lemmon Survey	·	3.2 km	MPC · JPL
725082	2008 TD_{199}	—	October 7, 2008	Mount Lemmon	Mount Lemmon Survey	·	1.3 km	MPC · JPL
725083	2008 TH_{199}	—	March 20, 2015	Haleakala	Pan-STARRS 1	·	800 m	MPC · JPL
725084	2008 TQ_{199}	—	May 21, 2012	Haleakala	Pan-STARRS 1	·	2.1 km	MPC · JPL
725085	2008 TO_{200}	—	October 7, 2008	Mount Lemmon	Mount Lemmon Survey	·	2.5 km	MPC · JPL
725086	2008 TW_{200}	—	October 8, 2008	Mount Lemmon	Mount Lemmon Survey	·	2.3 km	MPC · JPL
725087	2008 TE_{201}	—	October 9, 2008	Mount Lemmon	Mount Lemmon Survey	·	3.1 km	MPC · JPL
725088	2008 TN_{201}	—	October 6, 2008	Kitt Peak	Spacewatch	·	2.7 km	MPC · JPL
725089	2008 TG_{204}	—	February 7, 2010	La Sagra	OAM	TIR	2.7 km	MPC · JPL
725090	2008 TN_{204}	—	October 10, 2008	Mount Lemmon	Mount Lemmon Survey	EOS	1.6 km	MPC · JPL
725091	2008 TG_{205}	—	October 7, 2008	Kitt Peak	Spacewatch	·	2.0 km	MPC · JPL
725092	2008 TS_{205}	—	October 1, 2008	Mount Lemmon	Mount Lemmon Survey	·	2.5 km	MPC · JPL
725093	2008 TX_{205}	—	October 8, 2008	Kitt Peak	Spacewatch	·	590 m	MPC · JPL
725094	2008 TJ_{207}	—	October 10, 2008	Mount Lemmon	Mount Lemmon Survey	·	1.3 km	MPC · JPL
725095	2008 TN_{208}	—	April 5, 2010	WISE	WISE	·	1.6 km	MPC · JPL
725096	2008 TL_{211}	—	February 12, 2011	Mount Lemmon	Mount Lemmon Survey	·	2.8 km	MPC · JPL
725097	2008 TZ_{212}	—	April 15, 2010	WISE	WISE	·	1.5 km	MPC · JPL
725098	2008 TR_{214}	—	September 25, 2013	Mount Lemmon	Mount Lemmon Survey	·	2.1 km	MPC · JPL
725099	2008 TS_{214}	—	October 6, 2008	Mount Lemmon	Mount Lemmon Survey	·	1.9 km	MPC · JPL
725100	2008 TZ_{217}	—	October 1, 2008	Mount Lemmon	Mount Lemmon Survey	·	2.1 km	MPC · JPL

== 725101–725200 ==
back to top

Designation			Discovery			Properties		Ref
Permanent	Provisional	Named after	Date	Site	Discoverer(s)	Category	Diam.	Ref
725101	2008 TN_{218}	—	October 8, 2008	Kitt Peak	Spacewatch	·	1.1 km	MPC · JPL
725102	2008 TS_{220}	—	October 10, 2008	Mount Lemmon	Mount Lemmon Survey	·	1.3 km	MPC · JPL
725103	2008 TM_{221}	—	October 6, 2008	Kitt Peak	Spacewatch	·	1.9 km	MPC · JPL
725104	2008 TR_{226}	—	October 7, 2008	Mount Lemmon	Mount Lemmon Survey	·	1.4 km	MPC · JPL
725105	2008 TG_{228}	—	October 8, 2008	Mount Lemmon	Mount Lemmon Survey	·	1.5 km	MPC · JPL
725106	2008 TC_{231}	—	October 8, 2008	Mount Lemmon	Mount Lemmon Survey	EOS	1.5 km	MPC · JPL
725107	2008 TA_{237}	—	October 8, 2008	Mount Lemmon	Mount Lemmon Survey	·	690 m	MPC · JPL
725108	2008 TG_{240}	—	October 10, 2008	Mount Lemmon	Mount Lemmon Survey	3:2	4.6 km	MPC · JPL
725109	2008 UH_{2}	—	October 20, 2008	Majdanak	Sergeyev, A.	·	1.4 km	MPC · JPL
725110	2008 UP_{5}	—	October 25, 2008	Dauban	C. Rinner, Kugel, F.	·	1.6 km	MPC · JPL
725111	2008 UX_{6}	—	September 29, 2008	Catalina	CSS	·	2.4 km	MPC · JPL
725112	2008 UK_{14}	—	September 3, 2008	Kitt Peak	Spacewatch	·	700 m	MPC · JPL
725113	2008 UQ_{16}	—	September 9, 2008	Mount Lemmon	Mount Lemmon Survey	·	1.6 km	MPC · JPL
725114	2008 UJ_{17}	—	October 18, 2008	Kitt Peak	Spacewatch	·	2.2 km	MPC · JPL
725115	2008 US_{18}	—	October 19, 2008	Kitt Peak	Spacewatch	·	1.2 km	MPC · JPL
725116	2008 UB_{35}	—	October 20, 2008	Kitt Peak	Spacewatch	·	2.8 km	MPC · JPL
725117	2008 UD_{35}	—	October 20, 2008	Kitt Peak	Spacewatch	·	2.5 km	MPC · JPL
725118	2008 UL_{37}	—	October 20, 2008	Kitt Peak	Spacewatch	·	1.9 km	MPC · JPL
725119	2008 UH_{47}	—	October 20, 2008	Kitt Peak	Spacewatch	·	1.5 km	MPC · JPL
725120	2008 UY_{49}	—	September 23, 2008	Kitt Peak	Spacewatch	·	2.4 km	MPC · JPL
725121	2008 UG_{51}	—	October 18, 2008	Kitt Peak	Spacewatch	·	770 m	MPC · JPL
725122	2008 UU_{54}	—	October 20, 2008	Mount Lemmon	Mount Lemmon Survey	THB	2.8 km	MPC · JPL
725123	2008 UN_{56}	—	October 21, 2008	Kitt Peak	Spacewatch	·	800 m	MPC · JPL
725124	2008 UL_{59}	—	October 21, 2008	Mount Lemmon	Mount Lemmon Survey	·	3.2 km	MPC · JPL
725125	2008 UY_{64}	—	October 21, 2008	Kitt Peak	Spacewatch	·	3.1 km	MPC · JPL
725126	2008 UP_{71}	—	October 21, 2008	Mount Lemmon	Mount Lemmon Survey	·	3.1 km	MPC · JPL
725127	2008 US_{74}	—	October 21, 2008	Kitt Peak	Spacewatch	·	870 m	MPC · JPL
725128	2008 UK_{79}	—	September 7, 2008	Mount Lemmon	Mount Lemmon Survey	·	2.1 km	MPC · JPL
725129	2008 UJ_{80}	—	October 22, 2008	Kitt Peak	Spacewatch	·	2.8 km	MPC · JPL
725130	2008 US_{82}	—	October 22, 2008	Kitt Peak	Spacewatch	·	1.5 km	MPC · JPL
725131	2008 UH_{85}	—	September 9, 2008	Mount Lemmon	Mount Lemmon Survey	·	2.4 km	MPC · JPL
725132	2008 UK_{86}	—	October 23, 2008	Kitt Peak	Spacewatch	·	2.1 km	MPC · JPL
725133	2008 UZ_{89}	—	October 24, 2008	Kitt Peak	Spacewatch	·	1.1 km	MPC · JPL
725134	2008 UX_{103}	—	September 26, 2008	Kitt Peak	Spacewatch	·	800 m	MPC · JPL
725135	2008 UQ_{104}	—	October 20, 2008	Mount Lemmon	Mount Lemmon Survey	·	2.3 km	MPC · JPL
725136	2008 UG_{105}	—	October 20, 2008	Mount Lemmon	Mount Lemmon Survey	·	1.6 km	MPC · JPL
725137	2008 UN_{114}	—	September 28, 2008	Mount Lemmon	Mount Lemmon Survey	·	2.8 km	MPC · JPL
725138	2008 UZ_{114}	—	October 22, 2008	Kitt Peak	Spacewatch	EOS	1.4 km	MPC · JPL
725139	2008 UF_{117}	—	October 22, 2008	Kitt Peak	Spacewatch	·	490 m	MPC · JPL
725140	2008 UE_{121}	—	October 22, 2008	Kitt Peak	Spacewatch	VER	2.2 km	MPC · JPL
725141	2008 UE_{123}	—	October 22, 2008	Kitt Peak	Spacewatch	EOS	1.8 km	MPC · JPL
725142	2008 UH_{129}	—	October 9, 2008	Kitt Peak	Spacewatch	EMA	2.0 km	MPC · JPL
725143	2008 UF_{131}	—	October 1, 2008	Mount Lemmon	Mount Lemmon Survey	VER	2.2 km	MPC · JPL
725144	2008 UM_{134}	—	October 1, 2008	Mount Lemmon	Mount Lemmon Survey	·	1.9 km	MPC · JPL
725145	2008 UA_{137}	—	October 23, 2008	Kitt Peak	Spacewatch	EOS	1.7 km	MPC · JPL
725146	2008 UY_{137}	—	October 23, 2008	Kitt Peak	Spacewatch	·	1.8 km	MPC · JPL
725147	2008 UU_{152}	—	October 3, 2008	Kitt Peak	Spacewatch	·	1.7 km	MPC · JPL
725148	2008 UZ_{154}	—	October 7, 2008	Kitt Peak	Spacewatch	·	2.5 km	MPC · JPL
725149	2008 UR_{156}	—	October 9, 2008	Mount Lemmon	Mount Lemmon Survey	·	1.6 km	MPC · JPL
725150	2008 UN_{159}	—	October 23, 2008	Kitt Peak	Spacewatch	·	1.8 km	MPC · JPL
725151	2008 UQ_{163}	—	September 24, 2008	Kitt Peak	Spacewatch	·	2.3 km	MPC · JPL
725152	2008 UV_{164}	—	September 22, 2008	Kitt Peak	Spacewatch	EOS	1.5 km	MPC · JPL
725153	2008 UY_{177}	—	October 10, 2008	Mount Lemmon	Mount Lemmon Survey	·	1.9 km	MPC · JPL
725154	2008 UU_{179}	—	October 24, 2008	Kitt Peak	Spacewatch	EOS	1.9 km	MPC · JPL
725155	2008 UE_{182}	—	October 24, 2008	Mount Lemmon	Mount Lemmon Survey	·	1.9 km	MPC · JPL
725156	2008 UK_{182}	—	October 24, 2008	Mount Lemmon	Mount Lemmon Survey	·	1.4 km	MPC · JPL
725157	2008 UX_{192}	—	October 25, 2008	Mount Lemmon	Mount Lemmon Survey	·	2.5 km	MPC · JPL
725158	2008 US_{195}	—	October 26, 2008	Mount Lemmon	Mount Lemmon Survey	·	1.6 km	MPC · JPL
725159	2008 UP_{210}	—	October 23, 2008	Kitt Peak	Spacewatch	·	1.5 km	MPC · JPL
725160	2008 UP_{211}	—	September 28, 2008	Socorro	LINEAR	·	2.0 km	MPC · JPL
725161	2008 UJ_{212}	—	September 28, 2001	Palomar	NEAT	·	570 m	MPC · JPL
725162	2008 UM_{219}	—	September 28, 2008	Mount Lemmon	Mount Lemmon Survey	VER	2.2 km	MPC · JPL
725163	2008 UZ_{222}	—	October 25, 2008	Kitt Peak	Spacewatch	·	3.6 km	MPC · JPL
725164	2008 UV_{226}	—	September 24, 2008	Mount Lemmon	Mount Lemmon Survey	·	2.5 km	MPC · JPL
725165	2008 UF_{232}	—	September 24, 2008	Mount Lemmon	Mount Lemmon Survey	·	2.5 km	MPC · JPL
725166	2008 UW_{234}	—	September 23, 2008	Kitt Peak	Spacewatch	·	1 km	MPC · JPL
725167	2008 UB_{237}	—	October 26, 2008	Kitt Peak	Spacewatch	·	1.6 km	MPC · JPL
725168	2008 US_{237}	—	October 26, 2008	Kitt Peak	Spacewatch	EOS	2.1 km	MPC · JPL
725169	2008 UM_{238}	—	October 26, 2008	Kitt Peak	Spacewatch	EOS	1.5 km	MPC · JPL
725170	2008 UF_{239}	—	October 22, 2008	Kitt Peak	Spacewatch	·	3.3 km	MPC · JPL
725171	2008 UM_{243}	—	October 26, 2008	Kitt Peak	Spacewatch	URS	4.5 km	MPC · JPL
725172	2008 UU_{243}	—	October 26, 2008	Kitt Peak	Spacewatch	·	3.4 km	MPC · JPL
725173	2008 US_{247}	—	October 26, 2008	Kitt Peak	Spacewatch	·	2.9 km	MPC · JPL
725174	2008 UT_{252}	—	October 27, 2008	Kitt Peak	Spacewatch	·	1.1 km	MPC · JPL
725175	2008 UP_{253}	—	October 27, 2008	Kitt Peak	Spacewatch	·	2.0 km	MPC · JPL
725176	2008 UE_{257}	—	October 27, 2008	Mount Lemmon	Mount Lemmon Survey	·	3.0 km	MPC · JPL
725177	2008 UZ_{261}	—	October 27, 2008	Mount Lemmon	Mount Lemmon Survey	·	520 m	MPC · JPL
725178	2008 UE_{262}	—	October 27, 2008	Kitt Peak	Spacewatch	(6355)	3.3 km	MPC · JPL
725179	2008 UT_{268}	—	October 28, 2008	Kitt Peak	Spacewatch	KOR	1.0 km	MPC · JPL
725180	2008 UL_{272}	—	October 28, 2008	Kitt Peak	Spacewatch	·	1.2 km	MPC · JPL
725181	2008 UU_{273}	—	October 28, 2008	Kitt Peak	Spacewatch	·	1.7 km	MPC · JPL
725182	2008 UZ_{273}	—	October 28, 2008	Kitt Peak	Spacewatch	·	2.2 km	MPC · JPL
725183	2008 UU_{276}	—	May 3, 2006	Mount Lemmon	Mount Lemmon Survey	EUN	850 m	MPC · JPL
725184	2008 UJ_{283}	—	September 25, 2008	Kitt Peak	Spacewatch	·	2.0 km	MPC · JPL
725185	2008 UY_{287}	—	September 26, 2008	Kitt Peak	Spacewatch	3:2 · SHU	3.9 km	MPC · JPL
725186	2008 UZ_{292}	—	February 9, 2005	Kitt Peak	Spacewatch	·	3.3 km	MPC · JPL
725187	2008 UE_{294}	—	October 29, 2008	Kitt Peak	Spacewatch	·	500 m	MPC · JPL
725188	2008 UZ_{294}	—	October 29, 2008	Kitt Peak	Spacewatch	VER	2.3 km	MPC · JPL
725189	2008 US_{296}	—	October 29, 2008	Kitt Peak	Spacewatch	·	1.3 km	MPC · JPL
725190	2008 UX_{296}	—	October 29, 2008	Kitt Peak	Spacewatch	·	540 m	MPC · JPL
725191	2008 UZ_{296}	—	October 29, 2008	Kitt Peak	Spacewatch	·	2.1 km	MPC · JPL
725192	2008 UH_{297}	—	October 22, 2008	Kitt Peak	Spacewatch	·	2.9 km	MPC · JPL
725193	2008 UD_{298}	—	October 29, 2008	Kitt Peak	Spacewatch	VER	2.5 km	MPC · JPL
725194	2008 UN_{299}	—	October 29, 2008	Kitt Peak	Spacewatch	·	810 m	MPC · JPL
725195	2008 UO_{299}	—	October 29, 2008	Kitt Peak	Spacewatch	·	1.0 km	MPC · JPL
725196	2008 UX_{300}	—	October 29, 2008	Kitt Peak	Spacewatch	VER	2.2 km	MPC · JPL
725197	2008 UX_{301}	—	October 29, 2008	Mount Lemmon	Mount Lemmon Survey	·	2.3 km	MPC · JPL
725198	2008 UX_{302}	—	October 21, 2008	Kitt Peak	Spacewatch	HOF	2.6 km	MPC · JPL
725199	2008 UX_{303}	—	October 29, 2008	Mount Lemmon	Mount Lemmon Survey	·	1.0 km	MPC · JPL
725200	2008 UU_{305}	—	October 30, 2008	Kitt Peak	Spacewatch	3:2	4.9 km	MPC · JPL

== 725201–725300 ==
back to top

Designation			Discovery			Properties		Ref
Permanent	Provisional	Named after	Date	Site	Discoverer(s)	Category	Diam.	Ref
725201	2008 UX_{306}	—	October 22, 2008	Kitt Peak	Spacewatch	EOS	1.7 km	MPC · JPL
725202	2008 UZ_{307}	—	October 26, 2008	Kitt Peak	Spacewatch	·	1.3 km	MPC · JPL
725203	2008 UD_{308}	—	October 22, 2008	Kitt Peak	Spacewatch	·	2.4 km	MPC · JPL
725204	2008 UL_{308}	—	October 30, 2008	Kitt Peak	Spacewatch	·	2.3 km	MPC · JPL
725205	2008 UM_{311}	—	October 30, 2008	Kitt Peak	Spacewatch	·	2.9 km	MPC · JPL
725206	2008 UK_{314}	—	October 30, 2008	Kitt Peak	Spacewatch	·	770 m	MPC · JPL
725207	2008 UM_{314}	—	October 30, 2008	Mount Lemmon	Mount Lemmon Survey	·	2.7 km	MPC · JPL
725208	2008 UG_{318}	—	October 31, 2008	Mount Lemmon	Mount Lemmon Survey	·	2.6 km	MPC · JPL
725209	2008 UW_{322}	—	October 8, 2008	Mount Lemmon	Mount Lemmon Survey	WIT	780 m	MPC · JPL
725210	2008 UC_{324}	—	November 15, 2003	Kitt Peak	Spacewatch	·	3.8 km	MPC · JPL
725211	2008 UD_{325}	—	October 31, 2008	Mount Lemmon	Mount Lemmon Survey	·	1.8 km	MPC · JPL
725212	2008 UQ_{327}	—	October 10, 2008	Mount Lemmon	Mount Lemmon Survey	·	2.2 km	MPC · JPL
725213	2008 UV_{328}	—	January 11, 1997	Kitt Peak	Spacewatch	(5)	1.0 km	MPC · JPL
725214	2008 UA_{329}	—	October 30, 2008	Mount Lemmon	Mount Lemmon Survey	EOS	1.7 km	MPC · JPL
725215	2008 UZ_{332}	—	October 26, 2008	Cerro Tololo	Wasserman, L. H.	·	2.9 km	MPC · JPL
725216	2008 UL_{349}	—	October 28, 2008	Kitt Peak	Spacewatch	·	1.9 km	MPC · JPL
725217	2008 UN_{349}	—	October 28, 2008	Kitt Peak	Spacewatch	·	2.0 km	MPC · JPL
725218	2008 UJ_{351}	—	October 31, 2008	Kitt Peak	Spacewatch	·	2.1 km	MPC · JPL
725219	2008 UZ_{352}	—	October 31, 2008	Kitt Peak	Spacewatch	·	4.2 km	MPC · JPL
725220	2008 UJ_{356}	—	October 23, 2008	Kitt Peak	Spacewatch	·	2.0 km	MPC · JPL
725221	2008 UZ_{359}	—	October 29, 2008	Kitt Peak	Spacewatch	·	2.9 km	MPC · JPL
725222	2008 UE_{360}	—	October 29, 2008	Kitt Peak	Spacewatch	·	2.7 km	MPC · JPL
725223	2008 UL_{369}	—	October 28, 2008	Kitt Peak	Spacewatch	·	3.0 km	MPC · JPL
725224	2008 UQ_{369}	—	October 29, 2008	Kitt Peak	Spacewatch	·	2.1 km	MPC · JPL
725225	2008 UG_{374}	—	October 8, 2008	Kitt Peak	Spacewatch	HOF	2.4 km	MPC · JPL
725226	2008 UH_{375}	—	October 28, 2008	Kitt Peak	Spacewatch	·	1.1 km	MPC · JPL
725227	2008 UQ_{377}	—	January 13, 2016	Haleakala	Pan-STARRS 1	EOS	1.9 km	MPC · JPL
725228	2008 UT_{377}	—	March 11, 2010	WISE	WISE	T_{j} (2.99)	4.9 km	MPC · JPL
725229	2008 UC_{378}	—	February 9, 2016	Haleakala	Pan-STARRS 1	·	2.3 km	MPC · JPL
725230	2008 UM_{378}	—	May 2, 2010	WISE	WISE	·	1.3 km	MPC · JPL
725231	2008 UN_{378}	—	October 16, 2012	Kitt Peak	Spacewatch	EUN	1.2 km	MPC · JPL
725232	2008 UV_{378}	—	December 24, 1992	Kitt Peak	Spacewatch	EUN	1.1 km	MPC · JPL
725233	2008 UA_{381}	—	January 29, 2014	Nogales	M. Schwartz, P. R. Holvorcem	·	1.6 km	MPC · JPL
725234	2008 UJ_{381}	—	October 25, 2008	Kitt Peak	Spacewatch	·	2.3 km	MPC · JPL
725235	2008 UG_{382}	—	April 24, 2012	Kitt Peak	Spacewatch	·	2.6 km	MPC · JPL
725236	2008 UN_{382}	—	September 14, 2013	Haleakala	Pan-STARRS 1	·	2.0 km	MPC · JPL
725237	2008 UM_{383}	—	September 21, 2008	Kitt Peak	Spacewatch	·	2.2 km	MPC · JPL
725238	2008 UB_{384}	—	October 27, 2016	Mount Lemmon	Mount Lemmon Survey	·	1.2 km	MPC · JPL
725239	2008 UF_{385}	—	October 11, 2012	Haleakala	Pan-STARRS 1	(5)	770 m	MPC · JPL
725240	2008 UN_{387}	—	October 25, 2008	Mount Lemmon	Mount Lemmon Survey	·	2.4 km	MPC · JPL
725241	2008 UQ_{387}	—	June 16, 2018	Haleakala	Pan-STARRS 1	EOS	1.4 km	MPC · JPL
725242	2008 UV_{387}	—	October 21, 2008	Kitt Peak	Spacewatch	·	2.4 km	MPC · JPL
725243	2008 UH_{388}	—	September 23, 2013	Kitt Peak	Spacewatch	·	1.6 km	MPC · JPL
725244	2008 UM_{388}	—	September 4, 2002	Palomar	NEAT	·	2.0 km	MPC · JPL
725245	2008 UO_{388}	—	April 2, 2011	Mount Lemmon	Mount Lemmon Survey	·	2.3 km	MPC · JPL
725246	2008 UY_{388}	—	June 23, 2018	Haleakala	Pan-STARRS 1	·	2.5 km	MPC · JPL
725247	2008 UB_{389}	—	October 20, 2008	Mount Lemmon	Mount Lemmon Survey	·	2.1 km	MPC · JPL
725248	2008 UF_{389}	—	September 1, 2013	Haleakala	Pan-STARRS 1	HYG	2.2 km	MPC · JPL
725249	2008 UK_{389}	—	October 27, 2008	Kitt Peak	Spacewatch	·	2.2 km	MPC · JPL
725250	2008 UN_{389}	—	October 22, 2008	Kitt Peak	Spacewatch	·	3.3 km	MPC · JPL
725251	2008 UW_{389}	—	April 28, 2010	WISE	WISE	KRM	1.8 km	MPC · JPL
725252	2008 UB_{390}	—	October 28, 2008	Mount Lemmon	Mount Lemmon Survey	·	2.3 km	MPC · JPL
725253	2008 UF_{391}	—	March 22, 2015	Haleakala	Pan-STARRS 1	·	1.2 km	MPC · JPL
725254	2008 UO_{391}	—	February 9, 2014	Kitt Peak	Spacewatch	·	860 m	MPC · JPL
725255	2008 UZ_{391}	—	March 28, 2016	Cerro Tololo-DECam	DECam	VER	2.1 km	MPC · JPL
725256	2008 UD_{394}	—	February 11, 2016	Haleakala	Pan-STARRS 1	EOS	1.5 km	MPC · JPL
725257	2008 UU_{394}	—	October 28, 2008	Kitt Peak	Spacewatch	·	1.1 km	MPC · JPL
725258	2008 UH_{396}	—	October 20, 2008	Mount Lemmon	Mount Lemmon Survey	·	670 m	MPC · JPL
725259	2008 US_{397}	—	December 18, 2009	Mount Lemmon	Mount Lemmon Survey	·	3.4 km	MPC · JPL
725260	2008 UU_{397}	—	May 27, 2012	Mount Lemmon	Mount Lemmon Survey	·	2.9 km	MPC · JPL
725261	2008 UW_{397}	—	January 13, 2010	Mount Lemmon	Mount Lemmon Survey	·	1.8 km	MPC · JPL
725262	2008 UC_{398}	—	October 21, 2012	Haleakala	Pan-STARRS 1	·	1.1 km	MPC · JPL
725263	2008 UT_{399}	—	October 26, 2008	Mount Lemmon	Mount Lemmon Survey	·	2.0 km	MPC · JPL
725264	2008 UE_{400}	—	October 12, 2016	Kitt Peak	Spacewatch	·	940 m	MPC · JPL
725265	2008 UG_{400}	—	November 6, 2018	Haleakala	Pan-STARRS 2	·	1.7 km	MPC · JPL
725266	2008 UP_{400}	—	November 4, 2013	Mount Lemmon	Mount Lemmon Survey	DOR	2.0 km	MPC · JPL
725267	2008 UC_{401}	—	March 1, 2016	Haleakala	Pan-STARRS 1	EOS	1.6 km	MPC · JPL
725268	2008 UP_{407}	—	October 30, 2008	Kitt Peak	Spacewatch	·	1.1 km	MPC · JPL
725269	2008 UJ_{408}	—	October 27, 2008	Kitt Peak	Spacewatch	AGN	840 m	MPC · JPL
725270	2008 UV_{408}	—	October 23, 2008	Kitt Peak	Spacewatch	·	4.1 km	MPC · JPL
725271	2008 UH_{412}	—	October 26, 2008	Kitt Peak	Spacewatch	TEL	1.0 km	MPC · JPL
725272	2008 UP_{412}	—	October 30, 2008	Mount Lemmon	Mount Lemmon Survey	EOS	1.5 km	MPC · JPL
725273	2008 UZ_{412}	—	October 27, 2008	Kitt Peak	Spacewatch	·	1.7 km	MPC · JPL
725274	2008 UE_{418}	—	October 27, 2008	Kitt Peak	Spacewatch	·	1.3 km	MPC · JPL
725275	2008 UX_{422}	—	October 24, 2008	Kitt Peak	Spacewatch	·	2.1 km	MPC · JPL
725276	2008 VE_{6}	—	November 1, 2008	Kitt Peak	Spacewatch	·	2.0 km	MPC · JPL
725277	2008 VQ_{7}	—	October 8, 2008	Kitt Peak	Spacewatch	·	1.9 km	MPC · JPL
725278	2008 VH_{8}	—	November 2, 2008	Mount Lemmon	Mount Lemmon Survey	·	2.6 km	MPC · JPL
725279	2008 VO_{8}	—	November 2, 2008	Mount Lemmon	Mount Lemmon Survey	EOS	1.6 km	MPC · JPL
725280	2008 VH_{10}	—	November 2, 2008	Kitt Peak	Spacewatch	·	1.2 km	MPC · JPL
725281	2008 VX_{10}	—	November 2, 2008	Mount Lemmon	Mount Lemmon Survey	·	1.6 km	MPC · JPL
725282	2008 VO_{11}	—	November 2, 2008	Mount Lemmon	Mount Lemmon Survey	·	670 m	MPC · JPL
725283	2008 VF_{12}	—	September 27, 2008	Mount Lemmon	Mount Lemmon Survey	·	1.0 km	MPC · JPL
725284	2008 VP_{24}	—	November 1, 2008	Kitt Peak	Spacewatch	KON	2.7 km	MPC · JPL
725285	2008 VX_{27}	—	November 2, 2008	Kitt Peak	Spacewatch	·	1.8 km	MPC · JPL
725286	2008 VC_{30}	—	October 25, 2008	Kitt Peak	Spacewatch	·	3.2 km	MPC · JPL
725287	2008 VL_{32}	—	April 25, 2007	Kitt Peak	Spacewatch	·	1.2 km	MPC · JPL
725288	2008 VY_{32}	—	November 2, 2008	Mount Lemmon	Mount Lemmon Survey	·	2.5 km	MPC · JPL
725289	2008 VK_{37}	—	November 2, 2008	Mount Lemmon	Mount Lemmon Survey	·	2.9 km	MPC · JPL
725290	2008 VV_{37}	—	September 27, 2008	Mount Lemmon	Mount Lemmon Survey	·	1.1 km	MPC · JPL
725291	2008 VU_{40}	—	October 26, 2008	Kitt Peak	Spacewatch	·	830 m	MPC · JPL
725292	2008 VM_{46}	—	October 20, 2008	Kitt Peak	Spacewatch	·	2.9 km	MPC · JPL
725293	2008 VL_{48}	—	November 3, 2008	Kitt Peak	Spacewatch	EOS	2.1 km	MPC · JPL
725294	2008 VB_{54}	—	November 6, 2008	Kitt Peak	Spacewatch	·	820 m	MPC · JPL
725295	2008 VD_{56}	—	November 6, 2008	Mount Lemmon	Mount Lemmon Survey	·	4.2 km	MPC · JPL
725296	2008 VF_{56}	—	November 6, 2008	Mount Lemmon	Mount Lemmon Survey	EOS	1.3 km	MPC · JPL
725297	2008 VV_{56}	—	November 6, 2008	Mount Lemmon	Mount Lemmon Survey	·	2.7 km	MPC · JPL
725298	2008 VM_{76}	—	November 1, 2008	Mount Lemmon	Mount Lemmon Survey	·	1.3 km	MPC · JPL
725299	2008 VF_{81}	—	September 24, 2008	Mount Lemmon	Mount Lemmon Survey	·	1.6 km	MPC · JPL
725300	2008 VU_{81}	—	November 7, 2008	Mount Lemmon	Mount Lemmon Survey	·	2.2 km	MPC · JPL

== 725301–725400 ==
back to top

Designation			Discovery			Properties		Ref
Permanent	Provisional	Named after	Date	Site	Discoverer(s)	Category	Diam.	Ref
725301	2008 VW_{82}	—	November 7, 2008	Mount Lemmon	Mount Lemmon Survey	·	2.5 km	MPC · JPL
725302	2008 VW_{83}	—	October 22, 2008	Kitt Peak	Spacewatch	·	2.7 km	MPC · JPL
725303	2008 VO_{84}	—	November 6, 2008	Mount Lemmon	Mount Lemmon Survey	·	1.1 km	MPC · JPL
725304	2008 VU_{84}	—	October 31, 2014	Mount Lemmon	Mount Lemmon Survey	VER	2.8 km	MPC · JPL
725305	2008 VX_{84}	—	November 6, 2008	Mount Lemmon	Mount Lemmon Survey	KOR	1.1 km	MPC · JPL
725306	2008 VW_{85}	—	November 18, 1995	Kitt Peak	Spacewatch	·	1.2 km	MPC · JPL
725307	2008 VZ_{85}	—	November 27, 2014	Haleakala	Pan-STARRS 1	·	1.8 km	MPC · JPL
725308	2008 VL_{86}	—	April 27, 2010	WISE	WISE	·	2.6 km	MPC · JPL
725309	2008 VM_{86}	—	November 3, 2008	Mount Lemmon	Mount Lemmon Survey	HNS	900 m	MPC · JPL
725310	2008 VP_{86}	—	September 23, 2012	Mount Lemmon	Mount Lemmon Survey	MAR	840 m	MPC · JPL
725311	2008 VM_{87}	—	April 7, 2010	WISE	WISE	·	3.6 km	MPC · JPL
725312	2008 VJ_{89}	—	October 5, 2014	Mount Lemmon	Mount Lemmon Survey	·	3.4 km	MPC · JPL
725313	2008 VV_{89}	—	November 3, 2008	Mount Lemmon	Mount Lemmon Survey	(21885)	2.5 km	MPC · JPL
725314	2008 VZ_{89}	—	April 28, 2017	Mount Lemmon	Mount Lemmon Survey	·	2.6 km	MPC · JPL
725315	2008 VB_{90}	—	April 20, 2017	Mount Lemmon	Mount Lemmon Survey	T_{j} (2.99) · EUP	3.2 km	MPC · JPL
725316	2008 VU_{90}	—	September 13, 2002	Palomar	NEAT	·	1.9 km	MPC · JPL
725317	2008 VY_{90}	—	March 17, 2016	Mount Lemmon	Mount Lemmon Survey	·	2.4 km	MPC · JPL
725318	2008 VE_{91}	—	November 6, 2008	Mount Lemmon	Mount Lemmon Survey	·	2.2 km	MPC · JPL
725319	2008 VF_{91}	—	November 21, 2017	Haleakala	Pan-STARRS 1	·	1.2 km	MPC · JPL
725320	2008 VJ_{91}	—	December 20, 2014	Haleakala	Pan-STARRS 1	·	3.0 km	MPC · JPL
725321	2008 VR_{91}	—	April 24, 2010	WISE	WISE	·	2.8 km	MPC · JPL
725322	2008 VK_{92}	—	October 11, 2012	Haleakala	Pan-STARRS 1	MAR	670 m	MPC · JPL
725323	2008 VW_{92}	—	May 16, 2010	WISE	WISE	·	1.0 km	MPC · JPL
725324	2008 VD_{93}	—	January 19, 2016	Haleakala	Pan-STARRS 1	·	2.5 km	MPC · JPL
725325	2008 VP_{94}	—	November 7, 2012	Mount Lemmon	Mount Lemmon Survey	·	990 m	MPC · JPL
725326	2008 VX_{94}	—	November 25, 2009	Mount Lemmon	Mount Lemmon Survey	L4	8.5 km	MPC · JPL
725327	2008 VC_{95}	—	February 20, 2014	Haleakala	Pan-STARRS 1	·	760 m	MPC · JPL
725328	2008 VQ_{95}	—	January 13, 2010	WISE	WISE	EUP	3.4 km	MPC · JPL
725329	2008 VR_{95}	—	March 13, 2016	Haleakala	Pan-STARRS 1	·	2.3 km	MPC · JPL
725330	2008 VB_{96}	—	November 26, 2014	Haleakala	Pan-STARRS 1	·	2.7 km	MPC · JPL
725331	2008 VS_{96}	—	November 1, 2008	Mount Lemmon	Mount Lemmon Survey	·	2.1 km	MPC · JPL
725332	2008 VY_{96}	—	January 30, 2004	Kitt Peak	Spacewatch	THM	1.9 km	MPC · JPL
725333	2008 VO_{98}	—	November 8, 2008	Kitt Peak	Spacewatch	·	570 m	MPC · JPL
725334	2008 VR_{98}	—	November 1, 2008	Mount Lemmon	Mount Lemmon Survey	·	1.0 km	MPC · JPL
725335	2008 VL_{99}	—	November 3, 2008	Kitt Peak	Spacewatch	·	1.8 km	MPC · JPL
725336	2008 VJ_{101}	—	November 1, 2008	Mount Lemmon	Mount Lemmon Survey	·	1.1 km	MPC · JPL
725337	2008 VN_{101}	—	November 1, 2008	Mount Lemmon	Mount Lemmon Survey	·	1.1 km	MPC · JPL
725338	2008 VH_{102}	—	November 2, 2008	Mount Lemmon	Mount Lemmon Survey	·	920 m	MPC · JPL
725339	2008 VF_{103}	—	November 6, 2008	Mount Lemmon	Mount Lemmon Survey	·	520 m	MPC · JPL
725340	2008 WK_{7}	—	October 27, 2008	Kitt Peak	Spacewatch	·	1.7 km	MPC · JPL
725341	2008 WU_{8}	—	March 15, 2007	Mount Lemmon	Mount Lemmon Survey	·	900 m	MPC · JPL
725342	2008 WQ_{9}	—	November 17, 2008	Kitt Peak	Spacewatch	·	2.3 km	MPC · JPL
725343	2008 WQ_{12}	—	November 18, 2008	Kitt Peak	Spacewatch	H	500 m	MPC · JPL
725344	2008 WV_{18}	—	October 8, 2008	Kitt Peak	Spacewatch	·	2.9 km	MPC · JPL
725345	2008 WZ_{26}	—	December 19, 2004	Mount Lemmon	Mount Lemmon Survey	·	1.3 km	MPC · JPL
725346	2008 WG_{29}	—	October 27, 2008	Mount Lemmon	Mount Lemmon Survey	·	2.8 km	MPC · JPL
725347	2008 WG_{30}	—	November 19, 2008	Mount Lemmon	Mount Lemmon Survey	·	1.8 km	MPC · JPL
725348	2008 WT_{31}	—	November 19, 2008	Mount Lemmon	Mount Lemmon Survey	NYS	980 m	MPC · JPL
725349	2008 WO_{33}	—	October 1, 2008	Mount Lemmon	Mount Lemmon Survey	·	1.1 km	MPC · JPL
725350	2008 WT_{33}	—	October 7, 2008	Kitt Peak	Spacewatch	THM	1.7 km	MPC · JPL
725351	2008 WM_{37}	—	November 17, 2008	Kitt Peak	Spacewatch	(5)	1.0 km	MPC · JPL
725352	2008 WX_{42}	—	October 3, 2008	Mount Lemmon	Mount Lemmon Survey	·	920 m	MPC · JPL
725353	2008 WX_{47}	—	November 6, 2008	Mount Lemmon	Mount Lemmon Survey	·	2.4 km	MPC · JPL
725354	2008 WJ_{49}	—	November 18, 2008	Kitt Peak	Spacewatch	·	2.7 km	MPC · JPL
725355	2008 WA_{51}	—	November 18, 2008	Kitt Peak	Spacewatch	VER	2.2 km	MPC · JPL
725356	2008 WE_{51}	—	October 27, 2008	Kitt Peak	Spacewatch	·	3.2 km	MPC · JPL
725357	2008 WJ_{53}	—	November 19, 2008	Kitt Peak	Spacewatch	THM	2.1 km	MPC · JPL
725358	2008 WH_{55}	—	November 20, 2008	Kitt Peak	Spacewatch	·	1.1 km	MPC · JPL
725359	2008 WV_{55}	—	November 1, 2008	Mount Lemmon	Mount Lemmon Survey	·	2.2 km	MPC · JPL
725360	2008 WW_{55}	—	September 26, 2003	Apache Point	SDSS Collaboration	AGN	970 m	MPC · JPL
725361	2008 WE_{57}	—	October 31, 2008	Kitt Peak	Spacewatch	(31811)	2.5 km	MPC · JPL
725362	2008 WB_{66}	—	September 20, 2008	Kitt Peak	Spacewatch	·	1.7 km	MPC · JPL
725363	2008 WA_{70}	—	November 18, 2008	Kitt Peak	Spacewatch	·	3.2 km	MPC · JPL
725364	2008 WP_{70}	—	November 18, 2008	Kitt Peak	Spacewatch	·	2.7 km	MPC · JPL
725365	2008 WK_{74}	—	November 19, 2008	Mount Lemmon	Mount Lemmon Survey	·	700 m	MPC · JPL
725366	2008 WV_{78}	—	November 20, 2008	Kitt Peak	Spacewatch	·	1.6 km	MPC · JPL
725367	2008 WQ_{79}	—	March 8, 2005	Mount Lemmon	Mount Lemmon Survey	·	2.6 km	MPC · JPL
725368	2008 WT_{82}	—	November 20, 2008	Kitt Peak	Spacewatch	·	790 m	MPC · JPL
725369	2008 WZ_{84}	—	November 20, 2008	Kitt Peak	Spacewatch	EOS	1.7 km	MPC · JPL
725370	2008 WR_{89}	—	November 22, 2008	Kitt Peak	Spacewatch	·	3.4 km	MPC · JPL
725371	2008 WZ_{90}	—	October 21, 2003	Kitt Peak	Spacewatch	·	1.4 km	MPC · JPL
725372	2008 WM_{100}	—	November 24, 2008	Mount Lemmon	Mount Lemmon Survey	·	2.5 km	MPC · JPL
725373	2008 WK_{102}	—	October 31, 2008	Kitt Peak	Spacewatch	·	1.1 km	MPC · JPL
725374	2008 WW_{103}	—	October 6, 2008	Mount Lemmon	Mount Lemmon Survey	·	2.6 km	MPC · JPL
725375	2008 WD_{107}	—	November 30, 2008	Kitt Peak	Spacewatch	·	2.5 km	MPC · JPL
725376	2008 WJ_{111}	—	October 30, 2008	Kitt Peak	Spacewatch	·	3.0 km	MPC · JPL
725377	2008 WP_{114}	—	October 30, 2008	Kitt Peak	Spacewatch	·	2.5 km	MPC · JPL
725378	2008 WH_{115}	—	November 30, 2008	Mount Lemmon	Mount Lemmon Survey	·	1.0 km	MPC · JPL
725379	2008 WU_{118}	—	November 21, 2008	Kitt Peak	Spacewatch	·	2.9 km	MPC · JPL
725380	2008 WW_{121}	—	November 19, 2008	Kitt Peak	Spacewatch	·	2.5 km	MPC · JPL
725381	2008 WN_{127}	—	October 2, 2008	Mount Lemmon	Mount Lemmon Survey	·	2.7 km	MPC · JPL
725382	2008 WK_{128}	—	November 21, 2008	Kitt Peak	Spacewatch	·	2.0 km	MPC · JPL
725383	2008 WM_{128}	—	October 13, 2007	Mount Lemmon	Mount Lemmon Survey	3:2	4.5 km	MPC · JPL
725384	2008 WH_{130}	—	November 21, 2008	Kitt Peak	Spacewatch	THM	2.1 km	MPC · JPL
725385	2008 WR_{136}	—	November 20, 2008	Socorro	LINEAR	·	1.3 km	MPC · JPL
725386	2008 WN_{142}	—	September 23, 2011	Haleakala	Pan-STARRS 1	·	600 m	MPC · JPL
725387	2008 WD_{145}	—	November 17, 2008	Kitt Peak	Spacewatch	·	3.1 km	MPC · JPL
725388	2008 WG_{145}	—	November 19, 2008	Kitt Peak	Spacewatch	·	3.0 km	MPC · JPL
725389	2008 WP_{145}	—	November 24, 2008	Mount Lemmon	Mount Lemmon Survey	·	3.1 km	MPC · JPL
725390	2008 WW_{145}	—	April 6, 2011	Mount Lemmon	Mount Lemmon Survey	VER	2.4 km	MPC · JPL
725391	2008 WY_{145}	—	November 18, 2008	Kitt Peak	Spacewatch	·	2.2 km	MPC · JPL
725392	2008 WD_{146}	—	February 27, 2014	Kitt Peak	Spacewatch	·	960 m	MPC · JPL
725393	2008 WS_{146}	—	November 21, 2008	Kitt Peak	Spacewatch	·	980 m	MPC · JPL
725394	2008 WF_{147}	—	January 28, 2014	Kitt Peak	Spacewatch	·	1.0 km	MPC · JPL
725395	2008 WK_{147}	—	November 18, 2008	Kitt Peak	Spacewatch	·	4.8 km	MPC · JPL
725396	2008 WV_{148}	—	November 19, 2008	Kitt Peak	Spacewatch	·	1.2 km	MPC · JPL
725397	2008 WC_{149}	—	April 1, 2011	Mount Lemmon	Mount Lemmon Survey	·	3.1 km	MPC · JPL
725398	2008 WF_{149}	—	October 25, 2016	Mount Lemmon	Mount Lemmon Survey	H	480 m	MPC · JPL
725399	2008 WL_{149}	—	November 21, 2008	Mount Lemmon	Mount Lemmon Survey	·	830 m	MPC · JPL
725400	2008 WM_{149}	—	January 18, 2010	WISE	WISE	·	1.5 km	MPC · JPL

== 725401–725500 ==
back to top

Designation			Discovery			Properties		Ref
Permanent	Provisional	Named after	Date	Site	Discoverer(s)	Category	Diam.	Ref
725401	2008 WP_{149}	—	January 11, 2018	Haleakala	Pan-STARRS 1	·	1.1 km	MPC · JPL
725402	2008 WQ_{149}	—	November 21, 2008	Mount Lemmon	Mount Lemmon Survey	·	2.7 km	MPC · JPL
725403	2008 WV_{149}	—	April 25, 2015	Haleakala	Pan-STARRS 1	·	860 m	MPC · JPL
725404	2008 WZ_{149}	—	April 25, 2010	WISE	WISE	·	2.6 km	MPC · JPL
725405	2008 WP_{150}	—	October 7, 2012	Haleakala	Pan-STARRS 1	·	1.3 km	MPC · JPL
725406	2008 WN_{152}	—	April 29, 2010	WISE	WISE	·	1.7 km	MPC · JPL
725407	2008 WC_{153}	—	September 27, 2016	Haleakala	Pan-STARRS 1	·	1.0 km	MPC · JPL
725408	2008 WG_{153}	—	November 19, 2008	Kitt Peak	Spacewatch	·	950 m	MPC · JPL
725409	2008 WU_{153}	—	April 4, 2011	Mount Lemmon	Mount Lemmon Survey	·	2.4 km	MPC · JPL
725410	2008 WA_{154}	—	September 22, 2016	Mount Lemmon	Mount Lemmon Survey	(5)	910 m	MPC · JPL
725411	2008 WV_{154}	—	November 20, 2008	Mount Lemmon	Mount Lemmon Survey	·	2.3 km	MPC · JPL
725412	2008 WE_{155}	—	October 5, 2016	Mount Lemmon	Mount Lemmon Survey	·	850 m	MPC · JPL
725413	2008 WK_{155}	—	February 11, 2016	Haleakala	Pan-STARRS 1	·	2.0 km	MPC · JPL
725414	2008 WK_{156}	—	November 30, 2008	Mount Lemmon	Mount Lemmon Survey	·	2.7 km	MPC · JPL
725415	2008 WL_{156}	—	November 24, 2008	Kitt Peak	Spacewatch	·	3.4 km	MPC · JPL
725416	2008 WH_{157}	—	November 21, 2008	Kitt Peak	Spacewatch	·	1.5 km	MPC · JPL
725417	2008 WK_{158}	—	November 19, 2008	Mount Lemmon	Mount Lemmon Survey	·	1.1 km	MPC · JPL
725418	2008 WQ_{158}	—	November 20, 2008	Kitt Peak	Spacewatch	·	2.3 km	MPC · JPL
725419	2008 WX_{158}	—	November 22, 2008	Mount Lemmon	Mount Lemmon Survey	·	2.6 km	MPC · JPL
725420	2008 WQ_{159}	—	November 20, 2008	Mount Lemmon	Mount Lemmon Survey	·	3.4 km	MPC · JPL
725421	2008 WU_{162}	—	November 18, 2008	Kitt Peak	Spacewatch	·	1.1 km	MPC · JPL
725422	2008 WW_{162}	—	November 24, 2008	Mount Lemmon	Mount Lemmon Survey	HNS	860 m	MPC · JPL
725423	2008 XP_{8}	—	June 8, 2005	Kitt Peak	Spacewatch	·	3.2 km	MPC · JPL
725424	2008 XM_{9}	—	November 7, 2008	Mount Lemmon	Mount Lemmon Survey	·	940 m	MPC · JPL
725425	2008 XG_{10}	—	December 2, 2008	Kitt Peak	Spacewatch	·	2.1 km	MPC · JPL
725426	2008 XZ_{11}	—	September 4, 2007	Mount Lemmon	Mount Lemmon Survey	·	2.0 km	MPC · JPL
725427	2008 XC_{12}	—	May 23, 1998	Kitt Peak	Spacewatch	·	1.4 km	MPC · JPL
725428	2008 XN_{18}	—	December 1, 2008	Kitt Peak	Spacewatch	·	2.3 km	MPC · JPL
725429	2008 XV_{19}	—	December 1, 2008	Mount Lemmon	Mount Lemmon Survey	·	2.0 km	MPC · JPL
725430	2008 XL_{23}	—	October 25, 2008	Kitt Peak	Spacewatch	·	1.7 km	MPC · JPL
725431	2008 XS_{23}	—	November 7, 2008	Kitt Peak	Spacewatch	·	3.3 km	MPC · JPL
725432	2008 XA_{25}	—	December 4, 2008	Mount Lemmon	Mount Lemmon Survey	EOS	1.8 km	MPC · JPL
725433	2008 XP_{26}	—	October 31, 2008	Kitt Peak	Spacewatch	EOS	1.5 km	MPC · JPL
725434	2008 XV_{27}	—	October 25, 2008	Kitt Peak	Spacewatch	·	1.3 km	MPC · JPL
725435	2008 XV_{32}	—	October 25, 2008	Kitt Peak	Spacewatch	·	1.1 km	MPC · JPL
725436	2008 XU_{33}	—	December 2, 2008	Kitt Peak	Spacewatch	·	2.0 km	MPC · JPL
725437	2008 XA_{34}	—	November 6, 2008	Kitt Peak	Spacewatch	(5)	800 m	MPC · JPL
725438	2008 XS_{37}	—	December 2, 2008	Kitt Peak	Spacewatch	·	2.4 km	MPC · JPL
725439	2008 XJ_{38}	—	December 2, 2008	Kitt Peak	Spacewatch	CLA	1.7 km	MPC · JPL
725440	2008 XK_{39}	—	September 18, 2001	Apache Point	SDSS Collaboration	·	3.1 km	MPC · JPL
725441	2008 XM_{40}	—	December 2, 2008	Kitt Peak	Spacewatch	·	2.7 km	MPC · JPL
725442	2008 XM_{46}	—	April 4, 2002	Kitt Peak	Spacewatch	·	1.2 km	MPC · JPL
725443	2008 XB_{51}	—	November 24, 2008	Kitt Peak	Spacewatch	LIX	3.0 km	MPC · JPL
725444	2008 XX_{57}	—	May 20, 2012	Mount Lemmon	Mount Lemmon Survey	·	3.5 km	MPC · JPL
725445	2008 XZ_{57}	—	January 13, 2016	Haleakala	Pan-STARRS 1	·	2.9 km	MPC · JPL
725446	2008 XM_{58}	—	October 26, 2013	Catalina	CSS	·	3.0 km	MPC · JPL
725447	2008 XQ_{58}	—	May 24, 2011	Haleakala	Pan-STARRS 1	·	920 m	MPC · JPL
725448	2008 XA_{59}	—	April 29, 2011	Mount Lemmon	Mount Lemmon Survey	·	1.1 km	MPC · JPL
725449	2008 XO_{59}	—	December 3, 2008	Kitt Peak	Spacewatch	·	3.6 km	MPC · JPL
725450	2008 XP_{59}	—	December 4, 2008	Mount Lemmon	Mount Lemmon Survey	·	1.2 km	MPC · JPL
725451	2008 XR_{59}	—	December 2, 2008	Mount Lemmon	Mount Lemmon Survey	·	940 m	MPC · JPL
725452	2008 XD_{60}	—	June 17, 2010	WISE	WISE	KON	1.7 km	MPC · JPL
725453	2008 XK_{60}	—	December 2, 2008	Mount Lemmon	Mount Lemmon Survey	·	3.1 km	MPC · JPL
725454	2008 XB_{61}	—	November 24, 2008	Kitt Peak	Spacewatch	·	4.1 km	MPC · JPL
725455	2008 XW_{61}	—	December 5, 2008	Kitt Peak	Spacewatch	·	3.5 km	MPC · JPL
725456	2008 XX_{61}	—	April 14, 2011	Mount Lemmon	Mount Lemmon Survey	URS	2.5 km	MPC · JPL
725457	2008 XZ_{61}	—	October 20, 2012	Haleakala	Pan-STARRS 1	·	1.5 km	MPC · JPL
725458	2008 XU_{62}	—	October 1, 2011	Bergisch Gladbach	W. Bickel	V	440 m	MPC · JPL
725459	2008 XX_{62}	—	December 2, 2008	Mount Lemmon	Mount Lemmon Survey	·	1.5 km	MPC · JPL
725460	2008 XM_{63}	—	January 17, 2010	WISE	WISE	·	1.4 km	MPC · JPL
725461	2008 XH_{64}	—	January 12, 2010	WISE	WISE	·	1.6 km	MPC · JPL
725462	2008 XY_{64}	—	April 12, 2018	Haleakala	Pan-STARRS 1	·	1.2 km	MPC · JPL
725463	2008 XX_{65}	—	December 1, 2008	Kitt Peak	Spacewatch	·	1.4 km	MPC · JPL
725464	2008 XY_{65}	—	December 5, 2008	Kitt Peak	Spacewatch	·	2.2 km	MPC · JPL
725465	2008 XF_{68}	—	December 3, 2008	Mount Lemmon	Mount Lemmon Survey	·	960 m	MPC · JPL
725466	2008 XV_{68}	—	December 3, 2008	Catalina	CSS	·	1.0 km	MPC · JPL
725467	2008 YZ_{3}	—	December 22, 2008	Calar Alto	F. Hormuth	·	1.1 km	MPC · JPL
725468	2008 YS_{6}	—	December 22, 2008	Dauban	C. Rinner, Kugel, F.	·	2.6 km	MPC · JPL
725469	2008 YH_{10}	—	December 20, 2008	Mount Lemmon	Mount Lemmon Survey	·	970 m	MPC · JPL
725470	2008 YC_{11}	—	December 20, 2008	Mount Lemmon	Mount Lemmon Survey	BRA	1.4 km	MPC · JPL
725471	2008 YQ_{12}	—	December 21, 2008	Mount Lemmon	Mount Lemmon Survey	·	3.0 km	MPC · JPL
725472	2008 YE_{13}	—	December 21, 2008	Kitt Peak	Spacewatch	·	1.3 km	MPC · JPL
725473	2008 YP_{19}	—	December 21, 2008	Mount Lemmon	Mount Lemmon Survey	·	1.8 km	MPC · JPL
725474	2008 YC_{22}	—	December 21, 2008	Mount Lemmon	Mount Lemmon Survey	(1298)	2.3 km	MPC · JPL
725475	2008 YK_{26}	—	December 23, 2008	Dauban	C. Rinner, Kugel, F.	VER	2.6 km	MPC · JPL
725476	2008 YO_{37}	—	December 22, 2008	Kitt Peak	Spacewatch	MAS	560 m	MPC · JPL
725477	2008 YG_{39}	—	December 29, 2008	Mount Lemmon	Mount Lemmon Survey	·	620 m	MPC · JPL
725478	2008 YR_{39}	—	December 29, 2008	Mount Lemmon	Mount Lemmon Survey	(31811)	1.9 km	MPC · JPL
725479	2008 YN_{41}	—	November 7, 2008	Mount Lemmon	Mount Lemmon Survey	·	2.6 km	MPC · JPL
725480	2008 YK_{43}	—	November 21, 2008	Kitt Peak	Spacewatch	·	3.7 km	MPC · JPL
725481	2008 YZ_{45}	—	December 29, 2008	Mount Lemmon	Mount Lemmon Survey	·	1.3 km	MPC · JPL
725482	2008 YQ_{49}	—	December 29, 2008	Mount Lemmon	Mount Lemmon Survey	·	730 m	MPC · JPL
725483	2008 YN_{50}	—	December 29, 2008	Mount Lemmon	Mount Lemmon Survey	·	1.5 km	MPC · JPL
725484	2008 YJ_{55}	—	December 29, 2008	Mount Lemmon	Mount Lemmon Survey	THB	2.7 km	MPC · JPL
725485	2008 YQ_{56}	—	January 7, 2005	Campo Imperatore	CINEOS	·	1.4 km	MPC · JPL
725486	2008 YQ_{58}	—	December 30, 2008	Kitt Peak	Spacewatch	EOS	1.4 km	MPC · JPL
725487	2008 YZ_{59}	—	April 24, 2006	Kitt Peak	Spacewatch	·	1.3 km	MPC · JPL
725488	2008 YC_{66}	—	December 25, 2008	Pla D'Arguines	R. Ferrando, Ferrando, M.	·	2.2 km	MPC · JPL
725489	2008 YG_{66}	—	October 10, 2007	Goodricke-Pigott	R. A. Tucker	·	6.0 km	MPC · JPL
725490	2008 YK_{69}	—	November 19, 2008	Mount Lemmon	Mount Lemmon Survey	·	2.6 km	MPC · JPL
725491	2008 YP_{72}	—	November 19, 2008	Kitt Peak	Spacewatch	·	2.9 km	MPC · JPL
725492	2008 YW_{72}	—	December 30, 2008	Kitt Peak	Spacewatch	·	2.1 km	MPC · JPL
725493	2008 YG_{73}	—	December 22, 2008	Kitt Peak	Spacewatch	·	2.6 km	MPC · JPL
725494	2008 YN_{75}	—	September 28, 2003	Kitt Peak	Spacewatch	·	1.1 km	MPC · JPL
725495	2008 YY_{76}	—	October 5, 2003	Kitt Peak	Spacewatch	(5)	1.2 km	MPC · JPL
725496	2008 YB_{79}	—	December 30, 2008	Mount Lemmon	Mount Lemmon Survey	·	1.5 km	MPC · JPL
725497	2008 YP_{81}	—	December 31, 2008	Kitt Peak	Spacewatch	·	1.2 km	MPC · JPL
725498	2008 YF_{87}	—	December 29, 2008	Kitt Peak	Spacewatch	·	870 m	MPC · JPL
725499	2008 YC_{88}	—	December 21, 2008	Kitt Peak	Spacewatch	·	1.2 km	MPC · JPL
725500	2008 YL_{90}	—	December 29, 2008	Kitt Peak	Spacewatch	·	4.0 km	MPC · JPL

== 725501–725600 ==
back to top

Designation			Discovery			Properties		Ref
Permanent	Provisional	Named after	Date	Site	Discoverer(s)	Category	Diam.	Ref
725501	2008 YH_{92}	—	December 29, 2008	Kitt Peak	Spacewatch	·	2.4 km	MPC · JPL
725502	2008 YU_{95}	—	December 29, 2008	Kitt Peak	Spacewatch	·	930 m	MPC · JPL
725503	2008 YB_{97}	—	October 8, 2007	Mount Lemmon	Mount Lemmon Survey	·	1.2 km	MPC · JPL
725504	2008 YF_{98}	—	September 11, 2007	Mount Lemmon	Mount Lemmon Survey	·	1.2 km	MPC · JPL
725505	2008 YT_{104}	—	December 22, 2008	Kitt Peak	Spacewatch	·	1.3 km	MPC · JPL
725506	2008 YK_{106}	—	December 29, 2008	Kitt Peak	Spacewatch	·	700 m	MPC · JPL
725507	2008 YA_{107}	—	December 22, 2008	Kitt Peak	Spacewatch	·	1.3 km	MPC · JPL
725508	2008 YH_{107}	—	December 29, 2008	Kitt Peak	Spacewatch	·	2.5 km	MPC · JPL
725509	2008 YO_{115}	—	December 21, 2008	Kitt Peak	Spacewatch	·	2.2 km	MPC · JPL
725510	2008 YP_{115}	—	December 21, 2008	Kitt Peak	Spacewatch	MAR	1.0 km	MPC · JPL
725511	2008 YM_{122}	—	December 22, 2008	Kitt Peak	Spacewatch	·	1.5 km	MPC · JPL
725512	2008 YT_{124}	—	December 30, 2008	Kitt Peak	Spacewatch	·	560 m	MPC · JPL
725513	2008 YV_{125}	—	December 30, 2008	Kitt Peak	Spacewatch	MAR	760 m	MPC · JPL
725514	2008 YW_{137}	—	December 22, 2008	Mount Lemmon	Mount Lemmon Survey	·	2.6 km	MPC · JPL
725515	2008 YV_{139}	—	December 30, 2008	Kitt Peak	Spacewatch	EMA	2.5 km	MPC · JPL
725516	2008 YX_{142}	—	December 22, 2008	Kitt Peak	Spacewatch	VER	2.5 km	MPC · JPL
725517	2008 YN_{143}	—	December 22, 2008	Mount Lemmon	Mount Lemmon Survey	·	2.5 km	MPC · JPL
725518	2008 YV_{147}	—	December 31, 2008	Kitt Peak	Spacewatch	TIR	3.0 km	MPC · JPL
725519	2008 YR_{149}	—	October 29, 2003	Kitt Peak	Spacewatch	·	2.0 km	MPC · JPL
725520	2008 YA_{150}	—	December 21, 2008	Mount Lemmon	Mount Lemmon Survey	·	1.3 km	MPC · JPL
725521	2008 YF_{157}	—	December 29, 2008	Mount Lemmon	Mount Lemmon Survey	·	520 m	MPC · JPL
725522	2008 YQ_{162}	—	December 22, 2008	Mount Lemmon	Mount Lemmon Survey	·	2.5 km	MPC · JPL
725523	2008 YE_{163}	—	May 14, 2005	Kitt Peak	Spacewatch	·	3.8 km	MPC · JPL
725524	2008 YP_{169}	—	December 30, 2008	Mount Lemmon	Mount Lemmon Survey	V	460 m	MPC · JPL
725525	2008 YT_{170}	—	August 24, 1995	La Silla	C.-I. Lagerkvist	·	1.6 km	MPC · JPL
725526	2008 YJ_{176}	—	October 21, 2012	Mount Lemmon	Mount Lemmon Survey	·	1.1 km	MPC · JPL
725527	2008 YK_{176}	—	July 22, 2011	Haleakala	Pan-STARRS 1	MAS	660 m	MPC · JPL
725528	2008 YF_{177}	—	December 22, 2008	Mount Lemmon	Mount Lemmon Survey	·	3.6 km	MPC · JPL
725529	2008 YQ_{177}	—	December 30, 2008	Mount Lemmon	Mount Lemmon Survey	·	500 m	MPC · JPL
725530	2008 YH_{178}	—	March 25, 2014	Mount Lemmon	Mount Lemmon Survey	·	1.3 km	MPC · JPL
725531	2008 YK_{178}	—	March 31, 2010	WISE	WISE	·	3.3 km	MPC · JPL
725532	2008 YR_{178}	—	April 10, 2014	Haleakala	Pan-STARRS 1	·	1.2 km	MPC · JPL
725533	2008 YT_{178}	—	November 26, 2014	Haleakala	Pan-STARRS 1	URS	2.9 km	MPC · JPL
725534	2008 YN_{179}	—	December 30, 2008	Mount Lemmon	Mount Lemmon Survey	·	1.9 km	MPC · JPL
725535	2008 YS_{179}	—	November 27, 2013	Haleakala	Pan-STARRS 1	·	2.1 km	MPC · JPL
725536	2008 YR_{180}	—	December 6, 2008	Kitt Peak	Spacewatch	·	850 m	MPC · JPL
725537	2008 YP_{182}	—	December 30, 2008	Kitt Peak	Spacewatch	·	2.7 km	MPC · JPL
725538	2008 YE_{185}	—	May 22, 2015	Haleakala	Pan-STARRS 1	·	1.2 km	MPC · JPL
725539	2008 YF_{185}	—	October 14, 2012	Kitt Peak	Spacewatch	·	1.1 km	MPC · JPL
725540	2008 YK_{185}	—	December 29, 2008	Mount Lemmon	Mount Lemmon Survey	·	2.2 km	MPC · JPL
725541	2008 YQ_{186}	—	December 31, 2008	Kitt Peak	Spacewatch	·	1.2 km	MPC · JPL
725542	2008 YK_{187}	—	December 22, 2008	Kitt Peak	Spacewatch	·	790 m	MPC · JPL
725543	2008 YB_{189}	—	December 22, 2008	Kitt Peak	Spacewatch	·	1.5 km	MPC · JPL
725544	2008 YK_{189}	—	December 22, 2008	Kitt Peak	Spacewatch	·	980 m	MPC · JPL
725545	2008 YL_{191}	—	December 22, 2008	Kitt Peak	Spacewatch	·	960 m	MPC · JPL
725546	2008 YE_{192}	—	December 18, 2004	Mount Lemmon	Mount Lemmon Survey	·	1.1 km	MPC · JPL
725547	2008 YW_{192}	—	December 30, 2008	Mount Lemmon	Mount Lemmon Survey	·	2.8 km	MPC · JPL
725548	2008 YM_{195}	—	December 29, 2008	Kitt Peak	Spacewatch	(31811)	2.4 km	MPC · JPL
725549	2009 AF_{2}	—	January 1, 2009	Vail-Jarnac	Jarnac	ARM	4.0 km	MPC · JPL
725550	2009 AL_{4}	—	December 22, 2008	Kitt Peak	Spacewatch	·	2.4 km	MPC · JPL
725551	2009 AM_{6}	—	January 1, 2009	Kitt Peak	Spacewatch	·	1.4 km	MPC · JPL
725552	2009 AB_{7}	—	November 7, 2008	Mount Lemmon	Mount Lemmon Survey	·	2.5 km	MPC · JPL
725553	2009 AZ_{7}	—	November 2, 2007	Mount Lemmon	Mount Lemmon Survey	TIR	2.7 km	MPC · JPL
725554	2009 AS_{8}	—	January 1, 2009	Kitt Peak	Spacewatch	·	1.0 km	MPC · JPL
725555	2009 AY_{8}	—	October 28, 2008	Kitt Peak	Spacewatch	·	3.2 km	MPC · JPL
725556	2009 AP_{22}	—	January 3, 2009	Kitt Peak	Spacewatch	·	980 m	MPC · JPL
725557	2009 AN_{26}	—	January 2, 2009	Kitt Peak	Spacewatch	EOS	1.6 km	MPC · JPL
725558	2009 AO_{31}	—	January 15, 2009	Kitt Peak	Spacewatch	·	1.1 km	MPC · JPL
725559	2009 AF_{33}	—	December 30, 2008	Mount Lemmon	Mount Lemmon Survey	·	1.7 km	MPC · JPL
725560	2009 AX_{34}	—	December 1, 2008	Kitt Peak	Spacewatch	·	3.1 km	MPC · JPL
725561	2009 AL_{39}	—	December 31, 2008	Kitt Peak	Spacewatch	·	2.3 km	MPC · JPL
725562	2009 AO_{52}	—	January 7, 2009	Kitt Peak	Spacewatch	·	1.4 km	MPC · JPL
725563	2009 AZ_{53}	—	January 2, 2009	Mount Lemmon	Mount Lemmon Survey	·	1.2 km	MPC · JPL
725564	2009 AL_{55}	—	January 1, 2009	Kitt Peak	Spacewatch	·	1.4 km	MPC · JPL
725565	2009 AN_{55}	—	January 2, 2009	Mount Lemmon	Mount Lemmon Survey	RAF	840 m	MPC · JPL
725566	2009 AQ_{56}	—	November 28, 2013	Kitt Peak	Spacewatch	·	2.0 km	MPC · JPL
725567	2009 AR_{56}	—	September 13, 2007	Catalina	CSS	·	1.9 km	MPC · JPL
725568	2009 AS_{56}	—	June 28, 2010	WISE	WISE	EUP	3.8 km	MPC · JPL
725569	2009 AH_{57}	—	April 5, 2014	Haleakala	Pan-STARRS 1	·	990 m	MPC · JPL
725570	2009 AY_{57}	—	December 3, 2008	Mount Lemmon	Mount Lemmon Survey	·	2.4 km	MPC · JPL
725571	2009 AF_{58}	—	November 22, 2017	Haleakala	Pan-STARRS 1	ADE	1.5 km	MPC · JPL
725572	2009 AP_{59}	—	January 3, 2009	Mount Lemmon	Mount Lemmon Survey	·	1.9 km	MPC · JPL
725573	2009 AJ_{61}	—	January 3, 2009	Mount Lemmon	Mount Lemmon Survey	·	1.1 km	MPC · JPL
725574	2009 AJ_{62}	—	January 1, 2009	Kitt Peak	Spacewatch	KON	2.0 km	MPC · JPL
725575	2009 AW_{64}	—	January 2, 2009	Mount Lemmon	Mount Lemmon Survey	AGN	900 m	MPC · JPL
725576	2009 AZ_{64}	—	January 3, 2009	Kitt Peak	Spacewatch	·	1.0 km	MPC · JPL
725577	2009 AN_{65}	—	January 2, 2009	Kitt Peak	Spacewatch	·	960 m	MPC · JPL
725578	2009 AV_{65}	—	January 2, 2009	Kitt Peak	Spacewatch	EOS	1.5 km	MPC · JPL
725579	2009 AX_{65}	—	January 1, 2009	Kitt Peak	Spacewatch	EOS	1.5 km	MPC · JPL
725580	2009 BR	—	January 16, 2009	Calar Alto	F. Hormuth	·	540 m	MPC · JPL
725581	2009 BF_{3}	—	December 30, 2008	XuYi	PMO NEO Survey Program	T_{j} (2.99)	5.2 km	MPC · JPL
725582	2009 BG_{4}	—	October 24, 2008	Mount Lemmon	Mount Lemmon Survey	·	4.2 km	MPC · JPL
725583	2009 BA_{6}	—	November 24, 2008	Catalina	CSS	·	2.9 km	MPC · JPL
725584	2009 BG_{12}	—	November 30, 2008	Kitt Peak	Spacewatch	·	3.3 km	MPC · JPL
725585	2009 BQ_{15}	—	January 2, 2009	Mount Lemmon	Mount Lemmon Survey	·	1.6 km	MPC · JPL
725586	2009 BO_{20}	—	December 29, 2008	Kitt Peak	Spacewatch	·	2.9 km	MPC · JPL
725587	2009 BV_{33}	—	January 2, 2009	Mount Lemmon	Mount Lemmon Survey	LIX	3.0 km	MPC · JPL
725588	2009 BV_{35}	—	January 1, 2009	Mount Lemmon	Mount Lemmon Survey	·	3.4 km	MPC · JPL
725589	2009 BX_{35}	—	January 16, 2009	Kitt Peak	Spacewatch	VER	2.1 km	MPC · JPL
725590	2009 BD_{39}	—	January 16, 2009	Kitt Peak	Spacewatch	·	520 m	MPC · JPL
725591	2009 BN_{39}	—	January 16, 2009	Kitt Peak	Spacewatch	·	2.7 km	MPC · JPL
725592	2009 BY_{39}	—	October 24, 2003	Apache Point	SDSS Collaboration	KON	2.1 km	MPC · JPL
725593	2009 BP_{41}	—	January 16, 2009	Kitt Peak	Spacewatch	·	2.4 km	MPC · JPL
725594	2009 BU_{42}	—	January 16, 2009	Kitt Peak	Spacewatch	VER	2.0 km	MPC · JPL
725595	2009 BF_{46}	—	January 16, 2009	Kitt Peak	Spacewatch	EUN	860 m	MPC · JPL
725596	2009 BG_{54}	—	January 1, 2009	Mount Lemmon	Mount Lemmon Survey	·	3.1 km	MPC · JPL
725597	2009 BF_{61}	—	January 18, 2009	Catalina	CSS	·	940 m	MPC · JPL
725598	2009 BR_{71}	—	January 25, 2009	Kitt Peak	Spacewatch	·	3.4 km	MPC · JPL
725599	2009 BO_{72}	—	October 9, 2007	Kitt Peak	Spacewatch	·	2.2 km	MPC · JPL
725600	2009 BS_{73}	—	November 24, 2008	Mount Lemmon	Mount Lemmon Survey	H	630 m	MPC · JPL

== 725601–725700 ==
back to top

Designation			Discovery			Properties		Ref
Permanent	Provisional	Named after	Date	Site	Discoverer(s)	Category	Diam.	Ref
725601	2009 BX_{76}	—	April 11, 2002	Palomar	NEAT	·	1.4 km	MPC · JPL
725602	2009 BC_{81}	—	January 31, 2009	Cerro Burek	J. L. Ortiz, I. de la Cueva	H	500 m	MPC · JPL
725603	2009 BY_{95}	—	January 1, 2009	Kitt Peak	Spacewatch	·	1.2 km	MPC · JPL
725604	2009 BZ_{96}	—	January 25, 2009	Kitt Peak	Spacewatch	·	2.3 km	MPC · JPL
725605	2009 BU_{102}	—	January 30, 2009	Mount Lemmon	Mount Lemmon Survey	·	2.9 km	MPC · JPL
725606	2009 BT_{103}	—	January 25, 2009	Kitt Peak	Spacewatch	·	470 m	MPC · JPL
725607	2009 BH_{105}	—	January 20, 2009	Kitt Peak	Spacewatch	·	2.8 km	MPC · JPL
725608	2009 BJ_{108}	—	January 29, 2009	Mount Lemmon	Mount Lemmon Survey	·	570 m	MPC · JPL
725609	2009 BH_{109}	—	January 20, 2009	Mount Lemmon	Mount Lemmon Survey	·	1.6 km	MPC · JPL
725610	2009 BE_{111}	—	November 24, 2008	Mount Lemmon	Mount Lemmon Survey	·	3.3 km	MPC · JPL
725611	2009 BK_{114}	—	January 26, 2009	Kitt Peak	Spacewatch	·	1.4 km	MPC · JPL
725612	2009 BT_{115}	—	December 31, 2008	Mount Lemmon	Mount Lemmon Survey	·	3.4 km	MPC · JPL
725613	2009 BW_{116}	—	October 29, 2008	Kitt Peak	Spacewatch	·	2.1 km	MPC · JPL
725614	2009 BD_{127}	—	January 29, 2009	Kitt Peak	Spacewatch	·	1.3 km	MPC · JPL
725615	2009 BK_{136}	—	January 13, 1996	Kitt Peak	Spacewatch	·	1.2 km	MPC · JPL
725616	2009 BB_{137}	—	January 29, 2009	Kitt Peak	Spacewatch	·	2.3 km	MPC · JPL
725617	2009 BY_{139}	—	January 29, 2009	Kitt Peak	Spacewatch	·	2.3 km	MPC · JPL
725618	2009 BS_{143}	—	January 30, 2009	Kitt Peak	Spacewatch	·	1.5 km	MPC · JPL
725619	2009 BU_{143}	—	January 30, 2009	Kitt Peak	Spacewatch	·	2.1 km	MPC · JPL
725620	2009 BP_{144}	—	January 16, 2009	Kitt Peak	Spacewatch	VER	2.4 km	MPC · JPL
725621	2009 BL_{145}	—	January 30, 2009	Kitt Peak	Spacewatch	·	1.2 km	MPC · JPL
725622	2009 BU_{145}	—	January 20, 2009	Kitt Peak	Spacewatch	·	1.2 km	MPC · JPL
725623	2009 BV_{145}	—	January 30, 2009	Kitt Peak	Spacewatch	THM	2.0 km	MPC · JPL
725624	2009 BA_{148}	—	January 30, 2009	Mount Lemmon	Mount Lemmon Survey	·	2.4 km	MPC · JPL
725625	2009 BQ_{150}	—	January 27, 2009	XuYi	PMO NEO Survey Program	·	550 m	MPC · JPL
725626	2009 BU_{155}	—	January 16, 2009	Mount Lemmon	Mount Lemmon Survey	·	620 m	MPC · JPL
725627	2009 BS_{162}	—	January 31, 2009	Kitt Peak	Spacewatch	·	1.4 km	MPC · JPL
725628	2009 BM_{163}	—	January 31, 2009	Kitt Peak	Spacewatch	·	1.1 km	MPC · JPL
725629	2009 BU_{164}	—	October 12, 2007	Kitt Peak	Spacewatch	AGN	830 m	MPC · JPL
725630	2009 BD_{165}	—	January 31, 2009	Kitt Peak	Spacewatch	·	3.3 km	MPC · JPL
725631	2009 BM_{166}	—	January 31, 2009	Mount Lemmon	Mount Lemmon Survey	EUN	880 m	MPC · JPL
725632	2009 BE_{168}	—	February 1, 2009	Mount Lemmon	Mount Lemmon Survey	·	2.4 km	MPC · JPL
725633	2009 BQ_{168}	—	February 1, 2009	Mount Lemmon	Mount Lemmon Survey	·	3.1 km	MPC · JPL
725634	2009 BT_{171}	—	January 17, 2009	Kitt Peak	Spacewatch	·	2.7 km	MPC · JPL
725635	2009 BK_{176}	—	January 31, 2009	Kitt Peak	Spacewatch	KON	1.9 km	MPC · JPL
725636	2009 BU_{184}	—	January 18, 2009	Socorro	LINEAR	·	3.1 km	MPC · JPL
725637	2009 BT_{185}	—	January 20, 2009	Catalina	CSS	·	1.9 km	MPC · JPL
725638	2009 BA_{189}	—	January 20, 2009	Catalina	CSS	TIR	2.5 km	MPC · JPL
725639	2009 BQ_{192}	—	January 20, 2009	Bergisch Gladbach	W. Bickel	·	2.0 km	MPC · JPL
725640	2009 BQ_{193}	—	January 30, 2009	Siding Spring	SSS	·	1.6 km	MPC · JPL
725641	2009 BT_{193}	—	January 31, 2009	Mount Lemmon	Mount Lemmon Survey	HNS	1.1 km	MPC · JPL
725642	2009 BT_{195}	—	September 18, 2011	Mount Lemmon	Mount Lemmon Survey	·	1.6 km	MPC · JPL
725643	2009 BW_{195}	—	July 25, 2010	WISE	WISE	·	2.1 km	MPC · JPL
725644	2009 BC_{196}	—	April 30, 2010	WISE	WISE	·	3.5 km	MPC · JPL
725645	2009 BQ_{196}	—	April 7, 2014	Mount Lemmon	Mount Lemmon Survey	·	1.5 km	MPC · JPL
725646	2009 BZ_{198}	—	January 20, 2009	Kitt Peak	Spacewatch	·	1.5 km	MPC · JPL
725647	2009 BA_{199}	—	April 4, 2014	Kitt Peak	Spacewatch	·	1.1 km	MPC · JPL
725648	2009 BD_{199}	—	January 31, 2009	Mount Lemmon	Mount Lemmon Survey	·	1.6 km	MPC · JPL
725649	2009 BR_{199}	—	January 31, 2009	Mount Lemmon	Mount Lemmon Survey	EOS	1.6 km	MPC · JPL
725650	2009 BZ_{199}	—	January 19, 2009	Mount Lemmon	Mount Lemmon Survey	·	2.4 km	MPC · JPL
725651	2009 BF_{200}	—	May 20, 2014	Haleakala	Pan-STARRS 1	·	1.0 km	MPC · JPL
725652	2009 BJ_{200}	—	June 7, 1994	Kitt Peak	Spacewatch	EUN	1.1 km	MPC · JPL
725653	2009 BL_{200}	—	January 31, 2009	Mount Lemmon	Mount Lemmon Survey	·	2.7 km	MPC · JPL
725654	2009 BN_{200}	—	January 20, 2009	Mount Lemmon	Mount Lemmon Survey	·	3.0 km	MPC · JPL
725655	2009 BO_{200}	—	June 21, 2010	Mount Lemmon	Mount Lemmon Survey	·	530 m	MPC · JPL
725656	2009 BB_{201}	—	November 29, 2013	Mount Lemmon	Mount Lemmon Survey	·	2.5 km	MPC · JPL
725657	2009 BQ_{201}	—	January 20, 2018	Haleakala	Pan-STARRS 1	·	1.5 km	MPC · JPL
725658	2009 BX_{201}	—	January 23, 2018	Mount Lemmon	Mount Lemmon Survey	·	1.3 km	MPC · JPL
725659	2009 BZ_{201}	—	January 29, 2009	Kitt Peak	Spacewatch	EOS	1.6 km	MPC · JPL
725660	2009 BC_{203}	—	February 18, 2015	Haleakala	Pan-STARRS 1	VER	2.2 km	MPC · JPL
725661	2009 BD_{203}	—	January 17, 2009	Mount Lemmon	Mount Lemmon Survey	·	2.4 km	MPC · JPL
725662	2009 BZ_{203}	—	January 18, 2009	Kitt Peak	Spacewatch	·	2.5 km	MPC · JPL
725663	2009 BC_{204}	—	February 16, 2015	Haleakala	Pan-STARRS 1	·	2.6 km	MPC · JPL
725664	2009 BF_{204}	—	November 29, 2013	Haleakala	Pan-STARRS 1	·	1.7 km	MPC · JPL
725665	2009 BU_{205}	—	January 25, 2009	Kitt Peak	Spacewatch	THM	2.1 km	MPC · JPL
725666	2009 BZ_{208}	—	January 20, 2009	Kitt Peak	Spacewatch	·	1.2 km	MPC · JPL
725667	2009 BP_{209}	—	January 26, 2009	Mount Lemmon	Mount Lemmon Survey	·	1.3 km	MPC · JPL
725668	2009 BW_{209}	—	January 20, 2009	Kitt Peak	Spacewatch	·	1.0 km	MPC · JPL
725669	2009 BQ_{210}	—	January 20, 2009	Kitt Peak	Spacewatch	·	1.3 km	MPC · JPL
725670	2009 BR_{211}	—	January 31, 2009	Mount Lemmon	Mount Lemmon Survey	·	2.7 km	MPC · JPL
725671	2009 BT_{211}	—	January 25, 2009	Kitt Peak	Spacewatch	(1298)	2.4 km	MPC · JPL
725672	2009 BX_{213}	—	January 20, 2009	Kitt Peak	Spacewatch	·	580 m	MPC · JPL
725673	2009 BQ_{217}	—	January 20, 2009	Mount Lemmon	Mount Lemmon Survey	·	570 m	MPC · JPL
725674	2009 CC	—	February 2, 2009	Mount Lemmon	Mount Lemmon Survey	·	1.7 km	MPC · JPL
725675	2009 CX	—	December 22, 2008	Mount Lemmon	Mount Lemmon Survey	·	800 m	MPC · JPL
725676	2009 CF_{3}	—	February 3, 2009	Cerro Burek	I. de la Cueva	EUP	3.9 km	MPC · JPL
725677	2009 CG_{3}	—	January 1, 2008	Mount Lemmon	Mount Lemmon Survey	EUP	3.4 km	MPC · JPL
725678	2009 CN_{3}	—	February 2, 2009	Moletai	K. Černis, Zdanavicius, J.	(5)	1.1 km	MPC · JPL
725679	2009 CC_{5}	—	February 12, 2009	Calar Alto	F. Hormuth, Datson, J. C.	·	1.3 km	MPC · JPL
725680	2009 CA_{12}	—	September 16, 2003	Kitt Peak	Spacewatch	·	890 m	MPC · JPL
725681	2009 CL_{13}	—	October 12, 2007	Mount Lemmon	Mount Lemmon Survey	·	1.2 km	MPC · JPL
725682	2009 CB_{16}	—	May 10, 2005	Kitt Peak	Spacewatch	·	1.6 km	MPC · JPL
725683	2009 CW_{16}	—	February 1, 2009	Mount Lemmon	Mount Lemmon Survey	·	1.8 km	MPC · JPL
725684	2009 CF_{17}	—	September 12, 2007	Mount Lemmon	Mount Lemmon Survey	·	1.4 km	MPC · JPL
725685	2009 CL_{17}	—	February 3, 2009	Mount Lemmon	Mount Lemmon Survey	·	2.8 km	MPC · JPL
725686	2009 CL_{18}	—	February 3, 2009	Mount Lemmon	Mount Lemmon Survey	(5)	1.1 km	MPC · JPL
725687	2009 CV_{23}	—	February 1, 2009	Kitt Peak	Spacewatch	·	1.3 km	MPC · JPL
725688	2009 CE_{25}	—	February 1, 2009	Kitt Peak	Spacewatch	·	1.6 km	MPC · JPL
725689	2009 CS_{27}	—	February 1, 2009	Kitt Peak	Spacewatch	LUT	3.9 km	MPC · JPL
725690	2009 CE_{34}	—	October 11, 2007	Catalina	CSS	·	2.0 km	MPC · JPL
725691	2009 CD_{36}	—	January 17, 2009	Kitt Peak	Spacewatch	·	840 m	MPC · JPL
725692	2009 CA_{40}	—	February 5, 2009	Kitt Peak	Spacewatch	·	630 m	MPC · JPL
725693	2009 CC_{40}	—	February 14, 2009	Mount Lemmon	Mount Lemmon Survey	·	2.4 km	MPC · JPL
725694	2009 CQ_{40}	—	January 25, 2009	Kitt Peak	Spacewatch	·	1.3 km	MPC · JPL
725695	2009 CP_{41}	—	February 13, 2009	Kitt Peak	Spacewatch	·	2.9 km	MPC · JPL
725696	2009 CQ_{41}	—	January 29, 2009	Kitt Peak	Spacewatch	·	1.3 km	MPC · JPL
725697	2009 CW_{41}	—	September 24, 2007	Kitt Peak	Spacewatch	·	2.1 km	MPC · JPL
725698	2009 CL_{43}	—	February 14, 2009	Kitt Peak	Spacewatch	EUN	1.1 km	MPC · JPL
725699	2009 CC_{46}	—	January 3, 2009	Kitt Peak	Spacewatch	·	1.0 km	MPC · JPL
725700	2009 CK_{47}	—	April 14, 2004	Kitt Peak	Spacewatch	·	2.1 km	MPC · JPL

== 725701–725800 ==
back to top

Designation			Discovery			Properties		Ref
Permanent	Provisional	Named after	Date	Site	Discoverer(s)	Category	Diam.	Ref
725701	2009 CY_{47}	—	September 28, 2003	Kitt Peak	Spacewatch	·	1.2 km	MPC · JPL
725702	2009 CJ_{56}	—	February 2, 2009	Mount Lemmon	Mount Lemmon Survey	·	2.5 km	MPC · JPL
725703	2009 CK_{59}	—	February 14, 2009	Kitt Peak	Spacewatch	ADE	1.7 km	MPC · JPL
725704	2009 CR_{61}	—	October 12, 2007	Mount Lemmon	Mount Lemmon Survey	·	1.3 km	MPC · JPL
725705	2009 CX_{63}	—	February 1, 2009	Kitt Peak	Spacewatch	VER	2.6 km	MPC · JPL
725706	2009 CH_{64}	—	March 11, 2005	Mount Lemmon	Mount Lemmon Survey	·	1.3 km	MPC · JPL
725707	2009 CO_{67}	—	February 1, 2009	Kitt Peak	Spacewatch	·	1.4 km	MPC · JPL
725708	2009 CR_{67}	—	May 20, 2010	WISE	WISE	·	720 m	MPC · JPL
725709	2009 CE_{68}	—	July 24, 2010	WISE	WISE	EUP	2.9 km	MPC · JPL
725710	2009 CG_{68}	—	February 3, 2009	Mount Lemmon	Mount Lemmon Survey	·	1.3 km	MPC · JPL
725711	2009 CS_{68}	—	May 7, 2014	Haleakala	Pan-STARRS 1	·	1.9 km	MPC · JPL
725712	2009 CU_{68}	—	January 29, 2015	Haleakala	Pan-STARRS 1	·	2.6 km	MPC · JPL
725713	2009 CD_{71}	—	April 2, 2005	Siding Spring	SSS	·	1.8 km	MPC · JPL
725714	2009 CL_{71}	—	February 1, 2009	Kitt Peak	Spacewatch	·	2.0 km	MPC · JPL
725715	2009 CM_{71}	—	October 28, 2017	Haleakala	Pan-STARRS 1	·	440 m	MPC · JPL
725716	2009 CO_{71}	—	July 25, 2015	Haleakala	Pan-STARRS 1	·	1.5 km	MPC · JPL
725717	2009 CB_{74}	—	November 28, 2013	Mount Lemmon	Mount Lemmon Survey	·	2.5 km	MPC · JPL
725718	2009 CE_{74}	—	February 5, 2009	Kitt Peak	Spacewatch	·	1.6 km	MPC · JPL
725719	2009 CZ_{74}	—	February 1, 2009	Kitt Peak	Spacewatch	·	2.6 km	MPC · JPL
725720	2009 CF_{80}	—	February 4, 2009	Mount Lemmon	Mount Lemmon Survey	NEM	1.8 km	MPC · JPL
725721	2009 DM_{4}	—	January 27, 2006	Mount Lemmon	Mount Lemmon Survey	L5	10 km	MPC · JPL
725722	2009 DG_{6}	—	January 1, 2009	Mount Lemmon	Mount Lemmon Survey	·	550 m	MPC · JPL
725723	2009 DC_{7}	—	January 16, 2009	Mount Lemmon	Mount Lemmon Survey	·	1.4 km	MPC · JPL
725724	2009 DG_{10}	—	February 4, 2009	Mount Lemmon	Mount Lemmon Survey	·	1.0 km	MPC · JPL
725725	2009 DA_{13}	—	August 27, 2006	Kitt Peak	Spacewatch	EUN	1.2 km	MPC · JPL
725726	2009 DN_{18}	—	January 11, 2003	Kitt Peak	Spacewatch	·	2.5 km	MPC · JPL
725727	2009 DC_{19}	—	February 20, 2009	Kitt Peak	Spacewatch	·	740 m	MPC · JPL
725728	2009 DC_{25}	—	February 14, 2009	Mount Lemmon	Mount Lemmon Survey	·	670 m	MPC · JPL
725729	2009 DF_{27}	—	February 22, 2009	Calar Alto	F. Hormuth	VER	1.8 km	MPC · JPL
725730	2009 DS_{27}	—	February 22, 2009	Calar Alto	F. Hormuth	MRX	780 m	MPC · JPL
725731	2009 DM_{28}	—	November 26, 2003	Kitt Peak	Spacewatch	·	890 m	MPC · JPL
725732	2009 DZ_{28}	—	February 23, 2009	Calar Alto	F. Hormuth	·	1.1 km	MPC · JPL
725733	2009 DH_{30}	—	February 23, 2009	Calar Alto	F. Hormuth	·	1.3 km	MPC · JPL
725734	2009 DB_{33}	—	February 20, 2009	Kitt Peak	Spacewatch	·	1.7 km	MPC · JPL
725735	2009 DH_{33}	—	February 20, 2009	Kitt Peak	Spacewatch	EUN	880 m	MPC · JPL
725736	2009 DD_{37}	—	October 4, 2007	Mount Lemmon	Mount Lemmon Survey	·	2.5 km	MPC · JPL
725737	2009 DU_{39}	—	February 3, 2009	Mount Lemmon	Mount Lemmon Survey	LIX	2.7 km	MPC · JPL
725738	2009 DA_{58}	—	July 29, 2005	Palomar	NEAT	·	3.8 km	MPC · JPL
725739	2009 DE_{59}	—	February 22, 2009	Kitt Peak	Spacewatch	·	510 m	MPC · JPL
725740	2009 DK_{62}	—	February 5, 2009	Kitt Peak	Spacewatch	·	2.7 km	MPC · JPL
725741	2009 DL_{62}	—	January 31, 2009	Kitt Peak	Spacewatch	·	2.6 km	MPC · JPL
725742	2009 DW_{62}	—	February 22, 2009	Kitt Peak	Spacewatch	·	2.3 km	MPC · JPL
725743	2009 DY_{62}	—	February 22, 2009	Kitt Peak	Spacewatch	·	630 m	MPC · JPL
725744	2009 DQ_{64}	—	February 22, 2009	Kitt Peak	Spacewatch	·	1.6 km	MPC · JPL
725745	2009 DY_{65}	—	November 18, 2001	Kitt Peak	Deep Lens Survey	HYG	2.1 km	MPC · JPL
725746	2009 DP_{75}	—	November 15, 2007	Catalina	CSS	·	4.6 km	MPC · JPL
725747	2009 DL_{76}	—	January 30, 2009	Kitt Peak	Spacewatch	·	1.2 km	MPC · JPL
725748	2009 DQ_{76}	—	February 21, 2009	Mount Lemmon	Mount Lemmon Survey	·	500 m	MPC · JPL
725749	2009 DN_{87}	—	February 27, 2009	Kitt Peak	Spacewatch	·	1.7 km	MPC · JPL
725750	2009 DH_{88}	—	February 22, 2009	Kitt Peak	Spacewatch	MIS	2.3 km	MPC · JPL
725751	2009 DE_{90}	—	January 25, 2009	Kitt Peak	Spacewatch	ARM	3.2 km	MPC · JPL
725752	2009 DY_{90}	—	January 16, 2009	Kitt Peak	Spacewatch	·	1.2 km	MPC · JPL
725753	2009 DH_{91}	—	October 4, 2007	Kitt Peak	Spacewatch	·	990 m	MPC · JPL
725754	2009 DD_{98}	—	December 30, 2008	Mount Lemmon	Mount Lemmon Survey	·	3.5 km	MPC · JPL
725755	2009 DY_{99}	—	March 3, 2000	Apache Point	SDSS Collaboration	·	1.9 km	MPC · JPL
725756	2009 DR_{114}	—	January 15, 2009	Kitt Peak	Spacewatch	·	1.5 km	MPC · JPL
725757	2009 DL_{121}	—	February 27, 2009	Mount Lemmon	Mount Lemmon Survey	·	2.5 km	MPC · JPL
725758	2009 DB_{133}	—	September 26, 2006	Kitt Peak	Spacewatch	·	2.5 km	MPC · JPL
725759	2009 DW_{138}	—	February 22, 2009	Kitt Peak	Spacewatch	MAR	980 m	MPC · JPL
725760	2009 DM_{140}	—	February 21, 2009	Kitt Peak	Spacewatch	·	1.1 km	MPC · JPL
725761	2009 DU_{145}	—	September 20, 2015	Mount Lemmon	Mount Lemmon Survey	EUN	1.0 km	MPC · JPL
725762	2009 DC_{146}	—	September 19, 1998	Apache Point	SDSS Collaboration	·	2.0 km	MPC · JPL
725763	2009 DO_{146}	—	February 27, 2009	Catalina	CSS	·	710 m	MPC · JPL
725764	2009 DW_{146}	—	February 1, 2009	Kitt Peak	Spacewatch	EOS	1.6 km	MPC · JPL
725765	2009 DB_{147}	—	January 17, 2013	Haleakala	Pan-STARRS 1	HOF	2.1 km	MPC · JPL
725766	2009 DG_{147}	—	January 17, 2009	Kitt Peak	Spacewatch	·	1.7 km	MPC · JPL
725767	2009 DQ_{147}	—	February 27, 2009	Catalina	CSS	·	640 m	MPC · JPL
725768	2009 DD_{148}	—	February 20, 2009	Kitt Peak	Spacewatch	MAR	860 m	MPC · JPL
725769	2009 DF_{148}	—	February 11, 2016	Haleakala	Pan-STARRS 1	·	600 m	MPC · JPL
725770	2009 DG_{150}	—	February 19, 2009	Mount Lemmon	Mount Lemmon Survey	·	550 m	MPC · JPL
725771	2009 DJ_{151}	—	February 16, 2009	Kitt Peak	Spacewatch	EUN	1.1 km	MPC · JPL
725772	2009 DP_{151}	—	May 19, 2015	Cerro Tololo-DECam	DECam	·	1.3 km	MPC · JPL
725773	2009 DA_{152}	—	January 23, 2014	Kitt Peak	Spacewatch	EOS	1.4 km	MPC · JPL
725774	2009 DN_{152}	—	November 3, 2015	Mount Lemmon	Mount Lemmon Survey	·	760 m	MPC · JPL
725775	2009 DP_{152}	—	February 22, 2009	Mount Lemmon	Mount Lemmon Survey	·	1.9 km	MPC · JPL
725776	2009 DY_{152}	—	February 19, 2009	Kitt Peak	Spacewatch	·	600 m	MPC · JPL
725777	2009 DF_{153}	—	February 22, 2009	Kitt Peak	Spacewatch	·	2.6 km	MPC · JPL
725778	2009 DZ_{155}	—	September 30, 2006	Mount Lemmon	Mount Lemmon Survey	TIN	960 m	MPC · JPL
725779	2009 DZ_{156}	—	February 22, 2009	Catalina	CSS	·	1.8 km	MPC · JPL
725780	2009 DL_{157}	—	February 21, 2009	Kitt Peak	Spacewatch	·	1.3 km	MPC · JPL
725781	2009 DU_{161}	—	February 26, 2009	Kitt Peak	Spacewatch	·	1.3 km	MPC · JPL
725782	2009 EA_{3}	—	March 5, 2009	Cerro Burek	I. de la Cueva	·	2.2 km	MPC · JPL
725783	2009 EG_{5}	—	January 30, 2009	Mount Lemmon	Mount Lemmon Survey	·	3.1 km	MPC · JPL
725784	2009 EK_{25}	—	September 9, 2007	Mount Lemmon	Mount Lemmon Survey	·	610 m	MPC · JPL
725785	2009 EE_{32}	—	April 22, 2004	Apache Point	SDSS Collaboration	EUP	3.0 km	MPC · JPL
725786	2009 EA_{33}	—	January 18, 2012	Mount Lemmon	Mount Lemmon Survey	·	840 m	MPC · JPL
725787	2009 EJ_{33}	—	February 26, 2014	Haleakala	Pan-STARRS 1	EOS	1.4 km	MPC · JPL
725788	2009 ET_{33}	—	February 17, 2015	Haleakala	Pan-STARRS 1	URS	2.8 km	MPC · JPL
725789	2009 EC_{34}	—	April 10, 2016	Haleakala	Pan-STARRS 1	·	2.3 km	MPC · JPL
725790	2009 EE_{35}	—	July 27, 2010	WISE	WISE	·	2.5 km	MPC · JPL
725791	2009 EU_{35}	—	February 15, 2013	ESA OGS	ESA OGS	·	1.1 km	MPC · JPL
725792	2009 EW_{35}	—	December 23, 2012	Haleakala	Pan-STARRS 1	·	1.2 km	MPC · JPL
725793	2009 EH_{36}	—	January 28, 2014	Kitt Peak	Spacewatch	·	2.4 km	MPC · JPL
725794	2009 EV_{36}	—	March 2, 2009	Kitt Peak	Spacewatch	·	1.3 km	MPC · JPL
725795	2009 EZ_{36}	—	January 18, 2010	WISE	WISE	T_{j} (2.98) · 3:2	5.6 km	MPC · JPL
725796	2009 EA_{37}	—	September 23, 2011	Kitt Peak	Spacewatch	·	1.4 km	MPC · JPL
725797	2009 EH_{37}	—	September 23, 2017	Haleakala	Pan-STARRS 1	·	1.7 km	MPC · JPL
725798	2009 EV_{37}	—	April 9, 2010	Kitt Peak	Spacewatch	·	2.2 km	MPC · JPL
725799	2009 EA_{38}	—	January 24, 2015	Mount Lemmon	Mount Lemmon Survey	·	2.9 km	MPC · JPL
725800	2009 EW_{38}	—	March 2, 2009	Mount Lemmon	Mount Lemmon Survey	·	1.5 km	MPC · JPL

== 725801–725900 ==
back to top

Designation			Discovery			Properties		Ref
Permanent	Provisional	Named after	Date	Site	Discoverer(s)	Category	Diam.	Ref
725801	2009 EP_{41}	—	March 2, 2009	Mount Lemmon	Mount Lemmon Survey	·	2.4 km	MPC · JPL
725802	2009 EA_{43}	—	March 2, 2009	Kitt Peak	Spacewatch	·	1.3 km	MPC · JPL
725803	2009 FY_{5}	—	March 16, 2009	Kitt Peak	Spacewatch	EOS	1.5 km	MPC · JPL
725804	2009 FO_{6}	—	March 16, 2009	Kitt Peak	Spacewatch	URS	3.2 km	MPC · JPL
725805	2009 FU_{8}	—	March 16, 2009	Kitt Peak	Spacewatch	·	2.5 km	MPC · JPL
725806	2009 FK_{10}	—	March 17, 2009	Kitt Peak	Spacewatch	EOS	1.4 km	MPC · JPL
725807	2009 FG_{14}	—	January 13, 2004	Kitt Peak	Spacewatch	·	1.7 km	MPC · JPL
725808	2009 FU_{16}	—	January 17, 2009	Kitt Peak	Spacewatch	EOS	2.0 km	MPC · JPL
725809	2009 FE_{18}	—	March 18, 2009	La Sagra	OAM	·	2.1 km	MPC · JPL
725810	2009 FM_{19}	—	March 21, 2009	Vicques	M. Ory	·	1.0 km	MPC · JPL
725811	2009 FN_{20}	—	March 17, 2009	Bergisch Gladbach	W. Bickel	·	2.1 km	MPC · JPL
725812	2009 FS_{28}	—	November 14, 1998	Kitt Peak	Spacewatch	·	1.4 km	MPC · JPL
725813	2009 FA_{36}	—	February 28, 2009	Kitt Peak	Spacewatch	·	700 m	MPC · JPL
725814	2009 FB_{38}	—	March 24, 2009	Mount Lemmon	Mount Lemmon Survey	·	2.6 km	MPC · JPL
725815	2009 FU_{39}	—	March 27, 2009	Mount Lemmon	Mount Lemmon Survey	·	720 m	MPC · JPL
725816	2009 FH_{43}	—	March 29, 2009	Sandlot	G. Hug	·	1.7 km	MPC · JPL
725817	2009 FJ_{45}	—	March 29, 2009	Sandlot	G. Hug	·	560 m	MPC · JPL
725818	2009 FK_{47}	—	March 18, 2009	Kitt Peak	Spacewatch	·	1.4 km	MPC · JPL
725819	2009 FX_{49}	—	March 19, 2009	Kitt Peak	Spacewatch	·	720 m	MPC · JPL
725820	2009 FV_{57}	—	September 18, 2006	Kitt Peak	Spacewatch	·	1.7 km	MPC · JPL
725821	2009 FF_{59}	—	March 26, 2009	Kitt Peak	Spacewatch	·	2.3 km	MPC · JPL
725822	2009 FT_{61}	—	March 18, 2009	Kitt Peak	Spacewatch	·	1.4 km	MPC · JPL
725823	2009 FC_{62}	—	March 2, 2009	Kitt Peak	Spacewatch	MRX	890 m	MPC · JPL
725824	2009 FO_{62}	—	March 1, 2009	Kitt Peak	Spacewatch	·	1.7 km	MPC · JPL
725825	2009 FQ_{65}	—	March 18, 2009	Mount Lemmon	Mount Lemmon Survey	GEF	1 km	MPC · JPL
725826	2009 FH_{67}	—	October 10, 2007	Kitt Peak	Spacewatch	LIX	2.5 km	MPC · JPL
725827	2009 FV_{67}	—	March 23, 2009	Calar Alto	F. Hormuth	THM	1.9 km	MPC · JPL
725828	2009 FU_{77}	—	February 1, 2009	Kitt Peak	Spacewatch	HOF	1.9 km	MPC · JPL
725829	2009 FR_{80}	—	March 31, 2010	WISE	WISE	·	2.1 km	MPC · JPL
725830	2009 FM_{82}	—	March 31, 2009	Kitt Peak	Spacewatch	NYS	830 m	MPC · JPL
725831	2009 FT_{82}	—	March 27, 2009	Mount Lemmon	Mount Lemmon Survey	JUN	850 m	MPC · JPL
725832	2009 FU_{82}	—	March 26, 2009	Mount Lemmon	Mount Lemmon Survey	·	1.6 km	MPC · JPL
725833	2009 FE_{83}	—	December 3, 2012	Mount Lemmon	Mount Lemmon Survey	·	2.5 km	MPC · JPL
725834	2009 FL_{83}	—	October 3, 2013	Mount Lemmon	Mount Lemmon Survey	·	620 m	MPC · JPL
725835	2009 FQ_{83}	—	November 26, 2014	Haleakala	Pan-STARRS 1	·	640 m	MPC · JPL
725836	2009 FM_{84}	—	September 28, 2011	Mount Lemmon	Mount Lemmon Survey	·	1.4 km	MPC · JPL
725837	2009 FB_{85}	—	November 6, 2012	Mount Lemmon	Mount Lemmon Survey	·	2.3 km	MPC · JPL
725838	2009 FN_{86}	—	March 19, 2009	Kitt Peak	Spacewatch	·	1.5 km	MPC · JPL
725839	2009 FQ_{86}	—	March 22, 2015	Haleakala	Pan-STARRS 1	URS	2.3 km	MPC · JPL
725840	2009 FR_{86}	—	September 22, 2017	Haleakala	Pan-STARRS 1	EOS	1.5 km	MPC · JPL
725841	2009 FK_{87}	—	May 14, 2004	Apache Point	SDSS Collaboration	·	2.5 km	MPC · JPL
725842	2009 FN_{87}	—	October 19, 2016	Mount Lemmon	Mount Lemmon Survey	·	1.8 km	MPC · JPL
725843	2009 FW_{87}	—	December 23, 2012	Haleakala	Pan-STARRS 1	AGN	990 m	MPC · JPL
725844	2009 FY_{87}	—	March 22, 2009	Mount Lemmon	Mount Lemmon Survey	·	1.5 km	MPC · JPL
725845	2009 FG_{89}	—	October 25, 2011	Haleakala	Pan-STARRS 1	·	1.1 km	MPC · JPL
725846	2009 FJ_{89}	—	March 21, 2009	Mount Lemmon	Mount Lemmon Survey	·	1.3 km	MPC · JPL
725847	2009 FJ_{90}	—	March 26, 2009	Kitt Peak	Spacewatch	HYG	2.1 km	MPC · JPL
725848	2009 FL_{90}	—	March 31, 2009	Kitt Peak	Spacewatch	·	2.8 km	MPC · JPL
725849	2009 FC_{91}	—	March 19, 2009	Kitt Peak	Spacewatch	·	2.6 km	MPC · JPL
725850	2009 FZ_{91}	—	March 19, 2009	Mount Lemmon	Mount Lemmon Survey	·	1.8 km	MPC · JPL
725851	2009 FF_{92}	—	March 21, 2009	Mount Lemmon	Mount Lemmon Survey	·	2.2 km	MPC · JPL
725852	2009 FZ_{95}	—	March 29, 2009	Mount Lemmon	Mount Lemmon Survey	·	1.0 km	MPC · JPL
725853	2009 GL_{1}	—	July 30, 2005	Palomar	NEAT	(13314)	3.7 km	MPC · JPL
725854	2009 GW_{6}	—	April 23, 2015	Haleakala	Pan-STARRS 1	·	2.7 km	MPC · JPL
725855	2009 GP_{7}	—	August 10, 2015	Haleakala	Pan-STARRS 1	HNS	820 m	MPC · JPL
725856	2009 GQ_{7}	—	April 2, 2009	Mount Lemmon	Mount Lemmon Survey	·	1.3 km	MPC · JPL
725857	2009 GC_{8}	—	April 2, 2009	Kitt Peak	Spacewatch	·	510 m	MPC · JPL
725858	2009 GF_{8}	—	July 5, 2016	Mount Lemmon	Mount Lemmon Survey	·	550 m	MPC · JPL
725859	2009 GG_{8}	—	September 19, 2006	Kitt Peak	Spacewatch	·	1.6 km	MPC · JPL
725860	2009 GM_{8}	—	February 3, 2012	Haleakala	Pan-STARRS 1	·	460 m	MPC · JPL
725861	2009 GT_{8}	—	October 18, 2011	Kitt Peak	Spacewatch	·	1.3 km	MPC · JPL
725862	2009 HK_{6}	—	April 17, 2009	Kitt Peak	Spacewatch	·	1.5 km	MPC · JPL
725863	2009 HQ_{12}	—	April 19, 2009	Andrushivka	Andrushivka Astronomical Observatory	·	3.2 km	MPC · JPL
725864	2009 HH_{16}	—	April 18, 2009	Kitt Peak	Spacewatch	·	760 m	MPC · JPL
725865	2009 HE_{18}	—	March 16, 2009	Kitt Peak	Spacewatch	·	1.8 km	MPC · JPL
725866	2009 HQ_{19}	—	April 18, 2009	Altschwendt	W. Ries	AEO	1.1 km	MPC · JPL
725867	2009 HJ_{28}	—	April 18, 2009	Kitt Peak	Spacewatch	NYS	720 m	MPC · JPL
725868	2009 HB_{29}	—	April 19, 2009	Kitt Peak	Spacewatch	CLA	1.7 km	MPC · JPL
725869	2009 HU_{33}	—	April 19, 2009	Mount Lemmon	Mount Lemmon Survey	·	510 m	MPC · JPL
725870	2009 HT_{34}	—	March 29, 2009	Mount Lemmon	Mount Lemmon Survey	·	2.9 km	MPC · JPL
725871	2009 HR_{37}	—	May 7, 2005	Mount Lemmon	Mount Lemmon Survey	·	1.8 km	MPC · JPL
725872	2009 HD_{42}	—	April 20, 2009	Kitt Peak	Spacewatch	·	640 m	MPC · JPL
725873	2009 HJ_{42}	—	August 13, 2005	Siding Spring	SSS	TIN	1 km	MPC · JPL
725874	2009 HF_{52}	—	March 15, 2004	Kitt Peak	Spacewatch	·	2.0 km	MPC · JPL
725875	2009 HT_{54}	—	December 19, 2001	Palomar	NEAT	·	4.0 km	MPC · JPL
725876	2009 HL_{55}	—	April 21, 2009	Mount Lemmon	Mount Lemmon Survey	·	630 m	MPC · JPL
725877	2009 HY_{55}	—	August 29, 2006	Kitt Peak	Spacewatch	·	640 m	MPC · JPL
725878	2009 HZ_{57}	—	April 24, 2009	Mount Lemmon	Mount Lemmon Survey	·	1.8 km	MPC · JPL
725879	2009 HR_{61}	—	April 20, 2009	Mount Lemmon	Mount Lemmon Survey	·	2.5 km	MPC · JPL
725880	2009 HO_{71}	—	April 22, 2009	Mount Lemmon	Mount Lemmon Survey	·	1.4 km	MPC · JPL
725881	2009 HR_{74}	—	April 26, 2009	Catalina	CSS	PHO	640 m	MPC · JPL
725882	2009 HV_{83}	—	April 27, 2009	Kitt Peak	Spacewatch	·	510 m	MPC · JPL
725883	2009 HQ_{84}	—	April 27, 2009	Kitt Peak	Spacewatch	·	1.5 km	MPC · JPL
725884	2009 HY_{85}	—	April 29, 2009	Kitt Peak	Spacewatch	·	490 m	MPC · JPL
725885	2009 HK_{86}	—	April 30, 2009	Mount Lemmon	Mount Lemmon Survey	·	540 m	MPC · JPL
725886	2009 HA_{87}	—	April 30, 2009	Mount Lemmon	Mount Lemmon Survey	·	1.5 km	MPC · JPL
725887	2009 HL_{87}	—	April 30, 2009	Mount Lemmon	Mount Lemmon Survey	·	1.7 km	MPC · JPL
725888	2009 HL_{93}	—	April 30, 2009	Kitt Peak	Spacewatch	·	2.4 km	MPC · JPL
725889	2009 HZ_{94}	—	February 8, 2008	Kitt Peak	Spacewatch	·	1.8 km	MPC · JPL
725890	2009 HD_{95}	—	April 29, 2009	Cerro Burek	I. de la Cueva	·	860 m	MPC · JPL
725891	2009 HF_{98}	—	April 20, 2009	Kitt Peak	Spacewatch	V	470 m	MPC · JPL
725892	2009 HQ_{102}	—	April 23, 2009	Kitt Peak	Spacewatch	·	1.4 km	MPC · JPL
725893	2009 HY_{106}	—	April 24, 2009	Mount Lemmon	Mount Lemmon Survey	·	2.7 km	MPC · JPL
725894	2009 HK_{110}	—	July 31, 2006	Siding Spring	SSS	·	1.2 km	MPC · JPL
725895	2009 HW_{110}	—	April 17, 2009	Kitt Peak	Spacewatch	·	830 m	MPC · JPL
725896	2009 HZ_{110}	—	April 19, 2009	Mount Lemmon	Mount Lemmon Survey	·	1.8 km	MPC · JPL
725897	2009 HJ_{111}	—	April 29, 2009	Mount Lemmon	Mount Lemmon Survey	·	1.8 km	MPC · JPL
725898	2009 HK_{111}	—	September 17, 2010	Mount Lemmon	Mount Lemmon Survey	·	670 m	MPC · JPL
725899	2009 HY_{111}	—	September 28, 2010	Kitt Peak	Spacewatch	·	730 m	MPC · JPL
725900	2009 HH_{112}	—	October 17, 2010	Mount Lemmon	Mount Lemmon Survey	·	900 m	MPC · JPL

== 725901–726000 ==
back to top

Designation			Discovery			Properties		Ref
Permanent	Provisional	Named after	Date	Site	Discoverer(s)	Category	Diam.	Ref
725901	2009 HL_{112}	—	October 13, 2016	Haleakala	Pan-STARRS 1	·	2.0 km	MPC · JPL
725902	2009 HS_{112}	—	November 1, 2010	Mount Lemmon	Mount Lemmon Survey	·	490 m	MPC · JPL
725903	2009 HT_{112}	—	April 23, 2009	Kitt Peak	Spacewatch	·	700 m	MPC · JPL
725904	2009 HM_{113}	—	April 30, 2009	Kitt Peak	Spacewatch	PHO	840 m	MPC · JPL
725905	2009 HQ_{113}	—	April 13, 2010	WISE	WISE	·	2.3 km	MPC · JPL
725906	2009 HU_{113}	—	March 4, 2013	Haleakala	Pan-STARRS 1	·	1.4 km	MPC · JPL
725907	2009 HB_{114}	—	September 25, 2011	Haleakala	Pan-STARRS 1	·	3.4 km	MPC · JPL
725908	2009 HQ_{114}	—	April 22, 2009	Mount Lemmon	Mount Lemmon Survey	·	2.2 km	MPC · JPL
725909	2009 HH_{115}	—	April 27, 2009	Mount Lemmon	Mount Lemmon Survey	·	1.1 km	MPC · JPL
725910	2009 HE_{116}	—	April 20, 2009	Mount Lemmon	Mount Lemmon Survey	·	1.7 km	MPC · JPL
725911	2009 HG_{116}	—	March 8, 2013	Haleakala	Pan-STARRS 1	·	1.3 km	MPC · JPL
725912	2009 HJ_{116}	—	April 22, 2009	Mount Lemmon	Mount Lemmon Survey	·	3.3 km	MPC · JPL
725913	2009 HB_{117}	—	June 13, 2010	WISE	WISE	ADE	1.7 km	MPC · JPL
725914	2009 HW_{117}	—	May 21, 2015	Haleakala	Pan-STARRS 1	ARM	2.8 km	MPC · JPL
725915	2009 HK_{118}	—	October 10, 2015	Haleakala	Pan-STARRS 1	·	990 m	MPC · JPL
725916	2009 HY_{118}	—	January 19, 2013	Mount Lemmon	Mount Lemmon Survey	HNS	1.0 km	MPC · JPL
725917	2009 HZ_{118}	—	February 14, 2013	Kitt Peak	Spacewatch	AGN	920 m	MPC · JPL
725918	2009 HE_{119}	—	December 27, 2016	Mount Lemmon	Mount Lemmon Survey	·	1.5 km	MPC · JPL
725919	2009 HW_{119}	—	April 28, 2009	Mount Lemmon	Mount Lemmon Survey	·	570 m	MPC · JPL
725920	2009 HB_{121}	—	April 22, 2009	Mount Lemmon	Mount Lemmon Survey	·	1.5 km	MPC · JPL
725921	2009 HG_{121}	—	April 28, 2009	Kitt Peak	Spacewatch	L5	7.8 km	MPC · JPL
725922	2009 HP_{122}	—	April 24, 2009	Kitt Peak	Spacewatch	L5	7.6 km	MPC · JPL
725923	2009 HY_{122}	—	April 18, 2009	Mount Lemmon	Mount Lemmon Survey	·	2.5 km	MPC · JPL
725924	2009 HQ_{123}	—	March 14, 2004	Palomar	NEAT	·	1.7 km	MPC · JPL
725925	2009 HO_{125}	—	April 24, 2009	Mount Lemmon	Mount Lemmon Survey	L5	9.1 km	MPC · JPL
725926	2009 JU_{2}	—	May 13, 2009	Kitt Peak	Spacewatch	PHO	900 m	MPC · JPL
725927	2009 JB_{3}	—	March 31, 2009	Mount Lemmon	Mount Lemmon Survey	THM	2.1 km	MPC · JPL
725928	2009 JY_{3}	—	May 13, 2009	Kitt Peak	Spacewatch	·	2.8 km	MPC · JPL
725929	2009 JB_{8}	—	May 13, 2009	Kitt Peak	Spacewatch	·	1.8 km	MPC · JPL
725930	2009 JV_{8}	—	April 18, 2009	Kitt Peak	Spacewatch	ADE	1.6 km	MPC · JPL
725931	2009 JM_{9}	—	May 11, 2005	Kitt Peak	Spacewatch	BRG	1.2 km	MPC · JPL
725932	2009 JQ_{13}	—	May 1, 2009	Cerro Burek	I. de la Cueva	·	780 m	MPC · JPL
725933	2009 JD_{14}	—	May 1, 2009	Cerro Burek	I. de la Cueva	L5	8.5 km	MPC · JPL
725934	2009 JK_{15}	—	May 1, 2009	Mount Lemmon	Mount Lemmon Survey	·	2.4 km	MPC · JPL
725935	2009 JA_{20}	—	May 4, 2009	Mount Lemmon	Mount Lemmon Survey	·	840 m	MPC · JPL
725936	2009 JD_{20}	—	July 14, 2016	Haleakala	Pan-STARRS 1	·	2.3 km	MPC · JPL
725937	2009 JW_{20}	—	October 15, 2015	Haleakala	Pan-STARRS 1	·	1.5 km	MPC · JPL
725938	2009 JC_{21}	—	June 9, 2010	WISE	WISE	·	1.9 km	MPC · JPL
725939	2009 JM_{21}	—	November 7, 2012	Kitt Peak	Spacewatch	·	2.0 km	MPC · JPL
725940	2009 JN_{21}	—	January 27, 2012	Mount Lemmon	Mount Lemmon Survey	EUN	870 m	MPC · JPL
725941	2009 JE_{23}	—	May 15, 2009	Kitt Peak	Spacewatch	·	1.6 km	MPC · JPL
725942	2009 KT_{10}	—	April 24, 2009	Kitt Peak	Spacewatch	·	790 m	MPC · JPL
725943	2009 KA_{12}	—	May 25, 2009	Kitt Peak	Spacewatch	V	470 m	MPC · JPL
725944	2009 KG_{12}	—	May 25, 2009	Kitt Peak	Spacewatch	·	2.6 km	MPC · JPL
725945	2009 KF_{14}	—	February 8, 2008	Kitt Peak	Spacewatch	·	3.4 km	MPC · JPL
725946	2009 KQ_{15}	—	May 17, 2009	Kitt Peak	Spacewatch	·	1.3 km	MPC · JPL
725947	2009 KH_{16}	—	April 18, 2009	Mount Lemmon	Mount Lemmon Survey	·	1.1 km	MPC · JPL
725948	2009 KE_{20}	—	May 29, 2009	Kitt Peak	Spacewatch	·	1.5 km	MPC · JPL
725949	2009 KU_{22}	—	April 22, 2009	Mount Lemmon	Mount Lemmon Survey	L5	8.3 km	MPC · JPL
725950	2009 KH_{26}	—	May 29, 2009	Mount Lemmon	Mount Lemmon Survey	·	1.9 km	MPC · JPL
725951	2009 KV_{26}	—	May 29, 2009	Kitt Peak	Spacewatch	·	2.3 km	MPC · JPL
725952	2009 KP_{27}	—	May 30, 2009	Mount Lemmon	Mount Lemmon Survey	·	510 m	MPC · JPL
725953	2009 KR_{27}	—	October 29, 2005	Mount Lemmon	Mount Lemmon Survey	THM	2.7 km	MPC · JPL
725954	2009 KA_{28}	—	May 30, 2009	Mount Lemmon	Mount Lemmon Survey	L5	7.0 km	MPC · JPL
725955	2009 KV_{28}	—	March 26, 2009	Kitt Peak	Spacewatch	·	1.5 km	MPC · JPL
725956	2009 KD_{35}	—	May 28, 2009	Siding Spring	SSS	·	1.3 km	MPC · JPL
725957	2009 KW_{37}	—	September 24, 2011	Haleakala	Pan-STARRS 1	EOS	1.7 km	MPC · JPL
725958	2009 KY_{38}	—	May 29, 2009	Kitt Peak	Spacewatch	·	2.8 km	MPC · JPL
725959	2009 KC_{39}	—	November 27, 2014	Haleakala	Pan-STARRS 1	·	930 m	MPC · JPL
725960	2009 KG_{39}	—	April 10, 2013	Haleakala	Pan-STARRS 1	·	1.1 km	MPC · JPL
725961	2009 KR_{39}	—	March 16, 2012	Mount Lemmon	Mount Lemmon Survey	·	530 m	MPC · JPL
725962	2009 KT_{39}	—	September 1, 2013	Catalina	CSS	·	870 m	MPC · JPL
725963	2009 KN_{40}	—	July 9, 2010	WISE	WISE	·	2.6 km	MPC · JPL
725964	2009 KR_{40}	—	May 27, 2009	Mount Lemmon	Mount Lemmon Survey	·	630 m	MPC · JPL
725965	2009 KW_{40}	—	December 6, 2015	Mount Lemmon	Mount Lemmon Survey	·	1.2 km	MPC · JPL
725966	2009 KR_{41}	—	September 29, 2011	Mount Lemmon	Mount Lemmon Survey	·	2.4 km	MPC · JPL
725967	2009 KS_{41}	—	September 14, 2013	Mount Lemmon	Mount Lemmon Survey	·	500 m	MPC · JPL
725968	2009 KW_{41}	—	October 7, 2012	Haleakala	Pan-STARRS 1	L5	8.6 km	MPC · JPL
725969	2009 KA_{42}	—	January 29, 2017	Haleakala	Pan-STARRS 1	·	1.7 km	MPC · JPL
725970	2009 KP_{42}	—	May 18, 2009	Mount Lemmon	Mount Lemmon Survey	L5	8.4 km	MPC · JPL
725971	2009 KR_{42}	—	May 30, 2009	Mount Lemmon	Mount Lemmon Survey	GEF	1.0 km	MPC · JPL
725972	2009 KT_{42}	—	May 27, 2009	Mount Lemmon	Mount Lemmon Survey	DOR	2.0 km	MPC · JPL
725973	2009 KU_{42}	—	May 17, 2009	Mount Lemmon	Mount Lemmon Survey	L5	5.9 km	MPC · JPL
725974	2009 KL_{43}	—	May 29, 2009	Mount Lemmon	Mount Lemmon Survey	·	1.7 km	MPC · JPL
725975	2009 LL_{3}	—	June 22, 2004	Kitt Peak	Spacewatch	·	2.9 km	MPC · JPL
725976	2009 LN_{4}	—	June 12, 2009	Kitt Peak	Spacewatch	·	1.2 km	MPC · JPL
725977	2009 LS_{5}	—	June 15, 2009	Kitt Peak	Spacewatch	L5	8.9 km	MPC · JPL
725978	2009 MH_{2}	—	June 17, 2009	Kitt Peak	Spacewatch	·	670 m	MPC · JPL
725979	2009 MX_{5}	—	June 22, 2009	Kitt Peak	Spacewatch	·	850 m	MPC · JPL
725980	2009 MZ_{5}	—	April 18, 2009	Kitt Peak	Spacewatch	L5	7.1 km	MPC · JPL
725981	2009 MJ_{6}	—	June 22, 2009	Kitt Peak	Spacewatch	·	600 m	MPC · JPL
725982	2009 MG_{9}	—	June 24, 2009	Mount Lemmon	Mount Lemmon Survey	PHO	1.2 km	MPC · JPL
725983	2009 MO_{10}	—	November 6, 2013	Haleakala	Pan-STARRS 1	L5	10 km	MPC · JPL
725984	2009 MS_{10}	—	July 28, 2010	WISE	WISE	·	2.6 km	MPC · JPL
725985	2009 MG_{12}	—	May 2, 2009	Mount Lemmon	Mount Lemmon Survey	L5	10 km	MPC · JPL
725986	2009 NR	—	March 11, 2008	Catalina	CSS	·	4.9 km	MPC · JPL
725987	2009 OX_{14}	—	July 28, 2009	Cerro Burek	I. de la Cueva	TIN	950 m	MPC · JPL
725988	2009 OF_{18}	—	July 28, 2009	Kitt Peak	Spacewatch	CLA	1.2 km	MPC · JPL
725989	2009 OE_{26}	—	July 29, 2009	Kitt Peak	Spacewatch	·	1.1 km	MPC · JPL
725990	2009 OK_{26}	—	February 1, 2016	Haleakala	Pan-STARRS 1	·	1.3 km	MPC · JPL
725991	2009 OL_{26}	—	September 2, 2013	Mount Lemmon	Mount Lemmon Survey	NYS	880 m	MPC · JPL
725992	2009 OQ_{26}	—	June 23, 2009	Mount Lemmon	Mount Lemmon Survey	MAS	700 m	MPC · JPL
725993	2009 OY_{27}	—	June 18, 2013	Haleakala	Pan-STARRS 1	·	1.3 km	MPC · JPL
725994	2009 OA_{28}	—	September 4, 2014	Haleakala	Pan-STARRS 1	·	1.7 km	MPC · JPL
725995	2009 OC_{28}	—	July 27, 2009	Kitt Peak	Spacewatch	·	1.0 km	MPC · JPL
725996	2009 PM_{13}	—	August 15, 2009	Kitt Peak	Spacewatch	ELF	3.9 km	MPC · JPL
725997	2009 PZ_{21}	—	February 4, 2005	Kitt Peak	Spacewatch	T_{j} (2.95)	5.9 km	MPC · JPL
725998	2009 PN_{23}	—	August 15, 2009	Kitt Peak	Spacewatch	·	870 m	MPC · JPL
725999	2009 PQ_{23}	—	August 15, 2009	Kitt Peak	Spacewatch	·	2.4 km	MPC · JPL
726000	2009 QX_{3}	—	April 6, 2008	Kitt Peak	Spacewatch	(13314)	1.8 km	MPC · JPL

back to top
