= (725095) 2008 TN208 =

Asteroid

(725095) 2008 TN_{208}
Discovery
- Discovered by: WISE
- Discovery site: Earth orbit
- Discovery date: 5 April 2010 (first observed only)

Designations
- Alternative designations: 2010 GZ_{60}
- Minor planet category: main belt

Orbital characteristics
- Epoch 31 May 2020 (JD 2459000.5)
- Uncertainty parameter 0
- Observation arc: 18.12 yr (6,619 days)
- Aphelion: 2.8564 AU
- Perihelion: 2.5605 AU
- Semi-major axis: 2.7084 AU
- Eccentricity: 0.05462
- Orbital period (sidereal): 4.46 yr
- Mean anomaly: 64.086°
- Mean motion: 0° 13^{m} 16.007^{s} / day
- Inclination: 16.493°
- Longitude of ascending node: 26.031°
- Argument of perihelion: 147.816°
- Earth MOID: 1.5 AU (220 million km)
- T_{Jupiter}: 3.303

Physical characteristics
- Mean diameter: ~1.3 km 2 km
- Absolute magnitude (H): 17.2

(725095) 2008 TN_{208} (formerly known as 2010 GZ_{60}) was originally calculated by JPL to be a near-Earth asteroid approximately 2 kilometers (1.2 miles) in diameter. It is now known to be an asteroid from the inner region of the asteroid belt that does not get closer than 1.5 AU (220 million km) to Earth.

== Description ==
2010 GZ_{60} was observed for a period of 1.2 days by the NEOWISE mission of NASA's Wide-field Infrared Survey Explorer (WISE) space telescope during 5–6 April 2010. The asteroid has not been observed since. By mid November 2010 the uncertainty in the asteroid's position had grown to ±1 billion km. Based on the exceptionally poor orbit determination, the object was theoretically an Earth impactor because many impact solutions were compatible with the data. 2010 GZ_{60} missed several calculated impact dates.

In February 2018, the NEOWISE team reanalyzed their data and found an additional detection from 5 April 2010 that extended the observation arc by about three hours. As a result of this additional observation, the new orbit is closer to that of a main belt orbit and 2010 GZ_{60} was removed from the Sentry Risk Table on 23 February 2018.

=== Size ===
Not only was the orbit of 2010 GZ_{60} poorly known, but also its size was largely uncertain. There was no ground-based photometry. Based on the WISE flux, it obtained a size estimate of 2 km, which should be seen as more of an upper limit. The asteroid is now known to be closer to 1 km in diameter.

=== Pre-2018 orbit solutions ===
Until February 2018, 2010 GZ_{60} was identified in only 14 images, and the observations spanned a very short observation arc of 1 1/4 days during 5–6 April 2010. On 5 April 2010 the asteroid was estimated to have been 1.8 AU (270,000,000 km; 170,000,000 mi) from Earth with an uncertainty in the asteroid's distance of ±500 million km. With perihelion (closest approach to the Sun) estimated at 1.16 ± 3.5 AU, it was possible this asteroid barely comes inside the orbit of Jupiter which is located 5 AU from the Sun. However, due to the shortness of observations, the object's orbit was only known with the highest possible uncertainty parameter of 9 and an orbital note of E (Note: MPC's uncertainty code "E" stands for remark "Eccentricity assumed", as per Publishable Notes for Orbits of Minor Planets) thus the calculated orbital elements had a large margin of error.

Using the same 14 observations, the 2017 orbit calculations showed 481 potential close approaches to Earth between 2017 and 2116, with a cumulative rating of −0.76 on the Palermo Technical Impact Hazard Scale, which was the highest for any object on NASA's Sentry Risk Table during 2017 and early 2018. This high rating was a result of the object's estimated size and hundreds of potential close approaches to Earth, rather than any confidence in the prediction of any single virtual impactor. As of February 2018, there are 144 near-Earth objects known to have a diameter of at least 2 km. 2010 GZ_{60} was the largest object listed on the Sentry Risk Table.

2010 GZ_{60} missed 4 virtual impactor dates considered in the 2017 orbit calculations: 22 May 2017, 1 December 2017, 20 December 2017, and 8 January 2018. The next potential close approach by 2010 GZ_{60} was to be on 17 December 2018 with the odds of an Earth impact being 1 in 91 million. JPL Horizons nominal solution estimated that on 17 December 2018 the asteroid would be 1.9 AU (280,000,000 km; 180,000,000 mi) from Earth with a 3-sigma uncertainty of ±10 billion km. (Note: Neptune is 4.5 billion km from the Sun.)

Among the potential close approaches, the one on 10 February 2027 had the highest impact risk with a Palermo Scale rating of −1.98, which was the third-highest for any object on the Sentry Risk Table in early 2018. But the uncertainty in the geocentric distance on 10 February 2027 was ±17 billion km. The odds of this asteroid impacting Earth on 10 February 2027 were 1 in 4.8 million.

In 2017 the Minor Planet Center (MPC) used 11 of the 14 observations and listed 2010 GZ_{60} as a Mars-crosser with perihelion (closest approach to the Sun) at 1.37 AU.

=== 2018 orbit solution ===
In February 2018, the NEOWISE team reanalyzed their data and found an additional detection from 5 April 2010 that extended the observation arc by about three hours. This new observation resulted in the JPL Small-Body Database lifting the nominal perihelion (closest approach to the Sun) from 1.2 AU to 2.2 AU. Using the still poorly constrained 21 February 2018 orbit solution, JPL Horizons showed that on the discovery date of 5 April 2010 the asteroid is estimated to have been 2.2 AU (330,000,000 km; 200,000,000 mi) from Earth with an uncertainty in the asteroid's distance of ±350 million km and moving away from Earth at 13±41 km/s. Perihelion (closest approach to the Sun) was estimated to have occurred around September 2010. Aphelion (furthest distance from the Sun) was estimated to have occurred around February 2016. As of March 2018, the asteroid was estimated to be 7.5 AU (1.1 billion km) from Earth. (Note: Saturn is 1.3 billion km from the Sun.) Perihelion (closest approach to the Sun) may not occur again until August 2021.

Orbits computed with only a handful of observations can be unreliable. Short observation arcs can result in computer generated orbits rejecting some data unnecessarily. The 2018 JPL orbit determination shows a semi-major axis of 4.9 AU (albeit with a large 20 AU uncertainty) which would be near Jupiter's orbit. Such an orbit would be unstable unless it was a Jupiter trojan. Jupiter trojans have (4.6 AU < semi-major axis < 5.5 AU; eccentricity < 0.3). The 2018 nominal semi-major axis of 2010 GZ_{60} was just outside of the asteroid belt. As more observations came in, it was expected the orbit determination would be that of a main belt asteroid as they are by far the most numerous discovered objects in the Solar System and account for 94% of all known Small Solar System bodies. (Note: There are 990 thousand known minor planets of which 935 thousand objects are either inner, core, or outer main belt asteroids. Only 8 thousand objects are known as Jupiter trojans, unclassified asteroids, or Jupiter Family comets.) Outer main belt asteroids have a semi-major axis less than 4.6 AU. The orbital inclination is the easiest part of an orbit to determine and both JPL and the MPC list the inclination around 16.4 degrees.

The Minor Planet Center's 2018 orbit solution used 12 of the 15 observations and also listed the asteroid as a main belt asteroid. The new observation found in 2018 resulted in the MPC lifting perihelion (closest approach to the Sun) from 1.37 AU to 1.98 AU. The MPC solution estimated the asteroid came to perihelion 1.98 AU from the Sun around February 2009. On the discovery date of 5 April 2010, the asteroid was estimated to have been 2.3 AU from Earth and 2.6 AU from the Sun. As of March 2018, the asteroid was estimated to be 1.8 AU (270 million km) from Earth with opposition occurring around 19 March 2018 with a solar elongation of 167 degrees in the constellation of Virgo.

== See also ==
- 2004 BX159
