= List of minor planets: 585001–586000 =

The following is a partial list of minor planets, running from minor-planet number 585001 through 586000, inclusive. The primary data for this and other partial lists is based on JPL's "Small-Body Orbital Elements" and data available from the Minor Planet Center. Critical list information is also provided by the MPC, unless otherwise specified from Lowell Observatory. A detailed description of the table's columns and additional sources are given on the main page including a complete list of every page in this series, and a statistical break-up on the dynamical classification of minor planets.

Also see the summary list of all named bodies in numerical and alphabetical order, and the corresponding naming citations for the number range of this particular list. New namings may only be added to this list after official publication, as the preannouncement of names is condemned by the Working Group for Small Bodies Nomenclature of the International Astronomical Union.

Near-Earth obj.	MBA (inner)	MBA (outer)	Centaur
Mars-crosser	MBA (middle)	Jupiter trojan	Trans-Neptunian obj.
Unclassified

== 585001–585100 ==
Designation			Discovery			Properties		Ref
Permanent	Provisional	Named after	Date	Site	Discoverer(s)	Category	Diam.	Ref
585001	2017 SB_{82}	—	October 20, 2008	Kitt Peak	Spacewatch	·	1.8 km	MPC · JPL
585002	2017 SR_{83}	—	November 8, 2013	Kitt Peak	Spacewatch	WIT	840 m	MPC · JPL
585003	2017 SU_{84}	—	February 14, 2010	Kitt Peak	Spacewatch	AGN	1.0 km	MPC · JPL
585004	2017 SG_{85}	—	October 7, 2008	Mount Lemmon	Mount Lemmon Survey	·	2.0 km	MPC · JPL
585005	2017 SJ_{85}	—	October 1, 2008	Kitt Peak	Spacewatch	·	1.6 km	MPC · JPL
585006	2017 SU_{85}	—	March 31, 2008	Mount Lemmon	Mount Lemmon Survey	·	1.1 km	MPC · JPL
585007	2017 SE_{86}	—	November 26, 2014	Haleakala	Pan-STARRS 1	·	630 m	MPC · JPL
585008	2017 SF_{86}	—	February 21, 2002	Kitt Peak	Spacewatch	·	1.1 km	MPC · JPL
585009	2017 SJ_{86}	—	March 16, 2012	Mount Lemmon	Mount Lemmon Survey	·	1.0 km	MPC · JPL
585010	2017 SQ_{86}	—	March 6, 2011	Kitt Peak	Spacewatch	·	1.2 km	MPC · JPL
585011	2017 SE_{87}	—	November 17, 1995	Kitt Peak	Spacewatch	·	2.7 km	MPC · JPL
585012	2017 SL_{87}	—	September 6, 2004	Siding Spring	SSS	·	1.3 km	MPC · JPL
585013	2017 SU_{87}	—	December 19, 2009	Mount Lemmon	Mount Lemmon Survey	·	1.4 km	MPC · JPL
585014	2017 SC_{88}	—	September 24, 2011	Mount Lemmon	Mount Lemmon Survey	·	2.4 km	MPC · JPL
585015	2017 SD_{88}	—	March 12, 2008	Kitt Peak	Spacewatch	·	1.0 km	MPC · JPL
585016	2017 SK_{88}	—	October 10, 2004	Kitt Peak	Spacewatch	ADE	1.6 km	MPC · JPL
585017	2017 SM_{88}	—	January 25, 2006	Kitt Peak	Spacewatch	(5)	1.3 km	MPC · JPL
585018	2017 SJ_{89}	—	October 24, 2013	Mount Lemmon	Mount Lemmon Survey	·	1.2 km	MPC · JPL
585019	2017 SM_{89}	—	June 18, 2013	Haleakala	Pan-STARRS 1	NYS	900 m	MPC · JPL
585020	2017 ST_{89}	—	November 29, 2013	Nogales	M. Schwartz, P. R. Holvorcem	·	1.3 km	MPC · JPL
585021	2017 SB_{90}	—	August 27, 2006	Kitt Peak	Spacewatch	·	2.6 km	MPC · JPL
585022	2017 SC_{90}	—	January 25, 2015	Haleakala	Pan-STARRS 1	·	1.7 km	MPC · JPL
585023	2017 SN_{90}	—	November 12, 2013	Kitt Peak	Spacewatch	·	1.8 km	MPC · JPL
585024	2017 SW_{90}	—	August 31, 2017	Haleakala	Pan-STARRS 1	·	1.6 km	MPC · JPL
585025	2017 SR_{91}	—	November 3, 2013	Haleakala	Pan-STARRS 1	·	1.4 km	MPC · JPL
585026	2017 SK_{93}	—	September 13, 2007	Mount Lemmon	Mount Lemmon Survey	·	1.8 km	MPC · JPL
585027	2017 SX_{93}	—	November 1, 1999	Kitt Peak	Spacewatch	·	1.3 km	MPC · JPL
585028	2017 SD_{94}	—	May 23, 2006	Mount Lemmon	Mount Lemmon Survey	·	1.6 km	MPC · JPL
585029	2017 SL_{94}	—	February 27, 2006	Kitt Peak	Spacewatch	AGN	1.2 km	MPC · JPL
585030	2017 SQ_{94}	—	March 31, 2008	Kitt Peak	Spacewatch	·	1.2 km	MPC · JPL
585031	2017 SH_{95}	—	September 29, 2009	Mount Lemmon	Mount Lemmon Survey	·	1.4 km	MPC · JPL
585032	2017 SK_{95}	—	March 22, 2015	Haleakala	Pan-STARRS 1	·	1.7 km	MPC · JPL
585033	2017 SQ_{95}	—	September 17, 2013	Mount Lemmon	Mount Lemmon Survey	·	1.1 km	MPC · JPL
585034	2017 SA_{96}	—	October 25, 2013	Mount Lemmon	Mount Lemmon Survey	·	1.4 km	MPC · JPL
585035	2017 SN_{97}	—	October 2, 2003	Kitt Peak	Spacewatch	AGN	860 m	MPC · JPL
585036	2017 SB_{98}	—	August 13, 2013	Kitt Peak	Spacewatch	NYS	1.1 km	MPC · JPL
585037	2017 SM_{98}	—	September 28, 2003	Apache Point	SDSS	AGN	1.0 km	MPC · JPL
585038	2017 SO_{98}	—	July 27, 2009	Kitt Peak	Spacewatch	·	1.2 km	MPC · JPL
585039	2017 SZ_{98}	—	October 21, 2012	Haleakala	Pan-STARRS 1	·	2.0 km	MPC · JPL
585040	2017 SF_{99}	—	January 6, 2010	Mount Lemmon	Mount Lemmon Survey	NEM	2.1 km	MPC · JPL
585041	2017 SL_{101}	—	March 23, 2015	Haleakala	Pan-STARRS 1	·	1.8 km	MPC · JPL
585042	2017 SR_{101}	—	February 2, 2006	Mount Lemmon	Mount Lemmon Survey	·	1.5 km	MPC · JPL
585043	2017 ST_{101}	—	August 14, 2012	Haleakala	Pan-STARRS 1	·	2.0 km	MPC · JPL
585044	2017 SO_{102}	—	October 2, 2013	Kitt Peak	Spacewatch	·	1.0 km	MPC · JPL
585045	2017 SP_{102}	—	July 29, 2008	Mount Lemmon	Mount Lemmon Survey	·	1.6 km	MPC · JPL
585046	2017 SR_{102}	—	October 18, 2007	Mount Lemmon	Mount Lemmon Survey	·	1.7 km	MPC · JPL
585047	2017 SF_{104}	—	March 24, 2003	Kitt Peak	Spacewatch	·	1.7 km	MPC · JPL
585048	2017 SK_{104}	—	April 3, 2016	Haleakala	Pan-STARRS 1	·	2.1 km	MPC · JPL
585049	2017 SA_{105}	—	September 16, 2004	Anderson Mesa	LONEOS	·	1.1 km	MPC · JPL
585050	2017 SQ_{106}	—	August 26, 2003	Črni Vrh	Mikuž, H.	·	2.0 km	MPC · JPL
585051	2017 SM_{107}	—	March 23, 2003	Palomar	NEAT	·	1.9 km	MPC · JPL
585052	2017 SV_{107}	—	November 10, 2009	Mount Lemmon	Mount Lemmon Survey	EUN	1.0 km	MPC · JPL
585053	2017 SW_{107}	—	August 25, 2012	Kitt Peak	Spacewatch	·	2.7 km	MPC · JPL
585054	2017 SQ_{109}	—	September 10, 2004	Kitt Peak	Spacewatch	·	1.7 km	MPC · JPL
585055	2017 ST_{109}	—	October 11, 2012	Haleakala	Pan-STARRS 1	·	2.5 km	MPC · JPL
585056	2017 SK_{111}	—	May 25, 2006	Kitt Peak	Spacewatch	KOR	1.4 km	MPC · JPL
585057	2017 SW_{111}	—	April 3, 2011	Haleakala	Pan-STARRS 1	·	1.5 km	MPC · JPL
585058	2017 SK_{112}	—	April 4, 2003	Kitt Peak	Spacewatch	MIS	2.1 km	MPC · JPL
585059	2017 SY_{112}	—	June 10, 2007	Kitt Peak	Spacewatch	·	1.5 km	MPC · JPL
585060	2017 SP_{113}	—	November 11, 2001	Apache Point	SDSS Collaboration	·	3.4 km	MPC · JPL
585061	2017 SD_{115}	—	January 28, 2015	Haleakala	Pan-STARRS 1	·	730 m	MPC · JPL
585062	2017 SU_{115}	—	September 20, 2001	Apache Point	SDSS Collaboration	·	760 m	MPC · JPL
585063	2017 SM_{117}	—	October 9, 2004	Kitt Peak	Spacewatch	·	630 m	MPC · JPL
585064	2017 SJ_{126}	—	February 6, 2010	Mount Lemmon	Mount Lemmon Survey	·	1.6 km	MPC · JPL
585065	2017 SS_{126}	—	February 14, 2010	Mount Lemmon	Mount Lemmon Survey	PAD	1.5 km	MPC · JPL
585066	2017 SQ_{127}	—	December 3, 2008	Kitt Peak	Spacewatch	·	2.0 km	MPC · JPL
585067	2017 SZ_{127}	—	February 24, 2015	Haleakala	Pan-STARRS 1	·	1.5 km	MPC · JPL
585068	2017 SH_{129}	—	March 26, 2014	Mount Lemmon	Mount Lemmon Survey	·	3.2 km	MPC · JPL
585069	2017 SV_{129}	—	November 3, 2005	Mount Lemmon	Mount Lemmon Survey	·	1 km	MPC · JPL
585070	2017 SF_{130}	—	September 25, 2006	Kitt Peak	Spacewatch	·	2.6 km	MPC · JPL
585071	2017 SR_{131}	—	June 22, 1995	Kitt Peak	Spacewatch	(1547)	1.1 km	MPC · JPL
585072	2017 ST_{131}	—	October 31, 2010	Kitt Peak	Spacewatch	NYS	670 m	MPC · JPL
585073	2017 SZ_{131}	—	October 26, 2013	Kitt Peak	Spacewatch	·	980 m	MPC · JPL
585074	2017 SM_{132}	—	March 14, 2007	Mount Lemmon	Mount Lemmon Survey	·	1.3 km	MPC · JPL
585075	2017 SS_{196}	—	October 23, 2012	Mount Lemmon	Mount Lemmon Survey	KOR	1.2 km	MPC · JPL
585076	2017 SH_{197}	—	January 28, 2015	Haleakala	Pan-STARRS 1	WIT	710 m	MPC · JPL
585077	2017 SW_{197}	—	September 17, 2017	Haleakala	Pan-STARRS 1	·	1.5 km	MPC · JPL
585078	2017 SJ_{198}	—	September 30, 2017	Haleakala	Pan-STARRS 1	EUN	1.0 km	MPC · JPL
585079	2017 SD_{199}	—	September 19, 2017	Haleakala	Pan-STARRS 1	·	1.5 km	MPC · JPL
585080	2017 SP_{200}	—	September 23, 2017	Haleakala	Pan-STARRS 1	·	1.3 km	MPC · JPL
585081	2017 SJ_{201}	—	September 23, 2017	Haleakala	Pan-STARRS 1	WIT	710 m	MPC · JPL
585082	2017 ST_{202}	—	September 24, 2017	Mount Lemmon	Mount Lemmon Survey	MRX	940 m	MPC · JPL
585083	2017 SP_{204}	—	September 26, 2017	Haleakala	Pan-STARRS 1	·	500 m	MPC · JPL
585084	2017 SJ_{205}	—	September 26, 2017	Haleakala	Pan-STARRS 1	·	1.5 km	MPC · JPL
585085	2017 SR_{209}	—	September 24, 2017	Haleakala	Pan-STARRS 1	·	1.5 km	MPC · JPL
585086	2017 SR_{218}	—	September 16, 2017	Haleakala	Pan-STARRS 1	·	2.6 km	MPC · JPL
585087	2017 TV	—	December 4, 2007	Mount Lemmon	Mount Lemmon Survey	H	540 m	MPC · JPL
585088	2017 TK_{3}	—	November 9, 2009	Mount Lemmon	Mount Lemmon Survey	H	440 m	MPC · JPL
585089	2017 TJ_{7}	—	September 24, 2009	Catalina	CSS	·	1.1 km	MPC · JPL
585090	2017 TB_{9}	—	September 26, 2003	Apache Point	SDSS	TIN	1.0 km	MPC · JPL
585091	2017 TX_{9}	—	November 6, 1994	Kitt Peak	Spacewatch	·	1.4 km	MPC · JPL
585092	2017 TK_{11}	—	April 20, 2012	Mount Lemmon	Mount Lemmon Survey	·	1.2 km	MPC · JPL
585093	2017 TF_{13}	—	September 28, 2003	Kitt Peak	Spacewatch	·	2.1 km	MPC · JPL
585094	2017 TP_{13}	—	March 3, 2000	Apache Point	SDSS Collaboration	·	1.9 km	MPC · JPL
585095	2017 TF_{17}	—	February 26, 2014	Haleakala	Pan-STARRS 1	·	2.0 km	MPC · JPL
585096	2017 TJ_{25}	—	October 14, 2017	Mount Lemmon	Mount Lemmon Survey	·	500 m	MPC · JPL
585097	2017 TH_{30}	—	September 17, 2003	Kitt Peak	Spacewatch	PAD	1.1 km	MPC · JPL
585098	2017 TT_{35}	—	October 2, 2017	Haleakala	Pan-STARRS 1	TIR	2.5 km	MPC · JPL
585099	2017 UD_{4}	—	August 19, 2012	Črni Vrh	Mikuž, B.	H	550 m	MPC · JPL
585100	2017 UF_{9}	—	November 2, 2006	Kitt Peak	Spacewatch	·	3.2 km	MPC · JPL

== 585101–585200 ==
back to top

Designation			Discovery			Properties		Ref
Permanent	Provisional	Named after	Date	Site	Discoverer(s)	Category	Diam.	Ref
585101	2017 UU_{9}	—	September 28, 2008	Socorro	LINEAR	·	1.6 km	MPC · JPL
585102	2017 UX_{9}	—	August 8, 2013	Mauna Kea	D. J. Tholen	·	1.9 km	MPC · JPL
585103	2017 UB_{10}	—	October 1, 2003	Kitt Peak	Spacewatch	GEF	1.3 km	MPC · JPL
585104	2017 UC_{10}	—	September 21, 2017	Haleakala	Pan-STARRS 1	·	1.5 km	MPC · JPL
585105	2017 UF_{10}	—	August 17, 2006	Palomar	NEAT	·	1.1 km	MPC · JPL
585106	2017 UJ_{11}	—	May 1, 2006	Mauna Kea	P. A. Wiegert	HOF	2.2 km	MPC · JPL
585107	2017 UO_{11}	—	February 20, 2015	Haleakala	Pan-STARRS 1	·	3.2 km	MPC · JPL
585108	2017 UR_{11}	—	October 1, 2008	Mount Lemmon	Mount Lemmon Survey	·	1.6 km	MPC · JPL
585109	2017 UO_{12}	—	October 16, 2012	Oukaïmeden	C. Rinner	·	2.0 km	MPC · JPL
585110	2017 UL_{14}	—	September 23, 2008	Kitt Peak	Spacewatch	·	2.0 km	MPC · JPL
585111	2017 UC_{15}	—	May 16, 2012	Mount Lemmon	Mount Lemmon Survey	·	1.1 km	MPC · JPL
585112	2017 UF_{15}	—	July 29, 2008	Mount Lemmon	Mount Lemmon Survey	·	1.7 km	MPC · JPL
585113	2017 UH_{15}	—	November 8, 2013	Kitt Peak	Spacewatch	(5)	1.1 km	MPC · JPL
585114	2017 UX_{15}	—	September 21, 2001	Kitt Peak	Spacewatch	·	1.7 km	MPC · JPL
585115	2017 UB_{19}	—	September 19, 2011	Mount Lemmon	Mount Lemmon Survey	·	2.8 km	MPC · JPL
585116	2017 UF_{19}	—	November 28, 2013	Mount Lemmon	Mount Lemmon Survey	·	1.5 km	MPC · JPL
585117	2017 UU_{23}	—	October 18, 2012	Haleakala	Pan-STARRS 1	·	1.7 km	MPC · JPL
585118	2017 UE_{24}	—	September 30, 2006	Mount Lemmon	Mount Lemmon Survey	MAS	620 m	MPC · JPL
585119	2017 UV_{24}	—	October 19, 2012	Haleakala	Pan-STARRS 1	·	2.7 km	MPC · JPL
585120	2017 UE_{25}	—	August 23, 2003	Cerro Tololo	Deep Ecliptic Survey	AGN	1.2 km	MPC · JPL
585121	2017 UG_{25}	—	September 12, 2013	Mount Lemmon	Mount Lemmon Survey	·	1.2 km	MPC · JPL
585122	2017 UO_{25}	—	December 27, 2005	Kitt Peak	Spacewatch	(5)	950 m	MPC · JPL
585123	2017 UP_{25}	—	May 14, 2008	Kitt Peak	Spacewatch	·	990 m	MPC · JPL
585124	2017 UT_{26}	—	September 20, 2006	Kitt Peak	Spacewatch	·	2.0 km	MPC · JPL
585125	2017 UW_{26}	—	April 21, 2009	Mount Lemmon	Mount Lemmon Survey	VER	2.3 km	MPC · JPL
585126	2017 UM_{27}	—	November 22, 2012	Kitt Peak	Spacewatch	·	2.0 km	MPC · JPL
585127	2017 UV_{28}	—	September 16, 2003	Kitt Peak	Spacewatch	·	590 m	MPC · JPL
585128	2017 UA_{29}	—	November 2, 2013	Mount Lemmon	Mount Lemmon Survey	·	1.4 km	MPC · JPL
585129	2017 UN_{29}	—	March 11, 2007	Kitt Peak	Spacewatch	MAR	910 m	MPC · JPL
585130	2017 UF_{30}	—	October 31, 2008	Mount Lemmon	Mount Lemmon Survey	·	1.7 km	MPC · JPL
585131	2017 UL_{30}	—	September 17, 2012	Mount Lemmon	Mount Lemmon Survey	·	1.9 km	MPC · JPL
585132	2017 UU_{31}	—	June 7, 2016	Haleakala	Pan-STARRS 1	·	1.3 km	MPC · JPL
585133	2017 UG_{32}	—	September 25, 2008	Mount Lemmon	Mount Lemmon Survey	WIT	840 m	MPC · JPL
585134	2017 UC_{34}	—	November 26, 2013	Mount Lemmon	Mount Lemmon Survey	MIS	2.2 km	MPC · JPL
585135	2017 UN_{36}	—	September 18, 2003	Kitt Peak	Spacewatch	·	1.8 km	MPC · JPL
585136	2017 UX_{36}	—	October 11, 2010	Catalina	CSS	·	770 m	MPC · JPL
585137	2017 UG_{37}	—	October 12, 1999	Kitt Peak	Spacewatch	·	1.8 km	MPC · JPL
585138	2017 UC_{39}	—	September 23, 2000	Socorro	LINEAR	(5)	1.3 km	MPC · JPL
585139	2017 UT_{39}	—	June 7, 2016	Haleakala	Pan-STARRS 1	·	3.5 km	MPC · JPL
585140	2017 UX_{43}	—	August 6, 2004	Palomar	NEAT	BAR	1.2 km	MPC · JPL
585141	2017 UZ_{43}	—	December 10, 2012	Haleakala	Pan-STARRS 1	H	500 m	MPC · JPL
585142	2017 UW_{45}	—	November 27, 2013	Haleakala	Pan-STARRS 1	·	1.3 km	MPC · JPL
585143	2017 UX_{45}	—	August 10, 2012	Kitt Peak	Spacewatch	·	1.3 km	MPC · JPL
585144	2017 UD_{46}	—	August 25, 2012	Mount Lemmon	Mount Lemmon Survey	·	1.7 km	MPC · JPL
585145	2017 UG_{46}	—	November 8, 2008	Mount Lemmon	Mount Lemmon Survey	WIT	760 m	MPC · JPL
585146	2017 UW_{46}	—	July 5, 2016	Haleakala	Pan-STARRS 1	EOS	1.4 km	MPC · JPL
585147	2017 UY_{46}	—	December 20, 2007	Kitt Peak	Spacewatch	·	1.8 km	MPC · JPL
585148	2017 UE_{47}	—	January 26, 2014	Haleakala	Pan-STARRS 1	·	1.4 km	MPC · JPL
585149	2017 UY_{48}	—	February 27, 2014	Haleakala	Pan-STARRS 1	EOS	1.3 km	MPC · JPL
585150	2017 UR_{49}	—	March 28, 2015	Haleakala	Pan-STARRS 1	·	2.2 km	MPC · JPL
585151	2017 UN_{65}	—	October 9, 2008	Kitt Peak	Spacewatch	·	1.2 km	MPC · JPL
585152	2017 UX_{92}	—	October 9, 2012	Mount Lemmon	Mount Lemmon Survey	HOF	1.8 km	MPC · JPL
585153	2017 UB_{93}	—	October 27, 2017	Haleakala	Pan-STARRS 1	·	2.4 km	MPC · JPL
585154	2017 UR_{93}	—	September 19, 2001	Kitt Peak	Spacewatch	EOS	1.4 km	MPC · JPL
585155	2017 UW_{93}	—	May 8, 2011	Mount Lemmon	Mount Lemmon Survey	·	1.5 km	MPC · JPL
585156	2017 UK_{94}	—	October 29, 2017	Haleakala	Pan-STARRS 1	·	1.9 km	MPC · JPL
585157	2017 UB_{95}	—	September 23, 2017	Haleakala	Pan-STARRS 1	·	500 m	MPC · JPL
585158	2017 UO_{95}	—	April 23, 2015	Haleakala	Pan-STARRS 1	·	2.4 km	MPC · JPL
585159	2017 UF_{97}	—	April 18, 2015	Cerro Tololo	DECam	·	1.5 km	MPC · JPL
585160	2017 US_{97}	—	November 24, 2008	Kitt Peak	Spacewatch	HOF	2.2 km	MPC · JPL
585161	2017 US_{98}	—	September 17, 2012	Mount Lemmon	Mount Lemmon Survey	·	1.4 km	MPC · JPL
585162	2017 UR_{103}	—	October 29, 2017	Haleakala	Pan-STARRS 1	EOS	1.2 km	MPC · JPL
585163	2017 UG_{108}	—	October 21, 2012	Kitt Peak	Spacewatch	·	1.4 km	MPC · JPL
585164	2017 UH_{108}	—	September 17, 2017	Haleakala	Pan-STARRS 1	KOR	1.1 km	MPC · JPL
585165	2017 UK_{118}	—	October 23, 2017	Mount Lemmon	Mount Lemmon Survey	EOS	1.3 km	MPC · JPL
585166	2017 UL_{120}	—	October 23, 2017	Mount Lemmon	Mount Lemmon Survey	·	2.4 km	MPC · JPL
585167	2017 VW_{2}	—	September 26, 2008	Mount Lemmon	Mount Lemmon Survey	·	1.7 km	MPC · JPL
585168	2017 VX_{2}	—	September 23, 2008	Mount Lemmon	Mount Lemmon Survey	·	1.4 km	MPC · JPL
585169	2017 VB_{3}	—	September 29, 2003	Kitt Peak	Spacewatch	AGN	920 m	MPC · JPL
585170	2017 VQ_{3}	—	February 2, 2002	Palomar	NEAT	·	1.1 km	MPC · JPL
585171	2017 VA_{4}	—	October 6, 2008	Catalina	CSS	·	1.4 km	MPC · JPL
585172	2017 VC_{6}	—	November 26, 2012	Mount Lemmon	Mount Lemmon Survey	EOS	2.0 km	MPC · JPL
585173	2017 VM_{6}	—	November 20, 2008	Kitt Peak	Spacewatch	MRX	1.0 km	MPC · JPL
585174	2017 VN_{6}	—	September 18, 2001	Apache Point	SDSS Collaboration	·	2.1 km	MPC · JPL
585175	2017 VO_{6}	—	November 30, 2003	Kitt Peak	Spacewatch	·	2.0 km	MPC · JPL
585176	2017 VQ_{6}	—	October 24, 2008	Catalina	CSS	·	2.0 km	MPC · JPL
585177	2017 VY_{6}	—	September 25, 2017	Haleakala	Pan-STARRS 1	·	1.6 km	MPC · JPL
585178	2017 VZ_{6}	—	January 10, 2013	Mount Lemmon	Mount Lemmon Survey	·	2.6 km	MPC · JPL
585179	2017 VE_{7}	—	January 10, 2013	Haleakala	Pan-STARRS 1	·	3.6 km	MPC · JPL
585180	2017 VP_{7}	—	November 7, 2008	Mount Lemmon	Mount Lemmon Survey	·	1.5 km	MPC · JPL
585181	2017 VA_{9}	—	September 24, 2011	Mount Lemmon	Mount Lemmon Survey	VER	2.2 km	MPC · JPL
585182	2017 VZ_{10}	—	January 13, 2013	Nogales	M. Schwartz, P. R. Holvorcem	·	2.9 km	MPC · JPL
585183	2017 VK_{11}	—	August 16, 2012	Haleakala	Pan-STARRS 1	NEM	1.5 km	MPC · JPL
585184	2017 VM_{12}	—	June 4, 2016	Mount Lemmon	Mount Lemmon Survey	·	1.5 km	MPC · JPL
585185	2017 VT_{12}	—	November 12, 2017	Mount Lemmon	Mount Lemmon Survey	APO	290 m	MPC · JPL
585186	2017 VM_{14}	—	October 20, 2017	Mount Lemmon	Mount Lemmon Survey	H	410 m	MPC · JPL
585187	2017 VX_{15}	—	September 19, 2011	Mount Lemmon	Mount Lemmon Survey	LIX	3.2 km	MPC · JPL
585188	2017 VY_{15}	—	December 16, 2007	Mount Lemmon	Mount Lemmon Survey	(31811)	2.7 km	MPC · JPL
585189	2017 VJ_{16}	—	June 16, 2010	Mount Lemmon	Mount Lemmon Survey	·	2.6 km	MPC · JPL
585190	2017 VT_{16}	—	February 27, 2015	Haleakala	Pan-STARRS 1	·	1.9 km	MPC · JPL
585191	2017 VY_{16}	—	April 1, 2011	Mount Lemmon	Mount Lemmon Survey	·	910 m	MPC · JPL
585192	2017 VN_{17}	—	December 2, 2005	Mauna Kea	A. Boattini	PAD	1.4 km	MPC · JPL
585193	2017 VA_{18}	—	April 2, 2009	Kitt Peak	Spacewatch	·	690 m	MPC · JPL
585194	2017 VR_{18}	—	September 24, 2012	Mount Lemmon	Mount Lemmon Survey	AGN	950 m	MPC · JPL
585195	2017 VC_{19}	—	October 10, 2004	Kitt Peak	Spacewatch	·	1.2 km	MPC · JPL
585196	2017 VY_{19}	—	December 3, 2012	Mount Lemmon	Mount Lemmon Survey	·	2.1 km	MPC · JPL
585197	2017 VL_{20}	—	September 19, 2003	Kitt Peak	Spacewatch	·	1.5 km	MPC · JPL
585198	2017 VP_{21}	—	February 20, 2015	Haleakala	Pan-STARRS 1	·	1.8 km	MPC · JPL
585199	2017 VK_{22}	—	March 27, 2003	Kitt Peak	Spacewatch	·	2.4 km	MPC · JPL
585200	2017 VW_{22}	—	May 21, 2012	Mount Lemmon	Mount Lemmon Survey	·	1.6 km	MPC · JPL

== 585201–585300 ==
back to top

Designation			Discovery			Properties		Ref
Permanent	Provisional	Named after	Date	Site	Discoverer(s)	Category	Diam.	Ref
585201	2017 VD_{23}	—	December 2, 2012	Mount Lemmon	Mount Lemmon Survey	·	2.3 km	MPC · JPL
585202	2017 VG_{23}	—	November 10, 2009	Mount Lemmon	Mount Lemmon Survey	·	900 m	MPC · JPL
585203	2017 VT_{24}	—	October 21, 2008	Kitt Peak	Spacewatch	PAD	1.5 km	MPC · JPL
585204	2017 VU_{25}	—	October 14, 2001	Kitt Peak	Spacewatch	·	2.2 km	MPC · JPL
585205	2017 VD_{26}	—	June 13, 2015	Haleakala	Pan-STARRS 1	·	2.9 km	MPC · JPL
585206	2017 VP_{26}	—	December 11, 2014	Mount Lemmon	Mount Lemmon Survey	·	540 m	MPC · JPL
585207	2017 VA_{27}	—	June 9, 2011	Mount Lemmon	Mount Lemmon Survey	·	1.6 km	MPC · JPL
585208	2017 VE_{27}	—	September 14, 2007	Kitt Peak	Spacewatch	·	1.4 km	MPC · JPL
585209	2017 VA_{28}	—	November 5, 1996	Kitt Peak	Spacewatch	·	770 m	MPC · JPL
585210	2017 VK_{28}	—	March 12, 2010	Kitt Peak	Spacewatch	AGN	1.1 km	MPC · JPL
585211	2017 VO_{28}	—	March 21, 2009	Kitt Peak	Spacewatch	·	2.8 km	MPC · JPL
585212	2017 VP_{28}	—	March 28, 2016	Mount Lemmon	Mount Lemmon Survey	·	690 m	MPC · JPL
585213	2017 VQ_{28}	—	September 22, 2008	Kitt Peak	Spacewatch	·	1.7 km	MPC · JPL
585214	2017 VC_{29}	—	September 24, 2012	Kitt Peak	Spacewatch	·	1.6 km	MPC · JPL
585215	2017 VE_{29}	—	September 30, 2003	Kitt Peak	Spacewatch	HOF	2.0 km	MPC · JPL
585216	2017 VQ_{29}	—	September 14, 2007	Mount Lemmon	Mount Lemmon Survey	KOR	920 m	MPC · JPL
585217	2017 VU_{29}	—	September 18, 2012	Mount Lemmon	Mount Lemmon Survey	HOF	2.3 km	MPC · JPL
585218	2017 VS_{31}	—	February 17, 2015	Haleakala	Pan-STARRS 1	·	1.6 km	MPC · JPL
585219	2017 VU_{32}	—	July 21, 2006	Mount Lemmon	Mount Lemmon Survey	·	2.1 km	MPC · JPL
585220	2017 VC_{34}	—	May 28, 2014	Haleakala	Pan-STARRS 1	H	400 m	MPC · JPL
585221	2017 VL_{34}	—	February 10, 2008	Mount Lemmon	Mount Lemmon Survey	·	3.7 km	MPC · JPL
585222	2017 VW_{38}	—	February 24, 2014	Haleakala	Pan-STARRS 1	EOS	1.3 km	MPC · JPL
585223	2017 VF_{41}	—	November 10, 2017	Haleakala	Pan-STARRS 1	·	2.0 km	MPC · JPL
585224	2017 WS_{2}	—	October 19, 2017	Haleakala	Pan-STARRS 1	·	1.7 km	MPC · JPL
585225	2017 WS_{3}	—	December 22, 2006	Mount Lemmon	Mount Lemmon Survey	·	2.4 km	MPC · JPL
585226	2017 WT_{3}	—	September 21, 2012	Kitt Peak	Spacewatch	HOF	2.1 km	MPC · JPL
585227	2017 WL_{4}	—	October 19, 2006	Mount Lemmon	Mount Lemmon Survey	EOS	1.7 km	MPC · JPL
585228	2017 WT_{4}	—	October 8, 2012	Haleakala	Pan-STARRS 1	·	1.9 km	MPC · JPL
585229	2017 WW_{5}	—	August 2, 2016	Haleakala	Pan-STARRS 1	·	3.4 km	MPC · JPL
585230	2017 WJ_{6}	—	June 8, 2011	Mount Lemmon	Mount Lemmon Survey	·	2.3 km	MPC · JPL
585231	2017 WD_{8}	—	August 14, 2016	Haleakala	Pan-STARRS 1	EOS	1.6 km	MPC · JPL
585232	2017 WL_{9}	—	December 2, 2005	Kitt Peak	Spacewatch	·	1.5 km	MPC · JPL
585233	2017 WA_{10}	—	December 19, 2009	Kitt Peak	Spacewatch	(5)	950 m	MPC · JPL
585234	2017 WF_{17}	—	October 30, 2011	ESA OGS	ESA OGS	·	2.2 km	MPC · JPL
585235	2017 WF_{18}	—	October 9, 2008	Kitt Peak	Spacewatch	·	1.4 km	MPC · JPL
585236	2017 WX_{18}	—	March 11, 2011	Mount Lemmon	Mount Lemmon Survey	MAR	820 m	MPC · JPL
585237	2017 WC_{19}	—	January 4, 2006	Kitt Peak	Spacewatch	·	1.3 km	MPC · JPL
585238	2017 WU_{19}	—	November 26, 2013	Mount Lemmon	Mount Lemmon Survey	·	1.2 km	MPC · JPL
585239	2017 WU_{21}	—	November 4, 2004	Catalina	CSS	·	1.4 km	MPC · JPL
585240	2017 WE_{25}	—	January 25, 2003	Palomar	NEAT	·	2.4 km	MPC · JPL
585241	2017 WD_{27}	—	November 25, 2006	Mount Lemmon	Mount Lemmon Survey	·	2.5 km	MPC · JPL
585242	2017 WY_{29}	—	November 19, 1995	Kitt Peak	Spacewatch	·	1.3 km	MPC · JPL
585243	2017 WZ_{41}	—	August 1, 2016	Haleakala	Pan-STARRS 1	EOS	1.5 km	MPC · JPL
585244	2017 WG_{43}	—	February 14, 2009	Mount Lemmon	Mount Lemmon Survey	KOR	1.2 km	MPC · JPL
585245	2017 XW_{4}	—	January 10, 2013	Haleakala	Pan-STARRS 1	·	2.7 km	MPC · JPL
585246	2017 XF_{5}	—	June 8, 2016	Haleakala	Pan-STARRS 1	EOS	1.4 km	MPC · JPL
585247	2017 XU_{5}	—	May 12, 2015	Mount Lemmon	Mount Lemmon Survey	·	1.6 km	MPC · JPL
585248	2017 XW_{6}	—	August 29, 2016	Mount Lemmon	Mount Lemmon Survey	·	2.1 km	MPC · JPL
585249	2017 XN_{7}	—	August 30, 2016	Mount Lemmon	Mount Lemmon Survey	·	2.6 km	MPC · JPL
585250	2017 XH_{8}	—	April 8, 2014	Mount Lemmon	Mount Lemmon Survey	·	3.0 km	MPC · JPL
585251	2017 XK_{8}	—	November 1, 2006	Kitt Peak	Spacewatch	EOS	1.4 km	MPC · JPL
585252	2017 XH_{10}	—	March 12, 2014	Mount Lemmon	Mount Lemmon Survey	EOS	1.5 km	MPC · JPL
585253	2017 XT_{12}	—	November 26, 2013	Haleakala	Pan-STARRS 1	·	860 m	MPC · JPL
585254	2017 XA_{13}	—	April 2, 2011	Mount Lemmon	Mount Lemmon Survey	·	1.5 km	MPC · JPL
585255	2017 XU_{13}	—	May 21, 2015	Haleakala	Pan-STARRS 1	·	1.6 km	MPC · JPL
585256	2017 XZ_{13}	—	November 6, 2012	Mount Lemmon	Mount Lemmon Survey	·	1.6 km	MPC · JPL
585257	2017 XB_{14}	—	November 12, 2012	Mount Lemmon	Mount Lemmon Survey	EOS	1.4 km	MPC · JPL
585258	2017 XE_{17}	—	February 26, 2008	Mount Lemmon	Mount Lemmon Survey	·	560 m	MPC · JPL
585259	2017 XG_{18}	—	October 22, 2012	Haleakala	Pan-STARRS 1	·	1.7 km	MPC · JPL
585260	2017 XR_{18}	—	February 18, 2008	Mount Lemmon	Mount Lemmon Survey	(2076)	610 m	MPC · JPL
585261	2017 XC_{20}	—	October 20, 2017	Mount Lemmon	Mount Lemmon Survey	·	1.5 km	MPC · JPL
585262	2017 XO_{20}	—	September 25, 2008	Mount Lemmon	Mount Lemmon Survey	·	1.1 km	MPC · JPL
585263	2017 XA_{22}	—	August 10, 2007	Kitt Peak	Spacewatch	·	1.6 km	MPC · JPL
585264	2017 XR_{24}	—	February 28, 2014	Haleakala	Pan-STARRS 1	·	1.3 km	MPC · JPL
585265	2017 XX_{26}	—	September 17, 1995	Kitt Peak	Spacewatch	·	1.9 km	MPC · JPL
585266	2017 XA_{27}	—	September 16, 2006	Kitt Peak	Spacewatch	MAS	560 m	MPC · JPL
585267	2017 XG_{27}	—	December 22, 2012	Haleakala	Pan-STARRS 1	·	3.1 km	MPC · JPL
585268	2017 XQ_{27}	—	December 6, 2008	Kitt Peak	Spacewatch	·	1.6 km	MPC · JPL
585269	2017 XB_{29}	—	June 16, 2012	Mount Lemmon	Mount Lemmon Survey	·	1.1 km	MPC · JPL
585270	2017 XH_{30}	—	May 24, 2015	Haleakala	Pan-STARRS 1	·	2.2 km	MPC · JPL
585271	2017 XK_{31}	—	October 10, 2007	Mount Lemmon	Mount Lemmon Survey	·	520 m	MPC · JPL
585272	2017 XT_{31}	—	November 20, 2008	Mount Lemmon	Mount Lemmon Survey	·	1.4 km	MPC · JPL
585273	2017 XW_{32}	—	September 15, 2007	Mount Lemmon	Mount Lemmon Survey	·	430 m	MPC · JPL
585274	2017 XF_{34}	—	July 12, 2002	Palomar	NEAT	AGN	1.2 km	MPC · JPL
585275	2017 XR_{35}	—	November 1, 2008	Kitt Peak	Spacewatch	·	1.3 km	MPC · JPL
585276	2017 XT_{35}	—	December 6, 2013	Haleakala	Pan-STARRS 1	EUN	1.0 km	MPC · JPL
585277	2017 XA_{36}	—	November 13, 2007	Kitt Peak	Spacewatch	·	2.0 km	MPC · JPL
585278	2017 XV_{36}	—	April 15, 2007	Bergisch Gladbach	W. Bickel	EUN	1.1 km	MPC · JPL
585279	2017 XS_{37}	—	November 14, 2017	Mount Lemmon	Mount Lemmon Survey	·	1.8 km	MPC · JPL
585280	2017 XV_{40}	—	March 24, 2014	Haleakala	Pan-STARRS 1	VER	2.0 km	MPC · JPL
585281	2017 XY_{40}	—	September 27, 2006	Kitt Peak	Spacewatch	·	1.8 km	MPC · JPL
585282	2017 XS_{41}	—	September 25, 2012	Mount Lemmon	Mount Lemmon Survey	EOS	1.5 km	MPC · JPL
585283	2017 XT_{41}	—	December 3, 2012	Mount Lemmon	Mount Lemmon Survey	EOS	1.3 km	MPC · JPL
585284	2017 XX_{41}	—	October 3, 2006	Mount Lemmon	Mount Lemmon Survey	·	2.8 km	MPC · JPL
585285	2017 XC_{42}	—	August 25, 2012	Haleakala	Pan-STARRS 1	·	1.3 km	MPC · JPL
585286	2017 XV_{42}	—	October 19, 2003	Kitt Peak	Spacewatch	·	1.3 km	MPC · JPL
585287	2017 XY_{42}	—	February 11, 2014	Mount Lemmon	Mount Lemmon Survey	EOS	1.7 km	MPC · JPL
585288	2017 XB_{43}	—	October 29, 2008	Mount Lemmon	Mount Lemmon Survey	·	1.6 km	MPC · JPL
585289	2017 XL_{43}	—	October 18, 2003	Palomar	NEAT	·	1.6 km	MPC · JPL
585290	2017 XQ_{43}	—	June 30, 2013	Haleakala	Pan-STARRS 1	·	610 m	MPC · JPL
585291	2017 XT_{45}	—	February 24, 2014	Haleakala	Pan-STARRS 1	·	2.2 km	MPC · JPL
585292	2017 XL_{47}	—	April 5, 2014	Haleakala	Pan-STARRS 1	·	2.3 km	MPC · JPL
585293	2017 XG_{49}	—	May 27, 2012	Mount Lemmon	Mount Lemmon Survey	·	1.3 km	MPC · JPL
585294	2017 XP_{49}	—	December 13, 2012	Mount Lemmon	Mount Lemmon Survey	·	1.5 km	MPC · JPL
585295	2017 XM_{51}	—	October 23, 2012	Mount Lemmon	Mount Lemmon Survey	·	1.8 km	MPC · JPL
585296	2017 XD_{52}	—	October 22, 2017	Mount Lemmon	Mount Lemmon Survey	·	1.3 km	MPC · JPL
585297	2017 XY_{52}	—	October 28, 2017	Haleakala	Pan-STARRS 1	·	1.5 km	MPC · JPL
585298	2017 XM_{54}	—	October 30, 2017	Haleakala	Pan-STARRS 1	KOR	1.3 km	MPC · JPL
585299	2017 XJ_{55}	—	August 30, 2016	Mount Lemmon	Mount Lemmon Survey	EOS	2.1 km	MPC · JPL
585300	2017 XC_{57}	—	October 29, 2008	Kitt Peak	Spacewatch	(12739)	1.6 km	MPC · JPL

== 585301–585400 ==
back to top

Designation			Discovery			Properties		Ref
Permanent	Provisional	Named after	Date	Site	Discoverer(s)	Category	Diam.	Ref
585301	2017 XW_{57}	—	October 20, 2003	Palomar	NEAT	AGN	1.0 km	MPC · JPL
585302	2017 XZ_{57}	—	June 14, 2012	Mount Lemmon	Mount Lemmon Survey	·	1.2 km	MPC · JPL
585303	2017 XE_{58}	—	April 26, 2006	Mount Lemmon	Mount Lemmon Survey	·	610 m	MPC · JPL
585304	2017 XH_{58}	—	August 7, 2016	Haleakala	Pan-STARRS 1	EOS	1.4 km	MPC · JPL
585305	2017 XN_{62}	—	December 4, 2007	Kitt Peak	Spacewatch	EOS	1.5 km	MPC · JPL
585306	2017 XB_{71}	—	February 8, 2011	Mount Lemmon	Mount Lemmon Survey	·	860 m	MPC · JPL
585307	2017 XD_{71}	—	October 16, 2012	Mount Lemmon	Mount Lemmon Survey	·	1.2 km	MPC · JPL
585308	2017 XQ_{73}	—	December 9, 2017	Mount Lemmon	Mount Lemmon Survey	MAR	850 m	MPC · JPL
585309	2017 XT_{73}	—	September 8, 2016	Haleakala	Pan-STARRS 1	VER	2.4 km	MPC · JPL
585310	2017 YZ_{1}	—	December 20, 2017	Mount Lemmon	Mount Lemmon Survey	APO · PHA	300 m	MPC · JPL
585311	2017 YD_{6}	—	July 27, 2011	Haleakala	Pan-STARRS 1	H	570 m	MPC · JPL
585312	2017 YC_{9}	—	November 21, 2017	Mount Lemmon	Mount Lemmon Survey	·	3.5 km	MPC · JPL
585313	2017 YH_{9}	—	October 7, 2004	Kitt Peak	Spacewatch	·	1 km	MPC · JPL
585314	2017 YQ_{9}	—	October 22, 2003	Apache Point	SDSS Collaboration	·	2.0 km	MPC · JPL
585315	2017 YM_{10}	—	June 21, 2007	Mount Lemmon	Mount Lemmon Survey	·	1.2 km	MPC · JPL
585316	2017 YA_{11}	—	March 17, 2015	Haleakala	Pan-STARRS 1	·	1.0 km	MPC · JPL
585317	2017 YE_{11}	—	January 28, 2015	Haleakala	Pan-STARRS 1	·	1.6 km	MPC · JPL
585318	2017 YW_{11}	—	November 16, 2011	Mount Lemmon	Mount Lemmon Survey	·	2.4 km	MPC · JPL
585319	2017 YY_{13}	—	August 14, 2012	Haleakala	Pan-STARRS 1	·	1.7 km	MPC · JPL
585320	2017 YP_{14}	—	October 16, 2006	Catalina	CSS	PHO	770 m	MPC · JPL
585321	2017 YA_{15}	—	October 23, 2011	Catalina	CSS	T_{j} (2.92)	3.8 km	MPC · JPL
585322	2017 YJ_{15}	—	October 31, 2011	Mayhill-ISON	L. Elenin	·	3.3 km	MPC · JPL
585323	2017 YK_{15}	—	October 19, 2003	Palomar	NEAT	·	770 m	MPC · JPL
585324	2017 YW_{16}	—	May 16, 2007	Mount Lemmon	Mount Lemmon Survey	·	1.2 km	MPC · JPL
585325	2017 YC_{23}	—	December 23, 2017	Haleakala	Pan-STARRS 1	KON	1.7 km	MPC · JPL
585326	2017 YQ_{23}	—	March 4, 1997	Kitt Peak	Spacewatch	·	1.8 km	MPC · JPL
585327	2017 YK_{29}	—	December 23, 2017	Haleakala	Pan-STARRS 1	·	1 km	MPC · JPL
585328	2018 AB_{2}	—	November 25, 2013	Haleakala	Pan-STARRS 1	·	3.3 km	MPC · JPL
585329	2018 AN_{5}	—	October 21, 2012	Haleakala	Pan-STARRS 1	·	1.4 km	MPC · JPL
585330	2018 AV_{5}	—	February 20, 2014	Mount Lemmon	Mount Lemmon Survey	·	1.8 km	MPC · JPL
585331	2018 AG_{6}	—	September 27, 2016	Haleakala	Pan-STARRS 1	VER	2.1 km	MPC · JPL
585332	2018 AP_{6}	—	February 10, 2014	Haleakala	Pan-STARRS 1	·	1.8 km	MPC · JPL
585333	2018 AD_{7}	—	September 27, 2016	Haleakala	Pan-STARRS 1	·	2.7 km	MPC · JPL
585334	2018 AU_{8}	—	December 3, 2007	Kitt Peak	Spacewatch	·	660 m	MPC · JPL
585335	2018 AW_{8}	—	January 11, 2003	Kitt Peak	Spacewatch	·	1.2 km	MPC · JPL
585336	2018 AD_{9}	—	September 4, 2016	Mount Lemmon	Mount Lemmon Survey	·	2.0 km	MPC · JPL
585337	2018 AW_{9}	—	August 10, 2015	Haleakala	Pan-STARRS 1	EOS	1.6 km	MPC · JPL
585338	2018 AC_{10}	—	April 29, 2014	Haleakala	Pan-STARRS 1	·	2.6 km	MPC · JPL
585339	2018 AK_{11}	—	November 25, 2011	Haleakala	Pan-STARRS 1	·	2.9 km	MPC · JPL
585340	2018 AL_{11}	—	December 24, 2011	Mount Lemmon	Mount Lemmon Survey	·	3.3 km	MPC · JPL
585341	2018 AH_{14}	—	July 23, 2015	Haleakala	Pan-STARRS 1	VER	2.8 km	MPC · JPL
585342	2018 AR_{14}	—	October 25, 2011	Haleakala	Pan-STARRS 1	EOS	1.4 km	MPC · JPL
585343	2018 AZ_{15}	—	September 5, 2010	Mount Lemmon	Mount Lemmon Survey	VER	3.1 km	MPC · JPL
585344	2018 AW_{18}	—	September 6, 2012	Siding Spring	SSS	·	3.3 km	MPC · JPL
585345	2018 AP_{25}	—	January 15, 2018	Haleakala	Pan-STARRS 1	EOS	1.4 km	MPC · JPL
585346	2018 AN_{30}	—	December 25, 2006	Kitt Peak	Spacewatch	·	2.0 km	MPC · JPL
585347	2018 AP_{39}	—	January 14, 2018	Mount Lemmon	Mount Lemmon Survey	·	3.0 km	MPC · JPL
585348	2018 BS_{2}	—	April 2, 2006	Mount Lemmon	Mount Lemmon Survey	·	1.5 km	MPC · JPL
585349 Eeuwes	2018 BS_{7}	Eeuwes	October 25, 2012	Piszkés-tető	K. Sárneczky, M. Langbroek	·	2.3 km	MPC · JPL
585350	2018 BZ_{7}	—	January 21, 2013	Mount Lemmon	Mount Lemmon Survey	·	1.8 km	MPC · JPL
585351	2018 BE_{8}	—	October 18, 2003	Kitt Peak	Spacewatch	·	1.3 km	MPC · JPL
585352	2018 BL_{8}	—	February 26, 2014	Mount Lemmon	Mount Lemmon Survey	·	1.5 km	MPC · JPL
585353	2018 BM_{8}	—	March 31, 2003	Apache Point	SDSS Collaboration	·	3.0 km	MPC · JPL
585354	2018 BA_{10}	—	October 8, 2016	Haleakala	Pan-STARRS 1	·	2.9 km	MPC · JPL
585355	2018 BR_{10}	—	June 15, 2015	Haleakala	Pan-STARRS 1	·	2.8 km	MPC · JPL
585356	2018 CZ_{3}	—	August 23, 2001	Kitt Peak	Spacewatch	·	1.2 km	MPC · JPL
585357	2018 CG_{4}	—	January 4, 2001	Haleakala	NEAT	·	3.8 km	MPC · JPL
585358	2018 CM_{4}	—	January 27, 2007	Mount Lemmon	Mount Lemmon Survey	·	2.8 km	MPC · JPL
585359	2018 CR_{4}	—	March 17, 2004	Kitt Peak	Spacewatch	NYS	620 m	MPC · JPL
585360	2018 CJ_{5}	—	February 1, 2005	Kitt Peak	Spacewatch	·	1.5 km	MPC · JPL
585361	2018 CY_{5}	—	February 7, 2007	Mount Lemmon	Mount Lemmon Survey	TIR	3.0 km	MPC · JPL
585362	2018 CU_{6}	—	November 22, 2006	Mount Lemmon	Mount Lemmon Survey	·	3.2 km	MPC · JPL
585363	2018 CE_{8}	—	December 11, 2012	Catalina	CSS	·	2.1 km	MPC · JPL
585364	2018 CO_{8}	—	February 13, 2008	Catalina	CSS	·	540 m	MPC · JPL
585365	2018 CB_{9}	—	December 25, 2011	Mount Lemmon	Mount Lemmon Survey	THB	2.7 km	MPC · JPL
585366	2018 CM_{9}	—	February 12, 2004	Kitt Peak	Spacewatch	·	1.7 km	MPC · JPL
585367	2018 CB_{10}	—	February 11, 2004	Palomar	NEAT	·	2.3 km	MPC · JPL
585368	2018 CN_{11}	—	November 11, 2009	Mount Lemmon	Mount Lemmon Survey	NYS	980 m	MPC · JPL
585369	2018 CR_{11}	—	October 21, 2016	Mount Lemmon	Mount Lemmon Survey	·	1.6 km	MPC · JPL
585370	2018 CP_{12}	—	February 6, 2013	Kitt Peak	Spacewatch	·	2.4 km	MPC · JPL
585371	2018 CA_{13}	—	August 16, 2009	Kitt Peak	Spacewatch	·	3.6 km	MPC · JPL
585372	2018 CG_{13}	—	June 26, 2014	Haleakala	Pan-STARRS 1	·	420 m	MPC · JPL
585373	2018 DR_{2}	—	January 25, 2012	Haleakala	Pan-STARRS 1	·	2.6 km	MPC · JPL
585374	2018 DG_{3}	—	March 12, 2014	Haleakala	Pan-STARRS 1	·	1.7 km	MPC · JPL
585375	2018 DR_{6}	—	February 17, 2018	Mount Lemmon	Mount Lemmon Survey	·	2.5 km	MPC · JPL
585376	2018 EM_{1}	—	March 15, 2013	Palomar	Palomar Transient Factory	H	470 m	MPC · JPL
585377	2018 EP_{2}	—	May 10, 2003	Kitt Peak	Spacewatch	H	480 m	MPC · JPL
585378	2018 EE_{5}	—	April 4, 2011	Kitt Peak	Spacewatch	·	1.1 km	MPC · JPL
585379	2018 EN_{6}	—	April 13, 2005	Catalina	CSS	·	820 m	MPC · JPL
585380	2018 EM_{9}	—	December 25, 2013	Mount Lemmon	Mount Lemmon Survey	·	890 m	MPC · JPL
585381	2018 FF_{9}	—	August 10, 2012	Kitt Peak	Spacewatch	L5	9.4 km	MPC · JPL
585382	2018 FX_{11}	—	October 25, 2005	Kitt Peak	Spacewatch	·	1.1 km	MPC · JPL
585383	2018 FR_{13}	—	March 17, 2015	Haleakala	Pan-STARRS 1	·	620 m	MPC · JPL
585384	2018 FD_{20}	—	May 9, 2014	Kitt Peak	Spacewatch	·	1.4 km	MPC · JPL
585385	2018 FW_{20}	—	September 28, 2008	Mount Lemmon	Mount Lemmon Survey	·	900 m	MPC · JPL
585386	2018 FS_{21}	—	September 23, 2011	Haleakala	Pan-STARRS 1	·	1.6 km	MPC · JPL
585387	2018 FW_{22}	—	April 23, 2015	Haleakala	Pan-STARRS 2	·	540 m	MPC · JPL
585388	2018 FT_{24}	—	October 20, 2011	Mount Lemmon	Mount Lemmon Survey	·	1.5 km	MPC · JPL
585389	2018 FX_{24}	—	April 13, 2013	Haleakala	Pan-STARRS 1	·	2.0 km	MPC · JPL
585390	2018 FG_{28}	—	March 10, 2007	Mount Lemmon	Mount Lemmon Survey	NYS	940 m	MPC · JPL
585391	2018 FN_{29}	—	May 8, 2013	Haleakala	Pan-STARRS 1	EOS	1.9 km	MPC · JPL
585392	2018 FF_{34}	—	March 17, 2018	Haleakala	Pan-STARRS 1	L5	6.0 km	MPC · JPL
585393	2018 GW_{2}	—	December 15, 2001	Socorro	LINEAR	H	510 m	MPC · JPL
585394	2018 GB_{3}	—	August 19, 2016	Haleakala	Pan-STARRS 1	H	370 m	MPC · JPL
585395	2018 GL_{3}	—	April 30, 2013	Palomar	Palomar Transient Factory	H	420 m	MPC · JPL
585396	2018 GL_{6}	—	February 27, 2014	Mount Lemmon	Mount Lemmon Survey	·	1.1 km	MPC · JPL
585397	2018 GN_{6}	—	September 21, 2011	Kitt Peak	Spacewatch	·	1.7 km	MPC · JPL
585398	2018 GV_{6}	—	December 23, 2016	Haleakala	Pan-STARRS 1	·	3.5 km	MPC · JPL
585399	2018 GD_{7}	—	February 23, 2012	Mount Lemmon	Mount Lemmon Survey	·	2.2 km	MPC · JPL
585400	2018 GW_{8}	—	March 13, 2012	Mount Lemmon	Mount Lemmon Survey	THB	2.3 km	MPC · JPL

== 585401–585500 ==
back to top

Designation			Discovery			Properties		Ref
Permanent	Provisional	Named after	Date	Site	Discoverer(s)	Category	Diam.	Ref
585401	2018 GD_{9}	—	September 13, 2005	Kitt Peak	Spacewatch	·	960 m	MPC · JPL
585402	2018 GQ_{9}	—	February 11, 2004	Palomar	NEAT	·	650 m	MPC · JPL
585403	2018 GF_{12}	—	April 2, 2009	Kitt Peak	Spacewatch	·	1.7 km	MPC · JPL
585404	2018 GQ_{12}	—	September 15, 2007	Kitt Peak	Spacewatch	·	1 km	MPC · JPL
585405	2018 GX_{18}	—	August 23, 2014	Haleakala	Pan-STARRS 1	·	1.4 km	MPC · JPL
585406	2018 JS	—	August 4, 2016	Haleakala	Pan-STARRS 1	H	380 m	MPC · JPL
585407	2018 JU	—	January 16, 2015	Mount Lemmon	Mount Lemmon Survey	H	500 m	MPC · JPL
585408	2018 JW_{3}	—	June 4, 2013	Haleakala	Pan-STARRS 1	EOS	1.8 km	MPC · JPL
585409	2018 JB_{4}	—	April 13, 2004	Kitt Peak	Spacewatch	·	2.7 km	MPC · JPL
585410	2018 JF_{5}	—	October 28, 2006	Kitt Peak	Spacewatch	·	1.4 km	MPC · JPL
585411	2018 KA	—	April 17, 2013	Haleakala	Pan-STARRS 1	H	390 m	MPC · JPL
585412	2018 KT_{1}	—	May 30, 2013	Mount Lemmon	Mount Lemmon Survey	H	480 m	MPC · JPL
585413	2018 LN_{1}	—	February 21, 2012	Mount Lemmon	Mount Lemmon Survey	·	2.5 km	MPC · JPL
585414	2018 LR_{1}	—	April 5, 2005	Palomar	NEAT	BAR	1.1 km	MPC · JPL
585415	2018 LV_{1}	—	September 27, 2002	Palomar	NEAT	·	3.5 km	MPC · JPL
585416	2018 LA_{3}	—	January 29, 2009	Catalina	CSS	H	620 m	MPC · JPL
585417	2018 LK_{3}	—	January 26, 2012	Haleakala	Pan-STARRS 1	H	470 m	MPC · JPL
585418	2018 LK_{4}	—	February 19, 2012	Catalina	CSS	H	640 m	MPC · JPL
585419	2018 LF_{6}	—	April 15, 2004	Apache Point	SDSS Collaboration	H	500 m	MPC · JPL
585420	2018 LJ_{6}	—	December 23, 2016	Haleakala	Pan-STARRS 1	H	450 m	MPC · JPL
585421	2018 LL_{6}	—	February 12, 2005	La Silla	A. Boattini	·	1.7 km	MPC · JPL
585422	2018 LW_{8}	—	February 18, 2015	Haleakala	Pan-STARRS 1	H	450 m	MPC · JPL
585423	2018 LX_{8}	—	November 9, 2004	Catalina	CSS	·	4.4 km	MPC · JPL
585424	2018 LE_{13}	—	July 30, 2005	Palomar	NEAT	·	560 m	MPC · JPL
585425	2018 LS_{13}	—	March 31, 2014	Mount Lemmon	Mount Lemmon Survey	·	700 m	MPC · JPL
585426	2018 MU_{1}	—	April 30, 2009	Kitt Peak	Spacewatch	·	1.6 km	MPC · JPL
585427	2018 MD_{4}	—	December 6, 2008	Kitt Peak	Spacewatch	·	3.0 km	MPC · JPL
585428	2018 NP_{1}	—	July 9, 2018	Haleakala	Pan-STARRS 1	APO	230 m	MPC · JPL
585429	2018 NN_{2}	—	June 13, 2010	Mount Lemmon	Mount Lemmon Survey	·	1.2 km	MPC · JPL
585430	2018 NQ_{5}	—	April 23, 2015	Haleakala	Pan-STARRS 1	H	380 m	MPC · JPL
585431	2018 NF_{6}	—	July 3, 2011	Mount Lemmon	Mount Lemmon Survey	·	720 m	MPC · JPL
585432	2018 NJ_{10}	—	November 2, 2010	Mount Lemmon	Mount Lemmon Survey	·	1.6 km	MPC · JPL
585433	2018 NV_{11}	—	November 8, 2008	Kitt Peak	Spacewatch	·	2.7 km	MPC · JPL
585434	2018 NF_{23}	—	July 12, 2018	Haleakala	Pan-STARRS 1	L4	8.3 km	MPC · JPL
585435	2018 NU_{28}	—	July 12, 2018	Haleakala	Pan-STARRS 1	L4	6.4 km	MPC · JPL
585436	2018 PT_{1}	—	April 3, 2011	Haleakala	Pan-STARRS 1	·	510 m	MPC · JPL
585437	2018 PQ_{4}	—	February 15, 2013	Haleakala	Pan-STARRS 1	·	860 m	MPC · JPL
585438	2018 PS_{16}	—	February 5, 2016	Haleakala	Pan-STARRS 1	·	1.8 km	MPC · JPL
585439	2018 PH_{19}	—	September 11, 2007	Kitt Peak	Spacewatch	·	2.3 km	MPC · JPL
585440	2018 PU_{42}	—	June 23, 2017	Haleakala	Pan-STARRS 1	·	1.8 km	MPC · JPL
585441	2018 PG_{56}	—	December 29, 2014	Haleakala	Pan-STARRS 1	·	1.7 km	MPC · JPL
585442	2018 QM_{1}	—	May 27, 2011	Nogales	M. Schwartz, P. R. Holvorcem	·	720 m	MPC · JPL
585443	2018 QW_{5}	—	August 30, 2005	Anderson Mesa	LONEOS	·	630 m	MPC · JPL
585444	2018 QY_{5}	—	April 14, 2007	Mount Lemmon	Mount Lemmon Survey	·	650 m	MPC · JPL
585445	2018 RV_{9}	—	June 21, 2011	Nogales	M. Schwartz, P. R. Holvorcem	·	710 m	MPC · JPL
585446	2018 RN_{13}	—	February 14, 2010	Kitt Peak	Spacewatch	V	660 m	MPC · JPL
585447	2018 RF_{15}	—	September 22, 2008	Mount Lemmon	Mount Lemmon Survey	·	630 m	MPC · JPL
585448	2018 RV_{15}	—	November 26, 2003	Kitt Peak	Spacewatch	·	1.2 km	MPC · JPL
585449	2018 RP_{16}	—	October 1, 2011	Kitt Peak	Spacewatch	·	1.0 km	MPC · JPL
585450	2018 RX_{18}	—	January 19, 2016	Haleakala	Pan-STARRS 1	EUP	3.1 km	MPC · JPL
585451	2018 RG_{19}	—	October 19, 2011	Mount Lemmon	Mount Lemmon Survey	MAS	700 m	MPC · JPL
585452	2018 RS_{24}	—	February 11, 2008	Mount Lemmon	Mount Lemmon Survey	·	1.5 km	MPC · JPL
585453	2018 RM_{25}	—	August 30, 2005	Kitt Peak	Spacewatch	·	570 m	MPC · JPL
585454	2018 RA_{27}	—	December 23, 2012	Haleakala	Pan-STARRS 1	·	650 m	MPC · JPL
585455	2018 RB_{28}	—	September 2, 2008	Kitt Peak	Spacewatch	·	860 m	MPC · JPL
585456	2018 RS_{28}	—	October 4, 1996	Kitt Peak	Spacewatch	EUN	970 m	MPC · JPL
585457	2018 RJ_{30}	—	November 1, 2011	Mount Lemmon	Mount Lemmon Survey	V	610 m	MPC · JPL
585458	2018 RA_{32}	—	September 13, 2007	Mount Lemmon	Mount Lemmon Survey	·	1.1 km	MPC · JPL
585459	2018 RE_{32}	—	November 29, 2005	Kitt Peak	Spacewatch	·	670 m	MPC · JPL
585460	2018 RJ_{33}	—	April 14, 2008	Kitt Peak	Spacewatch	·	570 m	MPC · JPL
585461	2018 RN_{33}	—	February 27, 2006	Kitt Peak	Spacewatch	·	900 m	MPC · JPL
585462	2018 RQ_{33}	—	September 22, 2008	Mount Lemmon	Mount Lemmon Survey	·	1.4 km	MPC · JPL
585463	2018 RZ_{33}	—	October 24, 2011	Kitt Peak	Spacewatch	·	1.1 km	MPC · JPL
585464	2018 RP_{36}	—	October 12, 2005	Kitt Peak	Spacewatch	·	810 m	MPC · JPL
585465	2018 RS_{37}	—	September 23, 2011	Haleakala	Pan-STARRS 1	·	700 m	MPC · JPL
585466	2018 RC_{49}	—	September 12, 2018	Mount Lemmon	Mount Lemmon Survey	·	810 m	MPC · JPL
585467	2018 SL_{4}	—	October 23, 2008	Kitt Peak	Spacewatch	·	630 m	MPC · JPL
585468	2018 ST_{4}	—	January 2, 2014	Catalina	CSS	·	2.4 km	MPC · JPL
585469	2018 SP_{6}	—	January 15, 2010	Mount Lemmon	Mount Lemmon Survey	·	910 m	MPC · JPL
585470	2018 SX_{6}	—	October 10, 2005	Anderson Mesa	LONEOS	H	520 m	MPC · JPL
585471	2018 SZ_{6}	—	September 14, 2013	Haleakala	Pan-STARRS 1	·	2.5 km	MPC · JPL
585472	2018 SB_{7}	—	January 12, 2011	Kitt Peak	Spacewatch	·	2.0 km	MPC · JPL
585473	2018 SL_{7}	—	November 19, 2008	Kitt Peak	Spacewatch	·	810 m	MPC · JPL
585474	2018 SN_{8}	—	July 28, 2014	Haleakala	Pan-STARRS 1	·	1.2 km	MPC · JPL
585475	2018 SB_{12}	—	December 6, 2012	Kitt Peak	Spacewatch	·	600 m	MPC · JPL
585476	2018 SG_{12}	—	January 19, 2013	Kitt Peak	Spacewatch	·	650 m	MPC · JPL
585477	2018 SG_{14}	—	October 28, 2011	Kitt Peak	Spacewatch	·	900 m	MPC · JPL
585478	2018 TH_{1}	—	December 30, 2013	Mount Lemmon	Mount Lemmon Survey	H	560 m	MPC · JPL
585479	2018 TZ_{7}	—	July 19, 2007	Siding Spring	SSS	·	2.9 km	MPC · JPL
585480	2018 TU_{8}	—	November 3, 2007	Kitt Peak	Spacewatch	·	1.1 km	MPC · JPL
585481	2018 TQ_{11}	—	July 29, 2005	Palomar	NEAT	·	540 m	MPC · JPL
585482	2018 TY_{11}	—	January 3, 2009	Kitt Peak	Spacewatch	·	470 m	MPC · JPL
585483	2018 TM_{12}	—	December 2, 2005	Kitt Peak	Spacewatch	·	1.5 km	MPC · JPL
585484	2018 TR_{12}	—	October 2, 2013	Haleakala	Pan-STARRS 1	·	1.3 km	MPC · JPL
585485	2018 TD_{13}	—	April 27, 2006	Cerro Tololo	Deep Ecliptic Survey	·	570 m	MPC · JPL
585486	2018 TR_{13}	—	August 27, 2011	Haleakala	Pan-STARRS 1	·	620 m	MPC · JPL
585487	2018 TS_{13}	—	September 6, 2008	Catalina	CSS	·	660 m	MPC · JPL
585488	2018 TC_{14}	—	September 23, 2011	Kitt Peak	Spacewatch	(2076)	700 m	MPC · JPL
585489	2018 TE_{15}	—	January 1, 2009	Mount Lemmon	Mount Lemmon Survey	·	810 m	MPC · JPL
585490	2018 TT_{20}	—	September 10, 2007	Kitt Peak	Spacewatch	V	610 m	MPC · JPL
585491	2018 UN_{3}	—	September 23, 2005	Catalina	CSS	·	820 m	MPC · JPL
585492	2018 UC_{4}	—	March 6, 2008	Mount Lemmon	Mount Lemmon Survey	·	1.1 km	MPC · JPL
585493	2018 UE_{4}	—	December 9, 2012	Mount Lemmon	Mount Lemmon Survey	·	770 m	MPC · JPL
585494	2018 UL_{4}	—	November 24, 2011	Mount Lemmon	Mount Lemmon Survey	·	1.1 km	MPC · JPL
585495	2018 UK_{5}	—	September 19, 2008	Kitt Peak	Spacewatch	·	760 m	MPC · JPL
585496	2018 UN_{5}	—	July 26, 2008	Siding Spring	SSS	·	960 m	MPC · JPL
585497	2018 UC_{6}	—	October 31, 2010	Mount Lemmon	Mount Lemmon Survey	EUN	1.1 km	MPC · JPL
585498	2018 UE_{7}	—	October 3, 2011	XuYi	PMO NEO Survey Program	V	610 m	MPC · JPL
585499	2018 UT_{7}	—	October 24, 2014	Mount Lemmon	Mount Lemmon Survey	·	1.4 km	MPC · JPL
585500	2018 UB_{8}	—	September 6, 2008	Kitt Peak	Spacewatch	·	730 m	MPC · JPL

== 585501–585600 ==
back to top

Designation			Discovery			Properties		Ref
Permanent	Provisional	Named after	Date	Site	Discoverer(s)	Category	Diam.	Ref
585501	2018 UF_{8}	—	September 6, 2008	Mount Lemmon	Mount Lemmon Survey	·	500 m	MPC · JPL
585502	2018 UW_{8}	—	September 10, 2007	Mount Lemmon	Mount Lemmon Survey	MAS	610 m	MPC · JPL
585503	2018 UM_{9}	—	November 30, 2011	Charleston	R. Holmes	·	770 m	MPC · JPL
585504	2018 UU_{9}	—	December 1, 2008	Kitt Peak	Spacewatch	·	530 m	MPC · JPL
585505	2018 UJ_{10}	—	September 23, 2014	Haleakala	Pan-STARRS 1	V	590 m	MPC · JPL
585506	2018 UW_{10}	—	December 28, 2005	Mount Lemmon	Mount Lemmon Survey	·	580 m	MPC · JPL
585507	2018 UD_{12}	—	September 15, 2007	Anderson Mesa	LONEOS	ERI	1.3 km	MPC · JPL
585508	2018 UM_{14}	—	July 27, 2011	Haleakala	Pan-STARRS 1	·	540 m	MPC · JPL
585509	2018 UV_{15}	—	October 26, 2009	Kitt Peak	Spacewatch	MRX	860 m	MPC · JPL
585510	2018 UB_{17}	—	October 23, 2011	Mount Lemmon	Mount Lemmon Survey	V	480 m	MPC · JPL
585511	2018 UE_{18}	—	April 4, 2010	Kitt Peak	Spacewatch	·	910 m	MPC · JPL
585512	2018 UV_{18}	—	October 12, 2007	Anderson Mesa	LONEOS	·	860 m	MPC · JPL
585513	2018 UY_{18}	—	October 25, 2000	Socorro	LINEAR	·	1.8 km	MPC · JPL
585514	2018 VW_{12}	—	October 20, 2003	Kitt Peak	Spacewatch	·	1.3 km	MPC · JPL
585515	2018 VE_{14}	—	June 9, 2013	Haleakala	Pan-STARRS 1	·	1.5 km	MPC · JPL
585516	2018 VJ_{14}	—	October 5, 2010	La Sagra	OAM	H	430 m	MPC · JPL
585517	2018 VR_{14}	—	October 25, 2005	Catalina	CSS	·	810 m	MPC · JPL
585518	2018 VD_{15}	—	August 23, 2003	Palomar	NEAT	·	1.9 km	MPC · JPL
585519	2018 VT_{15}	—	December 30, 2005	Kitt Peak	Spacewatch	·	1.4 km	MPC · JPL
585520	2018 VR_{17}	—	January 30, 2012	Mount Lemmon	Mount Lemmon Survey	·	1.2 km	MPC · JPL
585521	2018 VJ_{19}	—	January 7, 2014	Mount Lemmon	Mount Lemmon Survey	·	3.4 km	MPC · JPL
585522	2018 VB_{20}	—	November 23, 2014	Haleakala	Pan-STARRS 1	HNS	1.1 km	MPC · JPL
585523	2018 VJ_{20}	—	July 28, 2014	Haleakala	Pan-STARRS 1	PHO	740 m	MPC · JPL
585524	2018 VZ_{22}	—	December 9, 2010	Mount Lemmon	Mount Lemmon Survey	EUN	880 m	MPC · JPL
585525	2018 VV_{23}	—	September 29, 2008	Catalina	CSS	·	670 m	MPC · JPL
585526	2018 VC_{24}	—	September 14, 2013	Haleakala	Pan-STARRS 1	EUP	3.2 km	MPC · JPL
585527	2018 VO_{24}	—	January 6, 2013	Kitt Peak	Spacewatch	·	590 m	MPC · JPL
585528	2018 VA_{26}	—	October 27, 2008	Mount Lemmon	Mount Lemmon Survey	·	710 m	MPC · JPL
585529	2018 VY_{26}	—	March 2, 2011	Kitt Peak	Spacewatch	·	2.0 km	MPC · JPL
585530	2018 VO_{28}	—	September 10, 2013	Haleakala	Pan-STARRS 1	·	1.9 km	MPC · JPL
585531	2018 VZ_{28}	—	October 18, 2011	Kitt Peak	Spacewatch	·	880 m	MPC · JPL
585532	2018 VG_{29}	—	January 6, 2013	Mount Lemmon	Mount Lemmon Survey	·	920 m	MPC · JPL
585533	2018 VZ_{29}	—	February 3, 2008	Mount Lemmon	Mount Lemmon Survey	H	450 m	MPC · JPL
585534	2018 VQ_{31}	—	October 2, 2005	Palomar	NEAT	·	660 m	MPC · JPL
585535	2018 VM_{33}	—	November 19, 2008	Kitt Peak	Spacewatch	EOS	1.7 km	MPC · JPL
585536	2018 VP_{33}	—	February 25, 2006	Mount Lemmon	Mount Lemmon Survey	·	1.8 km	MPC · JPL
585537	2018 VL_{35}	—	September 23, 2011	Haleakala	Pan-STARRS 1	·	690 m	MPC · JPL
585538	2018 VC_{36}	—	August 25, 2014	Haleakala	Pan-STARRS 1	·	1.0 km	MPC · JPL
585539	2018 VA_{38}	—	October 27, 2005	Kitt Peak	Spacewatch	·	1.3 km	MPC · JPL
585540	2018 VO_{39}	—	June 18, 2005	Mount Lemmon	Mount Lemmon Survey	·	500 m	MPC · JPL
585541	2018 VQ_{39}	—	November 27, 2013	Haleakala	Pan-STARRS 1	·	2.0 km	MPC · JPL
585542	2018 VU_{39}	—	September 25, 2009	Kitt Peak	Spacewatch	·	1.4 km	MPC · JPL
585543	2018 VH_{40}	—	November 28, 2013	Mount Lemmon	Mount Lemmon Survey	·	2.4 km	MPC · JPL
585544	2018 VE_{43}	—	November 24, 2006	Kitt Peak	Spacewatch	·	1.1 km	MPC · JPL
585545	2018 VN_{43}	—	November 27, 2013	Haleakala	Pan-STARRS 1	·	2.3 km	MPC · JPL
585546	2018 VU_{45}	—	September 18, 2011	Mount Lemmon	Mount Lemmon Survey	·	470 m	MPC · JPL
585547	2018 VZ_{45}	—	September 27, 2011	Mount Lemmon	Mount Lemmon Survey	·	870 m	MPC · JPL
585548	2018 VE_{46}	—	September 13, 2007	Mount Lemmon	Mount Lemmon Survey	EOS	1.7 km	MPC · JPL
585549	2018 VM_{46}	—	November 1, 2005	Kitt Peak	Spacewatch	·	1.3 km	MPC · JPL
585550	2018 VN_{46}	—	September 26, 2011	Haleakala	Pan-STARRS 1	·	550 m	MPC · JPL
585551	2018 VZ_{47}	—	July 26, 2017	Haleakala	Pan-STARRS 1	TEL	950 m	MPC · JPL
585552	2018 VC_{48}	—	January 28, 2015	Haleakala	Pan-STARRS 1	·	2.2 km	MPC · JPL
585553	2018 VQ_{48}	—	January 28, 2011	Mount Lemmon	Mount Lemmon Survey	·	1.7 km	MPC · JPL
585554	2018 VL_{50}	—	September 14, 2007	Mount Lemmon	Mount Lemmon Survey	·	2.1 km	MPC · JPL
585555	2018 VU_{50}	—	December 16, 1993	Kitt Peak	Spacewatch	·	910 m	MPC · JPL
585556	2018 VY_{53}	—	October 24, 2011	Haleakala	Pan-STARRS 1	V	470 m	MPC · JPL
585557	2018 VJ_{54}	—	September 13, 2007	Mount Lemmon	Mount Lemmon Survey	·	780 m	MPC · JPL
585558	2018 VA_{55}	—	September 16, 2009	Kitt Peak	Spacewatch	·	1.7 km	MPC · JPL
585559	2018 VV_{56}	—	November 17, 2008	Kitt Peak	Spacewatch	·	530 m	MPC · JPL
585560	2018 VL_{58}	—	November 18, 2011	Kitt Peak	Spacewatch	V	480 m	MPC · JPL
585561	2018 VU_{58}	—	September 7, 2008	Mount Lemmon	Mount Lemmon Survey	·	1.5 km	MPC · JPL
585562	2018 VZ_{59}	—	October 25, 2011	Haleakala	Pan-STARRS 1	·	740 m	MPC · JPL
585563	2018 VN_{60}	—	December 20, 2007	Kitt Peak	Spacewatch	·	990 m	MPC · JPL
585564	2018 VV_{60}	—	January 13, 2015	Haleakala	Pan-STARRS 1	·	1.6 km	MPC · JPL
585565	2018 VY_{60}	—	December 21, 2011	Palomar	Palomar Transient Factory	·	1.1 km	MPC · JPL
585566	2018 VC_{61}	—	October 25, 2011	Haleakala	Pan-STARRS 1	·	620 m	MPC · JPL
585567	2018 VH_{61}	—	June 4, 2014	Haleakala	Pan-STARRS 1	·	680 m	MPC · JPL
585568	2018 VS_{61}	—	November 23, 1998	Kitt Peak	Spacewatch	·	930 m	MPC · JPL
585569	2018 VL_{62}	—	January 30, 2012	Kitt Peak	Spacewatch	·	950 m	MPC · JPL
585570	2018 VP_{62}	—	September 1, 2014	Catalina	CSS	·	960 m	MPC · JPL
585571	2018 VZ_{62}	—	January 15, 2009	Kitt Peak	Spacewatch	·	670 m	MPC · JPL
585572	2018 VN_{63}	—	December 8, 2010	Palomar	Palomar Transient Factory	·	1.5 km	MPC · JPL
585573	2018 VF_{64}	—	November 27, 2010	Mount Lemmon	Mount Lemmon Survey	·	950 m	MPC · JPL
585574	2018 VA_{66}	—	November 23, 2011	Kitt Peak	Spacewatch	·	980 m	MPC · JPL
585575	2018 VL_{66}	—	December 25, 2013	Mount Lemmon	Mount Lemmon Survey	·	2.6 km	MPC · JPL
585576	2018 VQ_{66}	—	December 16, 2006	Mount Lemmon	Mount Lemmon Survey	(5)	880 m	MPC · JPL
585577	2018 VT_{66}	—	September 16, 2003	Kitt Peak	Spacewatch	BRA	1.3 km	MPC · JPL
585578	2018 VK_{67}	—	November 2, 2007	Kitt Peak	Spacewatch	·	1.2 km	MPC · JPL
585579	2018 VW_{67}	—	November 22, 2006	Mount Lemmon	Mount Lemmon Survey	·	2.8 km	MPC · JPL
585580	2018 VX_{67}	—	November 28, 2011	Haleakala	Pan-STARRS 1	·	1.2 km	MPC · JPL
585581	2018 VD_{68}	—	May 4, 2017	Haleakala	Pan-STARRS 1	·	1.2 km	MPC · JPL
585582	2018 VU_{70}	—	April 12, 2013	Haleakala	Pan-STARRS 1	·	980 m	MPC · JPL
585583	2018 VP_{71}	—	November 30, 2011	Kitt Peak	Spacewatch	·	700 m	MPC · JPL
585584	2018 VW_{71}	—	November 25, 2005	Catalina	CSS	·	1.6 km	MPC · JPL
585585	2018 VH_{73}	—	December 13, 2006	Mount Lemmon	Mount Lemmon Survey	·	870 m	MPC · JPL
585586	2018 VR_{73}	—	February 16, 2015	Haleakala	Pan-STARRS 1	·	1.3 km	MPC · JPL
585587	2018 VL_{74}	—	May 4, 2005	Mauna Kea	Veillet, C.	V	570 m	MPC · JPL
585588	2018 VC_{75}	—	January 16, 2015	Haleakala	Pan-STARRS 1	·	1.4 km	MPC · JPL
585589	2018 VW_{75}	—	November 21, 2014	Charleston	R. Holmes	·	1.4 km	MPC · JPL
585590	2018 VA_{76}	—	July 9, 2005	Kitt Peak	Spacewatch	·	1.3 km	MPC · JPL
585591	2018 VM_{76}	—	October 6, 2012	Haleakala	Pan-STARRS 1	·	2.0 km	MPC · JPL
585592	2018 VN_{76}	—	September 10, 2007	Kitt Peak	Spacewatch	·	1.5 km	MPC · JPL
585593	2018 VS_{76}	—	October 11, 2010	Mount Lemmon	Mount Lemmon Survey	V	700 m	MPC · JPL
585594	2018 VH_{77}	—	October 31, 2008	Kitt Peak	Spacewatch	·	830 m	MPC · JPL
585595	2018 VO_{77}	—	November 16, 2009	Kitt Peak	Spacewatch	·	1.9 km	MPC · JPL
585596	2018 VV_{77}	—	September 27, 2011	Mount Lemmon	Mount Lemmon Survey	NYS	710 m	MPC · JPL
585597	2018 VA_{78}	—	November 22, 2014	Mount Lemmon	Mount Lemmon Survey	·	1.2 km	MPC · JPL
585598	2018 VO_{78}	—	January 11, 2008	Kitt Peak	Spacewatch	·	780 m	MPC · JPL
585599	2018 VY_{78}	—	December 29, 2008	Mount Lemmon	Mount Lemmon Survey	·	690 m	MPC · JPL
585600	2018 VR_{79}	—	May 7, 2014	Haleakala	Pan-STARRS 1	·	580 m	MPC · JPL

== 585601–585700 ==
back to top

Designation			Discovery			Properties		Ref
Permanent	Provisional	Named after	Date	Site	Discoverer(s)	Category	Diam.	Ref
585601	2018 VO_{80}	—	November 13, 2007	Mount Lemmon	Mount Lemmon Survey	NYS	950 m	MPC · JPL
585602	2018 VA_{82}	—	May 30, 2012	Mount Lemmon	Mount Lemmon Survey	·	1.6 km	MPC · JPL
585603	2018 VG_{82}	—	March 11, 2011	Charleston	R. Holmes	JUN	740 m	MPC · JPL
585604	2018 VM_{82}	—	August 17, 2017	Haleakala	Pan-STARRS 1	·	2.2 km	MPC · JPL
585605	2018 VW_{82}	—	May 21, 2017	Haleakala	Pan-STARRS 1	·	1.7 km	MPC · JPL
585606	2018 VC_{83}	—	October 18, 2014	Mount Lemmon	Mount Lemmon Survey	·	1.5 km	MPC · JPL
585607	2018 VC_{84}	—	January 16, 2009	Mount Lemmon	Mount Lemmon Survey	EOS	2.5 km	MPC · JPL
585608	2018 VD_{84}	—	September 17, 2003	Campo Imperatore	CINEOS	V	670 m	MPC · JPL
585609	2018 VH_{84}	—	December 31, 2002	Socorro	LINEAR	·	1.5 km	MPC · JPL
585610	2018 VM_{84}	—	February 4, 2005	Catalina	CSS	·	1.3 km	MPC · JPL
585611	2018 VD_{86}	—	October 7, 2010	Catalina	CSS	·	1.7 km	MPC · JPL
585612	2018 VS_{86}	—	September 8, 2007	Siding Spring	SSS	PHO	1.0 km	MPC · JPL
585613	2018 VC_{87}	—	December 5, 2005	Mount Lemmon	Mount Lemmon Survey	JUN	900 m	MPC · JPL
585614	2018 VL_{87}	—	October 13, 2010	Mount Lemmon	Mount Lemmon Survey	·	1.3 km	MPC · JPL
585615	2018 VA_{88}	—	April 4, 2003	Cerro Tololo	Deep Lens Survey	·	1.3 km	MPC · JPL
585616	2018 VB_{91}	—	November 28, 2014	Mount Lemmon	Mount Lemmon Survey	AGN	980 m	MPC · JPL
585617	2018 VM_{91}	—	November 2, 2007	Kitt Peak	Spacewatch	·	2.1 km	MPC · JPL
585618	2018 VD_{92}	—	October 26, 2005	Kitt Peak	Spacewatch	·	1.2 km	MPC · JPL
585619	2018 VF_{93}	—	September 29, 2008	Kitt Peak	Spacewatch	·	560 m	MPC · JPL
585620	2018 VO_{93}	—	December 3, 2010	Mount Lemmon	Mount Lemmon Survey	·	1.2 km	MPC · JPL
585621	2018 VN_{95}	—	August 22, 2014	Haleakala	Pan-STARRS 1	·	940 m	MPC · JPL
585622	2018 VK_{96}	—	April 12, 2002	Palomar	NEAT	·	1.6 km	MPC · JPL
585623	2018 VM_{97}	—	November 11, 2009	Mount Lemmon	Mount Lemmon Survey	·	1.5 km	MPC · JPL
585624	2018 VO_{98}	—	October 5, 2013	Haleakala	Pan-STARRS 1	BRA	1.3 km	MPC · JPL
585625	2018 VP_{98}	—	July 7, 2014	Haleakala	Pan-STARRS 1	·	880 m	MPC · JPL
585626	2018 VQ_{99}	—	November 25, 2011	Haleakala	Pan-STARRS 1	ERI	1.0 km	MPC · JPL
585627	2018 VU_{102}	—	October 12, 2007	Mount Lemmon	Mount Lemmon Survey	·	2.0 km	MPC · JPL
585628	2018 VP_{103}	—	December 2, 2005	Mount Lemmon	Mount Lemmon Survey	·	490 m	MPC · JPL
585629	2018 VH_{104}	—	November 25, 2005	Mount Lemmon	Mount Lemmon Survey	·	1.1 km	MPC · JPL
585630	2018 VH_{108}	—	May 7, 2010	Mount Lemmon	Mount Lemmon Survey	·	650 m	MPC · JPL
585631	2018 VJ_{108}	—	January 10, 2007	Mount Lemmon	Mount Lemmon Survey	·	1.2 km	MPC · JPL
585632	2018 VO_{108}	—	September 15, 2007	Mount Lemmon	Mount Lemmon Survey	·	1.5 km	MPC · JPL
585633	2018 VU_{108}	—	November 14, 2013	Mount Lemmon	Mount Lemmon Survey	EOS	1.6 km	MPC · JPL
585634	2018 VP_{109}	—	March 20, 2015	Haleakala	Pan-STARRS 1	EOS	1.4 km	MPC · JPL
585635 Ruxandratoma	2018 VO_{122}	Ruxandratoma	November 6, 2018	La Palma	EURONEAR	·	1.1 km	MPC · JPL
585636	2018 WG_{5}	—	December 31, 2013	Haleakala	Pan-STARRS 1	·	2.5 km	MPC · JPL
585637	2018 XJ_{6}	—	February 2, 2006	Kitt Peak	Spacewatch	H	540 m	MPC · JPL
585638	2018 XN_{7}	—	April 14, 2008	Mount Lemmon	Mount Lemmon Survey	·	1.2 km	MPC · JPL
585639	2018 XS_{7}	—	October 17, 2012	Mount Lemmon	Mount Lemmon Survey	·	2.5 km	MPC · JPL
585640	2018 XQ_{8}	—	November 24, 2008	Mount Lemmon	Mount Lemmon Survey	·	810 m	MPC · JPL
585641	2018 XD_{9}	—	April 8, 2013	Siding Spring	SSS	PHO	1.3 km	MPC · JPL
585642	2018 XA_{10}	—	January 17, 2009	Kitt Peak	Spacewatch	·	540 m	MPC · JPL
585643	2018 XC_{10}	—	October 12, 2007	Mount Lemmon	Mount Lemmon Survey	·	990 m	MPC · JPL
585644	2018 XG_{10}	—	March 28, 2015	Haleakala	Pan-STARRS 1	·	2.5 km	MPC · JPL
585645	2018 XC_{11}	—	November 7, 2007	Kitt Peak	Spacewatch	·	1.8 km	MPC · JPL
585646	2018 XG_{11}	—	November 26, 2014	Haleakala	Pan-STARRS 1	·	1.1 km	MPC · JPL
585647	2018 XJ_{11}	—	October 19, 2012	Mount Lemmon	Mount Lemmon Survey	·	2.9 km	MPC · JPL
585648	2018 XP_{13}	—	January 24, 2011	Mount Lemmon	Mount Lemmon Survey	(5)	960 m	MPC · JPL
585649	2018 XQ_{13}	—	December 13, 2012	Mount Lemmon	Mount Lemmon Survey	·	3.1 km	MPC · JPL
585650	2018 XY_{13}	—	November 1, 2010	Mount Lemmon	Mount Lemmon Survey	·	1.2 km	MPC · JPL
585651	2018 XM_{15}	—	January 28, 2015	Haleakala	Pan-STARRS 1	·	3.1 km	MPC · JPL
585652	2018 XN_{15}	—	December 6, 2000	Kitt Peak	Spacewatch	PHO	960 m	MPC · JPL
585653	2018 XD_{16}	—	October 18, 2007	Kitt Peak	Spacewatch	·	2.4 km	MPC · JPL
585654	2018 XH_{16}	—	November 26, 2006	Kitt Peak	Spacewatch	·	1.1 km	MPC · JPL
585655	2018 XM_{16}	—	December 4, 2007	Catalina	CSS	·	2.7 km	MPC · JPL
585656	2018 XR_{17}	—	February 6, 2011	Catalina	CSS	ADE	2.3 km	MPC · JPL
585657	2018 XJ_{18}	—	December 10, 2014	Haleakala	Pan-STARRS 1	·	1.3 km	MPC · JPL
585658	2018 XW_{19}	—	December 1, 2014	Haleakala	Pan-STARRS 1	EUN	1.0 km	MPC · JPL
585659	2018 XT_{23}	—	October 2, 2010	Mount Lemmon	Mount Lemmon Survey	·	1.3 km	MPC · JPL
585660	2018 XX_{24}	—	December 14, 2018	Haleakala	Pan-STARRS 1	·	2.3 km	MPC · JPL
585661	2018 YP_{1}	—	January 4, 2001	Socorro	LINEAR	·	1.8 km	MPC · JPL
585662	2018 YK_{3}	—	January 20, 2015	Mount Lemmon	Mount Lemmon Survey	·	1.3 km	MPC · JPL
585663	2018 YO_{3}	—	September 14, 2013	Haleakala	Pan-STARRS 1	·	1.6 km	MPC · JPL
585664	2018 YW_{4}	—	August 22, 1995	Kitt Peak	Spacewatch	EOS	2.2 km	MPC · JPL
585665	2018 YT_{5}	—	December 30, 2007	Mount Lemmon	Mount Lemmon Survey	·	2.3 km	MPC · JPL
585666	2018 YK_{9}	—	September 17, 2017	Haleakala	Pan-STARRS 1	·	610 m	MPC · JPL
585667	2019 AR_{1}	—	January 7, 2006	Mount Lemmon	Mount Lemmon Survey	BAR	1.0 km	MPC · JPL
585668	2019 AJ_{4}	—	October 15, 2001	Palomar	NEAT	EUN	1.2 km	MPC · JPL
585669	2019 AT_{5}	—	February 6, 2007	Mount Lemmon	Mount Lemmon Survey	BAR	1.3 km	MPC · JPL
585670	2019 AG_{6}	—	January 10, 2007	Catalina	CSS	·	1.5 km	MPC · JPL
585671	2019 AX_{15}	—	September 9, 2013	Haleakala	Pan-STARRS 1	MAR	910 m	MPC · JPL
585672	2019 AC_{16}	—	November 9, 2009	Mount Lemmon	Mount Lemmon Survey	·	1.1 km	MPC · JPL
585673	2019 AV_{16}	—	January 22, 2004	Socorro	LINEAR	PHO	890 m	MPC · JPL
585674	2019 AH_{17}	—	October 7, 2012	Haleakala	Pan-STARRS 1	·	2.7 km	MPC · JPL
585675	2019 AK_{17}	—	January 28, 2015	Haleakala	Pan-STARRS 1	·	1.9 km	MPC · JPL
585676	2019 AP_{17}	—	April 2, 2006	Kitt Peak	Spacewatch	·	1.9 km	MPC · JPL
585677	2019 AD_{18}	—	January 17, 2015	Haleakala	Pan-STARRS 1	·	1.5 km	MPC · JPL
585678	2019 AW_{18}	—	October 2, 2006	Mount Lemmon	Mount Lemmon Survey	·	3.3 km	MPC · JPL
585679	2019 AZ_{18}	—	March 18, 2015	Haleakala	Pan-STARRS 1	T_{j} (2.95)	4.4 km	MPC · JPL
585680	2019 AQ_{19}	—	November 27, 2014	Haleakala	Pan-STARRS 1	·	1.2 km	MPC · JPL
585681	2019 AG_{20}	—	November 1, 2007	Kitt Peak	Spacewatch	·	2.6 km	MPC · JPL
585682	2019 AP_{20}	—	August 14, 2013	Haleakala	Pan-STARRS 1	·	1.3 km	MPC · JPL
585683	2019 AW_{20}	—	October 29, 2006	Mount Lemmon	Mount Lemmon Survey	·	2.9 km	MPC · JPL
585684	2019 AD_{21}	—	January 18, 2015	Haleakala	Pan-STARRS 1	EUN	990 m	MPC · JPL
585685	2019 AG_{21}	—	April 25, 2015	Haleakala	Pan-STARRS 1	·	1.5 km	MPC · JPL
585686	2019 AB_{22}	—	March 26, 2011	Mount Lemmon	Mount Lemmon Survey	·	2.5 km	MPC · JPL
585687	2019 AY_{23}	—	January 17, 2011	Mount Lemmon	Mount Lemmon Survey	·	2.4 km	MPC · JPL
585688	2019 AP_{24}	—	December 18, 2001	Socorro	LINEAR	TIR	2.5 km	MPC · JPL
585689	2019 AH_{25}	—	October 12, 2007	Mount Lemmon	Mount Lemmon Survey	·	1.7 km	MPC · JPL
585690	2019 AN_{25}	—	October 30, 2008	Mount Lemmon	Mount Lemmon Survey	EOS	2.0 km	MPC · JPL
585691	2019 AA_{26}	—	June 19, 2010	Mount Lemmon	Mount Lemmon Survey	·	3.4 km	MPC · JPL
585692	2019 AB_{26}	—	January 7, 2010	Kitt Peak	Spacewatch	GAL	1.8 km	MPC · JPL
585693	2019 AC_{26}	—	October 30, 2005	Catalina	CSS	·	2.2 km	MPC · JPL
585694	2019 AD_{26}	—	October 7, 2008	Mount Lemmon	Mount Lemmon Survey	·	2.6 km	MPC · JPL
585695	2019 AR_{27}	—	November 12, 2005	Kitt Peak	Spacewatch	·	1.2 km	MPC · JPL
585696	2019 AX_{27}	—	October 21, 2017	Haleakala	Pan-STARRS 1	EUP	3.5 km	MPC · JPL
585697	2019 AY_{27}	—	April 1, 2011	Kitt Peak	Spacewatch	·	1.8 km	MPC · JPL
585698	2019 AB_{28}	—	July 16, 2013	Haleakala	Pan-STARRS 1	·	1.6 km	MPC · JPL
585699	2019 AE_{28}	—	October 17, 2012	Mount Lemmon	Mount Lemmon Survey	·	3.1 km	MPC · JPL
585700	2019 AD_{29}	—	April 17, 2009	Kitt Peak	Spacewatch	·	2.5 km	MPC · JPL

== 585701–585800 ==
back to top

Designation			Discovery			Properties		Ref
Permanent	Provisional	Named after	Date	Site	Discoverer(s)	Category	Diam.	Ref
585701	2019 AX_{30}	—	February 8, 2007	Mount Lemmon	Mount Lemmon Survey	·	1.0 km	MPC · JPL
585702	2019 AL_{31}	—	October 6, 2005	Mount Lemmon	Mount Lemmon Survey	MAR	850 m	MPC · JPL
585703	2019 AL_{32}	—	November 14, 1995	Kitt Peak	Spacewatch	·	1.7 km	MPC · JPL
585704	2019 AT_{32}	—	October 21, 2009	Catalina	CSS	EUN	1.1 km	MPC · JPL
585705	2019 AS_{33}	—	February 4, 2016	Haleakala	Pan-STARRS 1	PHO	730 m	MPC · JPL
585706	2019 AL_{34}	—	March 31, 2015	Haleakala	Pan-STARRS 1	·	2.5 km	MPC · JPL
585707	2019 AW_{34}	—	February 18, 2005	La Silla	A. Boattini	·	1.6 km	MPC · JPL
585708	2019 AP_{35}	—	October 10, 2012	Haleakala	Pan-STARRS 1	·	1.9 km	MPC · JPL
585709	2019 AY_{37}	—	January 17, 2016	Haleakala	Pan-STARRS 1	·	1.5 km	MPC · JPL
585710	2019 AL_{40}	—	August 7, 2016	Haleakala	Pan-STARRS 1	·	2.5 km	MPC · JPL
585711	2019 AS_{40}	—	January 25, 2006	Kitt Peak	Spacewatch	·	1.2 km	MPC · JPL
585712	2019 AX_{40}	—	November 6, 2008	Kitt Peak	Spacewatch	HOF	2.2 km	MPC · JPL
585713	2019 AN_{41}	—	October 28, 2008	Kitt Peak	Spacewatch	·	1.9 km	MPC · JPL
585714	2019 AY_{41}	—	July 29, 2008	Kitt Peak	Spacewatch	·	1.4 km	MPC · JPL
585715	2019 AZ_{41}	—	October 16, 2012	Mount Lemmon	Mount Lemmon Survey	·	1.6 km	MPC · JPL
585716	2019 AF_{42}	—	December 1, 2008	Mount Lemmon	Mount Lemmon Survey	·	1.5 km	MPC · JPL
585717	2019 AG_{42}	—	March 5, 2006	Kitt Peak	Spacewatch	·	1.6 km	MPC · JPL
585718	2019 AK_{42}	—	February 28, 2009	Kitt Peak	Spacewatch	·	2.2 km	MPC · JPL
585719	2019 AM_{42}	—	March 26, 2014	Mount Lemmon	Mount Lemmon Survey	·	2.5 km	MPC · JPL
585720	2019 AD_{43}	—	February 7, 2007	Mount Lemmon	Mount Lemmon Survey	MAR	1.0 km	MPC · JPL
585721	2019 AO_{43}	—	December 25, 2005	Kitt Peak	Spacewatch	·	1.3 km	MPC · JPL
585722	2019 AQ_{43}	—	January 6, 2010	Kitt Peak	Spacewatch	·	2.0 km	MPC · JPL
585723	2019 AS_{43}	—	September 28, 2017	XuYi	PMO NEO Survey Program	·	1.8 km	MPC · JPL
585724	2019 AU_{43}	—	December 13, 2006	Kitt Peak	Spacewatch	·	900 m	MPC · JPL
585725	2019 AY_{43}	—	February 4, 2006	Kitt Peak	Spacewatch	·	610 m	MPC · JPL
585726	2019 AD_{44}	—	January 25, 2015	Haleakala	Pan-STARRS 1	·	1.5 km	MPC · JPL
585727	2019 AD_{46}	—	September 5, 2008	Kitt Peak	Spacewatch	·	1.5 km	MPC · JPL
585728	2019 AY_{47}	—	April 20, 2009	Kitt Peak	Spacewatch	·	2.4 km	MPC · JPL
585729	2019 AD_{50}	—	January 1, 2009	Kitt Peak	Spacewatch	·	1.9 km	MPC · JPL
585730	2019 AM_{50}	—	April 6, 2011	Mount Lemmon	Mount Lemmon Survey	·	1.7 km	MPC · JPL
585731	2019 AU_{52}	—	January 1, 2008	Kitt Peak	Spacewatch	·	2.3 km	MPC · JPL
585732	2019 AG_{53}	—	December 31, 2013	Mount Lemmon	Mount Lemmon Survey	HOF	2.0 km	MPC · JPL
585733	2019 AS_{61}	—	January 14, 2019	Haleakala	Pan-STARRS 1	·	1.5 km	MPC · JPL
585734	2019 BA_{1}	—	January 16, 2019	Haleakala	Pan-STARRS 1	APO	130 m	MPC · JPL
585735	2019 BN_{5}	—	December 3, 1996	Kitt Peak	Spacewatch	MAR	1.1 km	MPC · JPL
585736	2019 BR_{5}	—	November 30, 2004	Palomar	NEAT	·	2.7 km	MPC · JPL
585737	2019 BZ_{5}	—	November 6, 2013	Haleakala	Pan-STARRS 1	·	2.1 km	MPC · JPL
585738	2019 BC_{6}	—	January 15, 2015	Haleakala	Pan-STARRS 1	HNS	960 m	MPC · JPL
585739	2019 BG_{6}	—	May 6, 2011	Mount Lemmon	Mount Lemmon Survey	HNS	1.0 km	MPC · JPL
585740	2019 BN_{6}	—	November 22, 2012	Kitt Peak	Spacewatch	EOS	2.1 km	MPC · JPL
585741	2019 BP_{6}	—	December 21, 2014	Mount Lemmon	Mount Lemmon Survey	MAR	660 m	MPC · JPL
585742	2019 BQ_{6}	—	October 7, 2008	Mount Lemmon	Mount Lemmon Survey	HOF	2.5 km	MPC · JPL
585743	2019 BR_{6}	—	November 8, 2013	Kitt Peak	Spacewatch	·	2.3 km	MPC · JPL
585744	2019 BW_{6}	—	October 25, 2017	Mount Lemmon	Mount Lemmon Survey	·	3.1 km	MPC · JPL
585745	2019 BZ_{6}	—	October 29, 2005	Mount Lemmon	Mount Lemmon Survey	·	1.3 km	MPC · JPL
585746	2019 BK_{7}	—	February 14, 2009	Kitt Peak	Spacewatch	EOS	1.7 km	MPC · JPL
585747	2019 BL_{7}	—	January 14, 2008	Kanab	Sheridan, E.	·	2.2 km	MPC · JPL
585748	2019 BW_{7}	—	January 31, 2009	Kitt Peak	Spacewatch	·	1.7 km	MPC · JPL
585749	2019 BG_{8}	—	February 5, 2011	Mount Lemmon	Mount Lemmon Survey	·	1.5 km	MPC · JPL
585750	2019 BP_{8}	—	January 19, 2008	Mount Lemmon	Mount Lemmon Survey	·	1.7 km	MPC · JPL
585751	2019 CE_{6}	—	January 22, 2006	Mount Lemmon	Mount Lemmon Survey	·	1.7 km	MPC · JPL
585752	2019 CF_{6}	—	December 5, 2007	Kitt Peak	Spacewatch	V	650 m	MPC · JPL
585753	2019 CO_{6}	—	September 15, 2013	Haleakala	Pan-STARRS 1	JUN	870 m	MPC · JPL
585754	2019 CQ_{6}	—	October 26, 2000	Kitt Peak	Spacewatch	·	1.8 km	MPC · JPL
585755	2019 CS_{6}	—	December 2, 2010	Mount Lemmon	Mount Lemmon Survey	V	620 m	MPC · JPL
585756	2019 CG_{7}	—	April 11, 2002	Palomar	NEAT	·	3.6 km	MPC · JPL
585757	2019 CK_{7}	—	February 4, 2009	Mount Lemmon	Mount Lemmon Survey	·	610 m	MPC · JPL
585758	2019 CF_{8}	—	October 15, 2007	Kitt Peak	Spacewatch	·	580 m	MPC · JPL
585759	2019 CL_{8}	—	April 7, 2014	Mount Lemmon	Mount Lemmon Survey	T_{j} (2.99)	3.4 km	MPC · JPL
585760	2019 CT_{9}	—	November 19, 2012	Kitt Peak	Spacewatch	·	1.9 km	MPC · JPL
585761	2019 CF_{10}	—	October 23, 2011	Mount Lemmon	Mount Lemmon Survey	·	3.1 km	MPC · JPL
585762	2019 CP_{10}	—	October 31, 2008	Mount Lemmon	Mount Lemmon Survey	·	2.1 km	MPC · JPL
585763	2019 CR_{10}	—	September 15, 2004	Kitt Peak	Spacewatch	THM	2.5 km	MPC · JPL
585764	2019 CT_{10}	—	October 30, 2011	Mount Lemmon	Mount Lemmon Survey	EOS	1.9 km	MPC · JPL
585765	2019 CL_{13}	—	May 8, 2010	WISE	WISE	L5	7.8 km	MPC · JPL
585766	2019 CN_{14}	—	February 5, 2019	Haleakala	Pan-STARRS 1	·	2.3 km	MPC · JPL
585767	2019 ED_{3}	—	January 12, 2018	Haleakala	Pan-STARRS 1	·	2.7 km	MPC · JPL
585768	2019 FJ_{3}	—	September 19, 1995	Kitt Peak	Spacewatch	EOS	2.5 km	MPC · JPL
585769	2019 FT_{3}	—	September 23, 2008	Kitt Peak	Spacewatch	·	1.4 km	MPC · JPL
585770	2019 FT_{6}	—	March 28, 2009	Kitt Peak	Spacewatch	·	1.8 km	MPC · JPL
585771	2019 FX_{8}	—	February 27, 2008	Kitt Peak	Spacewatch	·	2.1 km	MPC · JPL
585772	2019 FC_{18}	—	March 29, 2019	Mount Lemmon	Mount Lemmon Survey	THB	1.8 km	MPC · JPL
585773	2019 GF_{6}	—	January 12, 2016	Haleakala	Pan-STARRS 1	L5	8.1 km	MPC · JPL
585774	2019 GM_{6}	—	February 27, 2008	Kitt Peak	Spacewatch	·	2.4 km	MPC · JPL
585775	2019 GM_{7}	—	May 20, 2014	Haleakala	Pan-STARRS 1	EOS	2.1 km	MPC · JPL
585776	2019 GY_{7}	—	May 14, 2005	Kitt Peak	Spacewatch	·	720 m	MPC · JPL
585777	2019 GJ_{9}	—	April 5, 2008	Mount Lemmon	Mount Lemmon Survey	·	2.8 km	MPC · JPL
585778	2019 GL_{9}	—	December 31, 2007	Mount Lemmon	Mount Lemmon Survey	·	800 m	MPC · JPL
585779	2019 GL_{10}	—	April 5, 2014	Haleakala	Pan-STARRS 1	·	1.6 km	MPC · JPL
585780	2019 GB_{11}	—	April 1, 2008	Kitt Peak	Spacewatch	critical	760 m	MPC · JPL
585781	2019 GH_{12}	—	March 19, 2009	Kitt Peak	Spacewatch	·	1.7 km	MPC · JPL
585782	2019 GP_{12}	—	November 11, 2001	Apache Point	SDSS Collaboration	EOS	1.6 km	MPC · JPL
585783	2019 GS_{12}	—	April 5, 2014	Haleakala	Pan-STARRS 1	EOS	1.4 km	MPC · JPL
585784	2019 GK_{13}	—	April 29, 2008	Mount Lemmon	Mount Lemmon Survey	L5	6.5 km	MPC · JPL
585785	2019 GR_{14}	—	February 16, 2010	Kitt Peak	Spacewatch	·	1.4 km	MPC · JPL
585786	2019 GF_{23}	—	December 24, 2013	Mount Lemmon	Mount Lemmon Survey	·	1.5 km	MPC · JPL
585787	2019 GQ_{40}	—	October 14, 2010	Mount Lemmon	Mount Lemmon Survey	·	2.7 km	MPC · JPL
585788	2019 GT_{42}	—	January 6, 2010	Kitt Peak	Spacewatch	·	1.1 km	MPC · JPL
585789	2019 GK_{50}	—	April 2, 2019	Haleakala	Pan-STARRS 1	·	1.0 km	MPC · JPL
585790	2019 GD_{65}	—	April 15, 2010	Kitt Peak	Spacewatch	·	1.3 km	MPC · JPL
585791	2019 HA	—	February 10, 2008	Kitt Peak	Spacewatch	·	2.6 km	MPC · JPL
585792	2019 HF	—	February 29, 2008	Kitt Peak	Spacewatch	T_{j} (2.94)	3.3 km	MPC · JPL
585793	2019 HP_{1}	—	April 24, 2012	Haleakala	Pan-STARRS 1	·	560 m	MPC · JPL
585794	2019 HA_{2}	—	February 19, 2007	Mount Lemmon	Mount Lemmon Survey	(5651)	3.1 km	MPC · JPL
585795	2019 HT_{4}	—	September 28, 2011	Mount Lemmon	Mount Lemmon Survey	KOR	1.1 km	MPC · JPL
585796	2019 HP_{7}	—	July 29, 2008	Kitt Peak	Spacewatch	·	1.1 km	MPC · JPL
585797	2019 HE_{9}	—	April 26, 2019	Mount Lemmon	Mount Lemmon Survey	·	1.2 km	MPC · JPL
585798	2019 JS_{9}	—	June 14, 2011	Mount Lemmon	Mount Lemmon Survey	EUN	1.3 km	MPC · JPL
585799	2019 JN_{10}	—	April 26, 2008	Kitt Peak	Spacewatch	·	1.3 km	MPC · JPL
585800	2019 JA_{11}	—	March 6, 2008	Mount Lemmon	Mount Lemmon Survey	·	2.2 km	MPC · JPL

== 585801–585900 ==
back to top

Designation			Discovery			Properties		Ref
Permanent	Provisional	Named after	Date	Site	Discoverer(s)	Category	Diam.	Ref
585801	2019 JH_{11}	—	May 21, 2015	Haleakala	Pan-STARRS 1	·	1.8 km	MPC · JPL
585802	2019 JK_{11}	—	January 16, 2005	Mauna Kea	P. A. Wiegert, D. D. Balam	·	460 m	MPC · JPL
585803	2019 JO_{12}	—	June 24, 2014	Mount Lemmon	Mount Lemmon Survey	·	2.4 km	MPC · JPL
585804	2019 JM_{18}	—	November 10, 2010	Mount Lemmon	Mount Lemmon Survey	VER	2.2 km	MPC · JPL
585805	2019 JX_{18}	—	November 9, 2007	Kitt Peak	Spacewatch	·	640 m	MPC · JPL
585806	2019 JK_{19}	—	March 19, 2010	Kitt Peak	Spacewatch	·	1.7 km	MPC · JPL
585807	2019 JK_{20}	—	September 17, 2009	Kitt Peak	Spacewatch	NYS	690 m	MPC · JPL
585808	2019 JL_{21}	—	April 20, 2009	Kitt Peak	Spacewatch	·	1.7 km	MPC · JPL
585809	2019 JP_{25}	—	January 23, 2018	Mount Lemmon	Mount Lemmon Survey	·	2.2 km	MPC · JPL
585810	2019 JU_{25}	—	January 12, 2018	Mount Lemmon	Mount Lemmon Survey	·	2.5 km	MPC · JPL
585811	2019 JS_{27}	—	November 28, 2013	Mount Lemmon	Mount Lemmon Survey	·	880 m	MPC · JPL
585812	2019 JK_{28}	—	January 21, 2015	Haleakala	Pan-STARRS 1	·	1.0 km	MPC · JPL
585813	2019 JE_{29}	—	November 11, 2013	Kitt Peak	Spacewatch	·	900 m	MPC · JPL
585814	2019 JY_{29}	—	April 10, 2013	Haleakala	Pan-STARRS 1	·	2.2 km	MPC · JPL
585815	2019 JF_{32}	—	January 19, 2012	Kitt Peak	Spacewatch	·	2.2 km	MPC · JPL
585816	2019 JS_{35}	—	March 1, 2008	Kitt Peak	Spacewatch	·	1.3 km	MPC · JPL
585817	2019 JJ_{39}	—	October 13, 2016	Mount Lemmon	Mount Lemmon Survey	·	2.5 km	MPC · JPL
585818	2019 JB_{43}	—	April 4, 2008	Kitt Peak	Spacewatch	V	590 m	MPC · JPL
585819	2019 JE_{43}	—	May 25, 2003	Kitt Peak	Spacewatch	EOS	1.9 km	MPC · JPL
585820	2019 JA_{45}	—	June 17, 2010	Mount Lemmon	Mount Lemmon Survey	·	1.6 km	MPC · JPL
585821	2019 JC_{45}	—	July 19, 2015	Haleakala	Pan-STARRS 1	EOS	1.6 km	MPC · JPL
585822	2019 JH_{45}	—	March 5, 2006	Kitt Peak	Spacewatch	EUN	1.1 km	MPC · JPL
585823	2019 JN_{45}	—	December 1, 2014	Haleakala	Pan-STARRS 1	PHO	750 m	MPC · JPL
585824	2019 JV_{45}	—	October 5, 2015	Haleakala	Pan-STARRS 1	·	2.1 km	MPC · JPL
585825	2019 JJ_{46}	—	October 9, 2007	Mount Lemmon	Mount Lemmon Survey	·	1.5 km	MPC · JPL
585826	2019 JT_{46}	—	August 10, 2007	Kitt Peak	Spacewatch	·	1.1 km	MPC · JPL
585827	2019 JQ_{49}	—	May 8, 2019	Haleakala	Pan-STARRS 1	·	1.5 km	MPC · JPL
585828	2019 JE_{50}	—	August 30, 2002	Kitt Peak	Spacewatch	·	1.4 km	MPC · JPL
585829	2019 JJ_{53}	—	January 31, 2006	Kitt Peak	Spacewatch	·	3.9 km	MPC · JPL
585830	2019 JW_{53}	—	May 4, 2010	WISE	WISE	·	1.1 km	MPC · JPL
585831	2019 JC_{55}	—	April 12, 2015	Haleakala	Pan-STARRS 1	·	880 m	MPC · JPL
585832	2019 JB_{56}	—	July 19, 2015	Haleakala	Pan-STARRS 1	·	1.6 km	MPC · JPL
585833	2019 JN_{56}	—	October 27, 2006	Mount Lemmon	Mount Lemmon Survey	KOR	1.3 km	MPC · JPL
585834	2019 JX_{58}	—	October 16, 2015	Kitt Peak	Spacewatch	·	2.0 km	MPC · JPL
585835	2019 JX_{61}	—	May 2, 2019	Haleakala	Pan-STARRS 1	·	2.5 km	MPC · JPL
585836	2019 JN_{62}	—	May 3, 2019	Mount Lemmon	Mount Lemmon Survey	·	1.6 km	MPC · JPL
585837	2019 JQ_{62}	—	May 8, 2019	Haleakala	Pan-STARRS 1	·	2.1 km	MPC · JPL
585838	2019 JU_{62}	—	May 9, 2019	Mount Lemmon	Mount Lemmon Survey	H	410 m	MPC · JPL
585839	2019 JZ_{63}	—	May 12, 2019	Haleakala	Pan-STARRS 1	·	2.0 km	MPC · JPL
585840	2019 JT_{69}	—	May 7, 2019	Haleakala	Pan-STARRS 1	EOS	1.5 km	MPC · JPL
585841	2019 KU_{2}	—	May 4, 2002	Socorro	LINEAR	BAR	930 m	MPC · JPL
585842	2019 KR_{3}	—	September 24, 1998	Anderson Mesa	LONEOS	·	1.0 km	MPC · JPL
585843	2019 KB_{5}	—	May 29, 2019	Haleakala	Pan-STARRS 1	L4	7.9 km	MPC · JPL
585844	2019 KD_{6}	—	September 14, 2013	Haleakala	Pan-STARRS 1	L5	7.8 km	MPC · JPL
585845	2019 KK_{6}	—	April 12, 2015	Haleakala	Pan-STARRS 1	L4	8.8 km	MPC · JPL
585846	2019 KO_{6}	—	May 28, 2014	Haleakala	Pan-STARRS 1	·	1.1 km	MPC · JPL
585847	2019 KT_{6}	—	November 19, 2009	Mount Lemmon	Mount Lemmon Survey	L4	9.3 km	MPC · JPL
585848	2019 KT_{19}	—	May 26, 2019	Mount Lemmon	Mount Lemmon Survey	·	1.8 km	MPC · JPL
585849	2019 KK_{22}	—	September 8, 2011	Kitt Peak	Spacewatch	·	1.5 km	MPC · JPL
585850	2019 KS_{24}	—	December 10, 2005	Kitt Peak	Spacewatch	·	3.0 km	MPC · JPL
585851	2019 LM	—	September 22, 2009	Kitt Peak	Spacewatch	L4	6.8 km	MPC · JPL
585852	2019 LA_{3}	—	May 15, 2009	Mount Lemmon	Mount Lemmon Survey	L5	9.9 km	MPC · JPL
585853	2019 LJ_{10}	—	March 13, 2010	Kitt Peak	Spacewatch	·	1.6 km	MPC · JPL
585854	2019 LZ_{14}	—	June 2, 2019	Haleakala	Pan-STARRS 1	·	2.4 km	MPC · JPL
585855	2019 MO_{3}	—	April 24, 2008	Kitt Peak	Spacewatch	L5	10 km	MPC · JPL
585856	2019 MZ_{9}	—	November 23, 2016	Mount Lemmon	Mount Lemmon Survey	·	1.1 km	MPC · JPL
585857	2019 NY	—	May 8, 2019	Haleakala	Pan-STARRS 1	·	1.1 km	MPC · JPL
585858	2019 NR_{53}	—	February 9, 2010	WISE	WISE	·	2.5 km	MPC · JPL
585859	2019 OK_{12}	—	January 8, 2010	Kitt Peak	Spacewatch	·	4.0 km	MPC · JPL
585860	2019 OK_{13}	—	February 8, 1999	Mauna Kea	Veillet, C., Anderson, J.	THM	1.8 km	MPC · JPL
585861	2019 PB	—	September 21, 2003	Kitt Peak	Spacewatch	·	1.6 km	MPC · JPL
585862	2019 PA_{1}	—	October 29, 2010	Mount Lemmon	Mount Lemmon Survey	L4	9.4 km	MPC · JPL
585863	2019 SN_{2}	—	November 30, 2014	Mount Lemmon	Mount Lemmon Survey	H	370 m	MPC · JPL
585864	2019 SX_{7}	—	September 15, 2009	Kitt Peak	Spacewatch	·	540 m	MPC · JPL
585865	2019 SY_{7}	—	May 31, 2013	Kitt Peak	Spacewatch	H	490 m	MPC · JPL
585866	2019 TD_{3}	—	May 28, 2014	Haleakala	Pan-STARRS 1	H	570 m	MPC · JPL
585867	2019 TE_{20}	—	July 25, 2014	Haleakala	Pan-STARRS 1	H	390 m	MPC · JPL
585868	2019 TE_{24}	—	November 1, 2014	Mount Lemmon	Mount Lemmon Survey	·	2.0 km	MPC · JPL
585869	2019 UF	—	August 20, 2006	Kitt Peak	Spacewatch	H	430 m	MPC · JPL
585870	2019 UQ_{20}	—	October 12, 2010	Kitt Peak	Spacewatch	·	1.2 km	MPC · JPL
585871	2019 UY_{116}	—	October 24, 2019	Haleakala	Pan-STARRS 1	EUN	810 m	MPC · JPL
585872	2019 VB_{1}	—	November 29, 2014	Haleakala	Pan-STARRS 1	H	450 m	MPC · JPL
585873	2019 VM_{7}	—	October 23, 2008	Kitt Peak	Spacewatch	·	2.4 km	MPC · JPL
585874	2019 WT_{2}	—	October 25, 2019	Haleakala	Pan-STARRS 1	H	340 m	MPC · JPL
585875	2019 WX_{2}	—	January 28, 2018	Mount Lemmon	Mount Lemmon Survey	H	520 m	MPC · JPL
585876	2020 BT_{38}	—	March 13, 2016	Haleakala	Pan-STARRS 1	HOF	1.9 km	MPC · JPL
585877	2020 BG_{64}	—	January 7, 2006	Kitt Peak	Spacewatch	·	1.8 km	MPC · JPL
585878	2020 BG_{66}	—	February 8, 2013	Haleakala	Pan-STARRS 1	·	3.1 km	MPC · JPL
585879	2020 BC_{78}	—	January 23, 2015	Haleakala	Pan-STARRS 1	EOS	1.4 km	MPC · JPL
585880	2020 DL_{5}	—	February 19, 2020	Palomar	Zwicky Transient Facility	·	870 m	MPC · JPL
585881	2020 GS_{6}	—	May 22, 2015	Haleakala	Pan-STARRS 1	EOS	1.4 km	MPC · JPL
585882	2020 GD_{7}	—	August 27, 2016	Haleakala	Pan-STARRS 1	VER	2.4 km	MPC · JPL
585883	2020 HD_{14}	—	April 30, 2009	Mount Lemmon	Mount Lemmon Survey	·	2.5 km	MPC · JPL
585884	2020 HJ_{15}	—	March 24, 2014	Haleakala	Pan-STARRS 1	·	2.4 km	MPC · JPL
585885	2020 HN_{19}	—	September 27, 2016	Haleakala	Pan-STARRS 1	·	2.7 km	MPC · JPL
585886	2020 HT_{20}	—	January 11, 2008	Kitt Peak	Spacewatch	·	2.5 km	MPC · JPL
585887	2020 HR_{23}	—	March 2, 2009	Mount Lemmon	Mount Lemmon Survey	EOS	1.6 km	MPC · JPL
585888	2020 HD_{24}	—	January 31, 2009	Mount Lemmon	Mount Lemmon Survey	·	1.9 km	MPC · JPL
585889	2020 HZ_{25}	—	July 13, 2013	Haleakala	Pan-STARRS 1	·	810 m	MPC · JPL
585890	2020 HF_{27}	—	October 3, 2006	Mount Lemmon	Mount Lemmon Survey	·	1.7 km	MPC · JPL
585891	2020 HO_{27}	—	September 19, 2011	Haleakala	Pan-STARRS 1	EOS	1.6 km	MPC · JPL
585892	2020 HR_{30}	—	June 30, 2015	Haleakala	Pan-STARRS 1	·	2.5 km	MPC · JPL
585893	2020 HX_{30}	—	April 8, 2014	Mount Lemmon	Mount Lemmon Survey	·	2.3 km	MPC · JPL
585894	2020 HB_{31}	—	August 2, 2016	Haleakala	Pan-STARRS 1	·	2.4 km	MPC · JPL
585895	2020 HQ_{31}	—	October 17, 2017	Mount Lemmon	Mount Lemmon Survey	·	2.7 km	MPC · JPL
585896	2020 HE_{36}	—	April 24, 2014	Mount Lemmon	Mount Lemmon Survey	·	2.2 km	MPC · JPL
585897	2020 HK_{50}	—	September 24, 2011	Mount Lemmon	Mount Lemmon Survey	·	2.5 km	MPC · JPL
585898	2020 HX_{66}	—	October 10, 2012	Mount Lemmon	Mount Lemmon Survey	L5	6.8 km	MPC · JPL
585899	2020 HM_{98}	—	May 21, 2018	Haleakala	Pan-STARRS 1	centaur	40 km	MPC · JPL
585900	2020 JP_{4}	—	January 8, 2011	Mount Lemmon	Mount Lemmon Survey	·	970 m	MPC · JPL

== 585901–586000 ==
back to top

Designation			Discovery			Properties		Ref
Permanent	Provisional	Named after	Date	Site	Discoverer(s)	Category	Diam.	Ref
585901	2020 JH_{6}	—	January 22, 2013	Mount Lemmon	Mount Lemmon Survey	·	2.6 km	MPC · JPL
585902	2020 JB_{7}	—	November 23, 2006	Kitt Peak	Spacewatch	EOS	1.6 km	MPC · JPL
585903	2020 JW_{7}	—	March 3, 2009	Kitt Peak	Spacewatch	·	1.8 km	MPC · JPL
585904	2020 JM_{12}	—	December 14, 2010	Mount Lemmon	Mount Lemmon Survey	SYL	3.7 km	MPC · JPL
585905	2020 JR_{12}	—	April 21, 2014	Mount Lemmon	Mount Lemmon Survey	·	2.7 km	MPC · JPL
585906	2020 JP_{13}	—	October 25, 2011	Haleakala	Pan-STARRS 1	URS	2.5 km	MPC · JPL
585907	2020 KN_{7}	—	October 13, 2010	Mount Lemmon	Mount Lemmon Survey	L4	7.7 km	MPC · JPL
585908	2020 KT_{8}	—	May 15, 2013	Haleakala	Pan-STARRS 1	V	450 m	MPC · JPL
585909	2020 KE_{9}	—	October 29, 2005	Kitt Peak	Spacewatch	ADE	1.9 km	MPC · JPL
585910	2020 KV_{9}	—	February 26, 2014	Haleakala	Pan-STARRS 1	EOS	1.5 km	MPC · JPL
585911	2020 KA_{12}	—	January 16, 2018	Haleakala	Pan-STARRS 1	·	2.8 km	MPC · JPL
585912	2020 QK_{3}	—	August 18, 2020	XuYi	PMO NEO Survey Program	centaur	80 km	MPC · JPL
585913	2020 QQ_{7}	—	August 16, 2020	XuYi	PMO NEO Survey Program	centaur	80 km	MPC · JPL
585914	2020 SE_{25}	—	August 26, 2005	Palomar	NEAT	·	800 m	MPC · JPL
585915	2020 SX_{64}	—	October 29, 2008	Mount Lemmon	Mount Lemmon Survey	L4	7.3 km	MPC · JPL
585916	2020 TD_{72}	—	September 13, 2007	Mount Lemmon	Mount Lemmon Survey	·	1.2 km	MPC · JPL
585917	2020 XN_{11}	—	September 24, 2013	Mount Lemmon	Mount Lemmon Survey	·	440 m	MPC · JPL
585918	2020 YX_{12}	—	February 3, 2009	Kitt Peak	Spacewatch	·	720 m	MPC · JPL
585919	2020 YT_{20}	—	April 29, 2008	Mount Lemmon	Mount Lemmon Survey	·	1.4 km	MPC · JPL
585920	2021 AE_{9}	—	October 1, 2014	Haleakala	Pan-STARRS 1	·	1.7 km	MPC · JPL
585921	2021 CY_{20}	—	March 5, 2008	Mount Lemmon	Mount Lemmon Survey	JUN	810 m	MPC · JPL
585922	2021 FF_{22}	—	September 30, 2010	Mount Lemmon	Mount Lemmon Survey	BRG	1.2 km	MPC · JPL
585923	2021 FJ_{24}	—	March 24, 2012	Kitt Peak	Spacewatch	·	1.5 km	MPC · JPL
585924	2021 FT_{36}	—	April 1, 2012	Haleakala	Pan-STARRS 1	·	1.6 km	MPC · JPL
585925	2021 GC_{20}	—	March 4, 2008	Mount Lemmon	Mount Lemmon Survey	·	1.1 km	MPC · JPL
585926	2021 GQ_{23}	—	September 11, 2005	Kitt Peak	Spacewatch	·	1.2 km	MPC · JPL
585927	2021 GM_{25}	—	September 25, 2005	Kitt Peak	Spacewatch	·	1.2 km	MPC · JPL
585928	2021 GZ_{26}	—	September 4, 2011	Haleakala	Pan-STARRS 1	·	950 m	MPC · JPL
585929	2021 GT_{31}	—	May 28, 2008	Mount Lemmon	Mount Lemmon Survey	·	440 m	MPC · JPL
585930	2021 GZ_{34}	—	February 18, 2015	Haleakala	Pan-STARRS 1	·	2.3 km	MPC · JPL
585931	2021 GB_{39}	—	January 13, 2016	Haleakala	Pan-STARRS 1	·	1.1 km	MPC · JPL
585932	2021 GV_{43}	—	October 24, 2011	Haleakala	Pan-STARRS 1	NYS	820 m	MPC · JPL
585933	2021 GW_{43}	—	February 4, 2006	Kitt Peak	Spacewatch	·	750 m	MPC · JPL
585934	2021 GD_{44}	—	October 17, 2012	Haleakala	Pan-STARRS 1	·	1.3 km	MPC · JPL
585935	2021 GE_{45}	—	September 13, 2017	Haleakala	Pan-STARRS 1	EOS	1.2 km	MPC · JPL
585936	2021 GJ_{47}	—	March 15, 2008	Mount Lemmon	Mount Lemmon Survey	·	1.1 km	MPC · JPL
585937	2021 GC_{51}	—	September 24, 2008	Mount Lemmon	Mount Lemmon Survey	·	1.5 km	MPC · JPL
585938	2021 GS_{51}	—	January 17, 2015	Haleakala	Pan-STARRS 1	·	2.1 km	MPC · JPL
585939	2021 GZ_{51}	—	April 4, 2014	Mount Lemmon	Mount Lemmon Survey	V	400 m	MPC · JPL
585940	2021 GU_{52}	—	January 31, 2016	Haleakala	Pan-STARRS 1	·	1.2 km	MPC · JPL
585941	2021 GP_{54}	—	September 26, 2008	Kitt Peak	Spacewatch	·	520 m	MPC · JPL
585942	2021 GG_{55}	—	April 15, 2012	Haleakala	Pan-STARRS 1	JUN	1.0 km	MPC · JPL
585943	2021 GY_{55}	—	December 10, 2012	Mount Lemmon	Mount Lemmon Survey	·	740 m	MPC · JPL
585944	2021 GT_{66}	—	November 19, 2008	Kitt Peak	Spacewatch	EOS	1.6 km	MPC · JPL
585945	2021 GE_{69}	—	November 9, 2018	Mount Lemmon	Mount Lemmon Survey	·	1.7 km	MPC · JPL
585946	2021 GU_{69}	—	November 1, 2010	Mount Lemmon	Mount Lemmon Survey	·	1.1 km	MPC · JPL
585947	2021 GB_{71}	—	May 26, 2010	WISE	WISE	·	1.8 km	MPC · JPL
585948	2021 GM_{72}	—	October 27, 2008	Kitt Peak	Spacewatch	·	1.6 km	MPC · JPL
585949	2021 GB_{73}	—	January 3, 2014	Kitt Peak	Spacewatch	·	2.4 km	MPC · JPL
585950	2021 GL_{73}	—	March 18, 2010	Mount Lemmon	Mount Lemmon Survey	·	1.6 km	MPC · JPL
585951	2021 GA_{75}	—	December 4, 2012	Mount Lemmon	Mount Lemmon Survey	·	2.9 km	MPC · JPL
585952	2021 GM_{75}	—	September 10, 2015	Haleakala	Pan-STARRS 1	·	420 m	MPC · JPL
585953	2021 GG_{78}	—	October 15, 2012	Haleakala	Pan-STARRS 1	·	1.6 km	MPC · JPL
585954	2021 GL_{80}	—	September 11, 2007	Mount Lemmon	Mount Lemmon Survey	MAS	490 m	MPC · JPL
585955	2021 GY_{80}	—	September 1, 2005	Kitt Peak	Spacewatch	·	1.0 km	MPC · JPL
585956	2021 GG_{85}	—	October 21, 2012	Haleakala	Pan-STARRS 1	·	1.8 km	MPC · JPL
585957	2021 GL_{85}	—	February 28, 2014	Haleakala	Pan-STARRS 1	·	2.6 km	MPC · JPL
585958	2021 GY_{85}	—	April 15, 2021	Mount Lemmon	Mount Lemmon Survey	BAR	640 m	MPC · JPL
585959	2021 GZ_{85}	—	May 14, 2005	Kitt Peak	Spacewatch	·	2.8 km	MPC · JPL
585960	2021 HF_{6}	—	September 20, 2006	Catalina	CSS	·	1.3 km	MPC · JPL
585961	2021 HO_{7}	—	January 16, 2015	Haleakala	Pan-STARRS 1	AGN	1.0 km	MPC · JPL
585962	2021 HO_{8}	—	January 29, 2011	Mount Lemmon	Mount Lemmon Survey	·	1.1 km	MPC · JPL
585963	2000 AS_{213}	—	January 6, 2000	Kitt Peak	Spacewatch	EOS	1.9 km	MPC · JPL
585964	2000 AF_{223}	—	January 9, 2000	Kitt Peak	Spacewatch	AGN	1.3 km	MPC · JPL
585965	2000 AH_{225}	—	January 12, 2000	Kitt Peak	Spacewatch	L4	7.4 km	MPC · JPL
585966	2000 AD_{250}	—	January 5, 2000	Kitt Peak	Spacewatch	·	1.4 km	MPC · JPL
585967	2000 AS_{251}	—	January 5, 2000	Kitt Peak	Spacewatch	·	620 m	MPC · JPL
585968	2000 AK_{258}	—	October 17, 2010	Mount Lemmon	Mount Lemmon Survey	L4	8.0 km	MPC · JPL
585969	2000 AT_{258}	—	November 11, 2010	Kitt Peak	Spacewatch	·	970 m	MPC · JPL
585970	2000 BL_{45}	—	January 28, 2000	Kitt Peak	Spacewatch	AGN	1.1 km	MPC · JPL
585971	2000 BW_{52}	—	March 11, 2005	Mount Lemmon	Mount Lemmon Survey	AGN	970 m	MPC · JPL
585972	2000 BO_{53}	—	January 28, 2000	Kitt Peak	Spacewatch	V	540 m	MPC · JPL
585973	2000 CF_{114}	—	October 24, 2005	Mauna Kea	A. Boattini	HYG	3.1 km	MPC · JPL
585974	2000 CO_{126}	—	February 1, 2000	Kitt Peak	Spacewatch	·	1.9 km	MPC · JPL
585975	2000 CB_{141}	—	February 6, 2000	Kitt Peak	Spacewatch	·	2.2 km	MPC · JPL
585976	2000 CD_{151}	—	December 15, 2006	Kitt Peak	Spacewatch	·	970 m	MPC · JPL
585977	2000 CV_{152}	—	November 23, 2006	Kitt Peak	Spacewatch	NYS	690 m	MPC · JPL
585978	2000 DW_{90}	—	February 27, 2000	Kitt Peak	Spacewatch	·	2.9 km	MPC · JPL
585979	2000 DK_{118}	—	February 26, 2014	Haleakala	Pan-STARRS 1	·	2.0 km	MPC · JPL
585980	2000 EE_{2}	—	March 3, 2000	Socorro	LINEAR	MAS	860 m	MPC · JPL
585981	2000 ES_{177}	—	March 3, 2000	Kitt Peak	Spacewatch	THM	1.8 km	MPC · JPL
585982	2000 EX_{208}	—	May 1, 2000	Kitt Peak	Spacewatch	KOR	1.4 km	MPC · JPL
585983	2000 EE_{209}	—	November 2, 2012	Mount Lemmon	Mount Lemmon Survey	·	1.8 km	MPC · JPL
585984	2000 FP_{52}	—	March 29, 2000	Kitt Peak	Spacewatch	·	2.2 km	MPC · JPL
585985	2000 FG_{74}	—	March 30, 2000	Kitt Peak	Spacewatch	·	780 m	MPC · JPL
585986	2000 GY_{183}	—	January 31, 2009	Kitt Peak	Spacewatch	KOR	1.2 km	MPC · JPL
585987	2000 GH_{189}	—	April 4, 2000	Apache Point	SDSS Collaboration	L4	8.5 km	MPC · JPL
585988	2000 HX	—	April 24, 2000	Kitt Peak	Spacewatch	·	510 m	MPC · JPL
585989	2000 JP_{67}	—	April 26, 2000	Kitt Peak	Spacewatch	·	970 m	MPC · JPL
585990	2000 NV_{6}	—	July 4, 2000	Kitt Peak	Spacewatch	·	600 m	MPC · JPL
585991	2000 OQ_{61}	—	July 29, 2000	Cerro Tololo	Deep Ecliptic Survey	·	1.3 km	MPC · JPL
585992	2000 OE_{70}	—	November 25, 2011	Haleakala	Pan-STARRS 1	·	490 m	MPC · JPL
585993	2000 OQ_{72}	—	October 5, 2013	Mount Lemmon	Mount Lemmon Survey	(5)	880 m	MPC · JPL
585994	2000 QX_{235}	—	August 26, 2000	Cerro Tololo	Deep Ecliptic Survey	·	760 m	MPC · JPL
585995	2000 QD_{245}	—	August 31, 2000	Kitt Peak	Spacewatch	·	2.3 km	MPC · JPL
585996	2000 QM_{247}	—	September 3, 2000	Kitt Peak	Spacewatch	·	710 m	MPC · JPL
585997	2000 QO_{250}	—	August 20, 2000	Anderson Mesa	LONEOS	·	1.3 km	MPC · JPL
585998	2000 QF_{255}	—	January 11, 2008	Kitt Peak	Spacewatch	EOS	1.7 km	MPC · JPL
585999	2000 QZ_{255}	—	August 10, 2007	Kitt Peak	Spacewatch	·	630 m	MPC · JPL
586000	2000 QN_{256}	—	March 10, 2007	Mount Lemmon	Mount Lemmon Survey	·	1.3 km	MPC · JPL

back to top

== Meaning of names ==
As minor planet discoveries are confirmed, they are given a permanent number by the IAU's Minor Planet Center (MPC), and the discoverers can then submit names for them, following the IAU's naming conventions. The list below concerns those minor planets in the specified number-range that have received names, and explains the meanings of those names.

Official naming citations of newly named small Solar System bodies are approved and published in a bulletin by IAU's Working Group for Small Bodies Nomenclature (WGSBN). Before May 2021, citations were published in MPC's Minor Planet Circulars for many decades. Recent citations can also be found on the JPL Small-Body Database (SBDB). Until his death in 2016, German astronomer Lutz D. Schmadel compiled these citations into the Dictionary of Minor Planet Names (DMP) and regularly updated the collection.

Based on Paul Herget's The Names of the Minor Planets, Schmadel also researched the unclear origin of numerous asteroids, most of which had been named prior to World War II. This article incorporates text from this source, which is in the public domain: SBDB New namings may only be added to this list below after official publication as the preannouncement of names is condemned. The WGSBN publishes a comprehensive guideline for the naming rules of non-cometary small Solar System bodies.

Named minor planet	Provisional	This minor planet was named for...	Ref · Catalog
585349 Eeuwes	2018 BS_{7}	Astrid Eeuwes, Dutch amateur astronomer	IAU · 585349
585635 Ruxandratoma	2018 VO_{122}	Ruxandra Toma, researcher of the Astronomical Institute of the Romanian Academy, working on variable stars, galaxies and asteroids.	IAU · 585635
