= (585310) 2017 YZ1 =

Sub-kilometer asteroid on an eccentric orbit

(585310) 2017 YZ_{1}
Discovery
- Discovered by: Mount Lemmon Srvy.
- Discovery site: Mount Lemon Obs.
- Discovery date: 20 December 2017

Designations
- Minor planet category: NEO · PHA · Apollo

Orbital characteristics
- Epoch 1 July 2021 (JD 2459396.5)
- Uncertainty parameter 0
- Observation arc: 8.78 (3,206 days)
- Aphelion: 1.7715 AU
- Perihelion: 0.8830 AU
- Semi-major axis: 1.3272 AU
- Eccentricity: 0.3347
- Orbital period (sidereal): 1.53 yr (558 d)
- Mean anomaly: 43.773°
- Mean motion: 0° 38^{m} 40.551^{s} / day
- Inclination: 20.875°
- Longitude of ascending node: 277.75°
- Argument of perihelion: 298.39°
- Earth MOID: 0.00012 AU (0.047 LD)

Physical characteristics
- Mean diameter: 0.26 km
- Absolute magnitude (H): 20.43

(585310) 2017 YZ_{1} is a sub-kilometer asteroid on an eccentric orbit, classified as a near-Earth object and potentially hazardous asteroid of the Apollo group, approximately 250 meters (800 feet) in diameter. It was first observed on 20 December 2017, by astronomers with the Mount Lemmon Survey at Mount Lemmon Observatory near Tucson, Arizona, in the United States. On 29 January 2018, it passed Earth at 125 lunar distances.

== Orbit and classification ==
2017 YZ_{1} is a member of the Apollo asteroids, which cross the orbit of Earth. Apollos are the largest group of near-Earth objects with nearly 10 thousand known objects.

It orbits the Sun at a distance of 0.88–1.77 AU once every 18 months (558 days; semi-major axis of 1.33 AU). Its orbit has an eccentricity of 0.33 and an inclination of 21° with respect to the ecliptic.

== Risk assessment ==
The 9 January 2018 solution with a 15-day observation arc was listed at Torino scale 1 with a 1:21,000 chance of impacting Earth on 30 June 2047. By 9 January 2018, the geocentric 30 June 2047 uncertainty region had shrunk to ±50 million km. With a longer 20 day observation arc, it dropped to Torino scale 0 and had a 1:670,000 chance of impacting Earth on 30 June 2047. On 18 January 2018 it was removed from the Sentry Risk Table. With a 28-day observation arc, the nominal solution suggests it will be about 0.25 AU (37,000,000 km) from Earth on 30 June 2047. The 3-sigma uncertainty in the 2047 close approach distance is about ±13 million km.

== Numbering and naming ==
This minor planet was numbered by the Minor Planet Center on 10 August 2021, receiving the number 585310 in the minor planet catalog (M.P.C. 133609). As of 2025, it has not been named.

== See also ==
- List of asteroid close approaches to Earth in 2018
