= List of asteroid close approaches to Earth in 2024 =

- Asteroids which came closer to Earth than the Moon in 2024 by time of discovery
- After closest approach: 65 (44.8%)
- < 24 hours before: 18 (12.4%)
- up to 7 days before: 58 (40.0%)
- > one week before: 4 (2.8%)
- > 7 weeks before: 0 (0.0%)
- > one year before: 0 (0.0%)
Other years

- Asteroids which came closer to Earth than the Moon in 2024 by discoverer
- G96 Mt. Lemmon Survey: 48 (33.1%); 703 Catalina Sky Survey: 25 (17.2%); F52 Pan-STARRS 2: 13 (9.0%); L51 MARGO, Nauchyi: 9 (6.2%); T05 ATLAS-MLO, Manua Loa: 9 (6.2%); F51 Pan-STARRS 1: 8 (5.5%); T05 ATLAS-HKO, Haleakala: 7 (4.8%); K88 GINOP-KHK, Piszkesteto: 7 (4.8%); M22 ATLAS South Africa: 6 (4.1%); W68 ATLAS Chile: 5 (3.4%); V00 Kitt Peak-Bok: 3 (2.1%); L87 Moonbase South Obs.: 2 (1.4%); I41 Palomar Mountain--ZTF: 1 (0.7%); W16 Pleasant Groves Obs.: 1 (0.7%); U68 JPL SynTrack RT: 1 (0.7%)

Below is the list of asteroids that have come close to Earth in 2024.

== Timeline of known close approaches less than one lunar distance from Earth ==
A list of the 145 known near-Earth asteroid close approaches less than 1 lunar distance (0.0025696 AU (384,410 km; 238,860 mi)) from Earth in 2024, based on the close approach database of the Center for Near-Earth Object Studies (CNEOS).

For reference, the radius of Earth is about 0.0000426 AU (0.0166 LD; 6,370 km; 3,960 mi). Geosynchronous satellites have an orbit with semi-major axis length of 0.000282 AU (0.110 LD; 42,200 km; 26,200 mi).

The closest approach of Earth by an asteroid in 2024 was that of 2024 XA, an asteroid with a diameter of 1.2–2.8 m (3.9–9.2 ft), at 7,726 km (4,801 mi; 5.165×10^{−5} AU; 0.02010 LD) from the center of the Earth, or 1,350 km (840 mi) above its surface. The largest asteroid to pass within 1 LD of Earth in 2024 was 2024 MK at 100–230 m (330–750 ft) in diameter, for an absolute magnitude of 22.0. The fastest asteroid to pass within 1 LD of Earth in 2024 was 2024 CH_{4} that passed Earth with a velocity with respect to Earth of 24.01 km/s (53,700 mph), while the slowest bypass within lunar distance was that of 2024 VO at a velocity with respect to Earth of 3.08 km/s (6,900 mph).

The CNEOS database of close approaches lists some close approaches a full orbit or more before the discovery of the object, derived by orbit calculation. The list below only includes close approaches that are evidenced by observations, thus the pre-discovery close approaches would only be included if the object was found by precovery, but there was no such close approach in 2024.

This list and relevant databases do not consider impacts as close approaches, thus this list does not include 2024 BX1, 2024 RW1, 2024 UQ and 2024 XA1, asteroids which were predicted to impact on Earth and burned up in its atmosphere, as well as several more objects that collided with Earth's atmosphere in 2024 which weren't discovered in advance, but were observed visually or recorded by infrasound sensors designed to detect detonation of nuclear devices.

Rows highlighted red indicate objects which were not discovered until after closest approach

Rows highlighted yellow indicate objects discovered less than 24 hours before closest approach

Rows highlighted green indicate objects discovered more than one week before closest approach

Rows highlighted turquoise indicate objects discovered more than 7 weeks before closest approach

Rows highlighted blue indicate objects discovered more than one year before closest approach
(i.e. objects successfully cataloged on a previous orbit, rather than being detected during final approach)

| Date of closest approach | Discovery (Note: Discovery date (first reported image), and if the object was confirmed and previously undiscovered, the discoverer) | Object | Nominal geocentric distance (Note: Distance from the center of Earth to the center of the object. See the NASA/JPL Solar System Dynamics Glossary: Geocentric. Earth has an equatorial radius of 6,378 km (3,963 mi; 0.01659 LD).) | Uncertainty region (3-sigma) | Approx. size (m) | (H) (abs. mag.) | Closer approach to Moon (Note: Objects that approached closer to the Moon than Earth are marked with a check.) |
|---|---|---|---|---|---|---|---|
| 2024-01-04 | 2024-01-01; F52 Pan-STARRS 2 | 2024 AD | 242,676 km (150,792 mi; 0.00162219 AU; 0.63131 LD) | ± 169 km (105 mi) | 4.7–11 | 28.8 | ? |
| 2024-01-11 | 2024-01-14; 703 Catalina Sky Survey | 2024 AM_{4} | 119,476 km (74,239 mi; 0.00079865 AU; 0.31081 LD) | ± 149 km (93 mi) | 4.8–11 | 28.7 | ? |
| 2024-01-11 | 2024-01-14; G96 Mt. Lemmon Survey | 2024 AG_{4} | 340,450 km (211,550 mi; 0.0022758 AU; 0.8857 LD) | ± 1,302 km (809 mi) | 5.5–12 | 28.4 | ? |
| 2024-01-14 | 2024-01-12; K88 GINOP-KHK, Piszkesteto | 2024 AZ_{3} | 248,883 km (154,649 mi; 0.00166368 AU; 0.64745 LD) | ± 1,057 km (657 mi) | 4.7–10 | 28.8 | ? |
| 2024-01-15 | 2024-01-16; G96 Mt. Lemmon Survey | 2024 BA_{16} | 140,010 km (87,000 mi; 0.0009359 AU; 0.3642 LD) | ± 700 km (430 mi) | 4.3–9.7 | 28.9 | ? |
| 2024-01-20 | 2024-01-18; V00 Kitt Peak-Bok | 2024 BQ_{1} | 345,215 km (214,507 mi; 0.00230762 AU; 0.89805 LD) | ± 261 km (162 mi) | 2.6–5.8 | 30.1 | ? |
| 2024-01-22 | 2024-01-22; T05 ATLAS-HKO, Haleakala | 2024 BR_{2} | 292,974 km (182,046 mi; 0.00195841 AU; 0.76215 LD) | ± 79 km (49 mi) | 10–23 | 27.1 | ? |
| 2024-01-27 | 2024-01-17; G96 Mt. Lemmon Survey | 2024 BJ | 353,564 km (219,694 mi; 0.00236343 AU; 0.91977 LD) | ± 10 km (6.2 mi) | 15–33 | 26.3 | ? |
| 2024-02-08 | 2024-02-06; K88 GINOP-KHK, Piszkesteto | 2024 CK_{1} | 227,778 km (141,535 mi; 0.00152260 AU; 0.59255 LD) | ± 220 km (140 mi) | 3.6–8.0 | 29.4 | ? |
| 2024-02-09 | 2024-02-06; K88 GINOP-KHK, Piszkesteto | 2024 CJ_{1} | 367,491 km (228,348 mi; 0.00245653 AU; 0.95600 LD) | ± 767 km (477 mi) | 5.5–12 | 28.4 | ? |
| 2024-02-11 | 2024-02-12; U68 JPL SynTrack Robotic Telescope, Auberry | 2024 CH_{4} | 109,045 km (67,757 mi; 0.00072892 AU; 0.28367 LD) | ± 477 km (296 mi) | 7.7–17 | 27.7 | ? |
| 2024-02-12 | 2024-02-09; F52 Pan-STARRS 2 | 2024 CY_{1} | 121,465 km (75,475 mi; 0.00081194 AU; 0.31598 LD) | ± 134 km (83 mi) | 3.8–8.5 | 29.2 | ? |
| 2024-02-12 | 2024-02-12; M22 ATLAS South Africa | 2024 CM_{5} | 140,270 km (87,160 mi; 0.0009376 AU; 0.3649 LD) | ± 164 km (102 mi) | 5.7–13 | 28.3 | ? |
| 2024-02-16 | 2024-02-14; F52 Pan-STARRS 2 | 2024 CT_{6} | 359,648 km (223,475 mi; 0.00240410 AU; 0.93560 LD) | ± 829 km (515 mi) | 3.9–8.6 | 29.2 | ? |
| 2024-02-17 | 2024-02-15; G96 Mt. Lemmon Survey | 2024 CF_{7} | 105,880 km (65,790 mi; 0.0007078 AU; 0.2754 LD) | ± 266 km (165 mi) | 3.4–7.6 | 29.5 | ? |
| 2024-02-18 | 2024-02-19; G96 Mt. Lemmon Survey | 2024 DY | 171,620 km (106,640 mi; 0.0011472 AU; 0.4465 LD) | ± 198 km (123 mi) | 4.2–9.3 | 29.0 | ? |
| 2024-02-22 | 2024-02-19; G96 Mt. Lemmon Survey | 2024 DW | 224,554 km (139,531 mi; 0.00150105 AU; 0.58416 LD) | ± 294 km (183 mi) | 9.9–22 | 27.1 | ? |
| 2024-03-04 | 2024-03-02; G96 Mt. Lemmon Survey | 2024 EF | 57,608 km (35,796 mi; 0.00038509 AU; 0.14986 LD) | ± 31 km (19 mi) | 3.9–8.8 | 29.1 | ? |
| 2024-03-10 | 2024-03-17; F51 Pan-STARRS 1 | 2024 FC_{1} | 334,039 km (207,562 mi; 0.00223291 AU; 0.86898 LD) | ± 413 km (257 mi) | 7.8–17 | 27.7 | ? |
| 2024-03-11 | 2024-03-12; W68 ATLAS Chile | 2024 EL_{3} | 36,170 km (22,470 mi; 0.0002418 AU; 0.0941 LD) | ± 130 km (81 mi) | 4.7–10 | 28.8 | ? |
| 2024-03-13 | 2024-03-13; 703 Catalina Sky Survey | 2024 EJ_{4} | 26,246 km (16,309 mi; 0.00017544 AU; 0.06828 LD) | ± 11 km (6.8 mi) | 3.5–7.9 | 29.4 | ? |
| 2024-03-17 | 2024-03-14; M22 ATLAS South Africa | 2024 ER_{4} | 161,892 km (100,595 mi; 0.00108218 AU; 0.42115 LD) | ± 127 km (79 mi) | 9.0–20 | 27.4 | ? |
| 2024-03-26 | 2024-04-01; W68 ATLAS Chile | 2024 GD | 317,393 km (197,219 mi; 0.00212164 AU; 0.82568 LD) | ± 242 km (150 mi) | 27–61 | 24.9 | ? |
| 2024-03-26 | 2024-03-25; K88 GINOP-KHK, Piszkesteto | 2024 FO_{3} | 136,549 km (84,848 mi; 0.00091277 AU; 0.35522 LD) | ± 172 km (107 mi) | 7.4–17 | 27.8 | ? |
| 2024-03-31 | 2024-03-31; L51 MARGO, Nauchnyi | 2024 FQ_{5} | 32,617 km (20,267 mi; 0.00021803 AU; 0.08485 LD) | ± 48 km (30 mi) | 1.7–3.8 | 31.0 | ? |
| 2024-04-09 | 2024-04-11; G96 Mt. Lemmon Survey | 2024 GW_{4} | 163,316 km (101,480 mi; 0.00109170 AU; 0.42486 LD) | ± 369 km (229 mi) | 4.4–9.7 | 28.9 | ? |
| 2024-04-09 | 2024-04-10; 703 Catalina Sky Survey | 2024 GV_{2} | 107,567 km (66,839 mi; 0.00071904 AU; 0.27983 LD) | ± 85 km (53 mi) | 3.9–8.7 | 29.2 | ? |
| 2024-04-09 | 2024-04-11; G96 Mt. Lemmon Survey | 2024 GY_{4} | 126,262 km (78,456 mi; 0.00084401 AU; 0.32846 LD) | ± 1,290 km (800 mi) | 3.3–7.3 | 29.6 | ? |
| 2024-04-10 | 2024-04-11; 703 Catalina Sky Survey | 2024 GX_{3} | 71,554 km (44,462 mi; 0.00047831 AU; 0.18614 LD) | ± 105 km (65 mi) | 3.0–6.8 | 29.7 | ? |
| 2024-04-11 | 2024-04-09; F52 Pan-STARRS 2 | 2024 GJ_{2} | 18,674 km (11,603 mi; 0.00012483 AU; 0.04858 LD) | ± 1 km (0.62 mi) | 2.2–5.0 | 30.4 | ? |
| 2024-04-14 | 2024-04-18; F52 Pan-STARRS 2 | 2024 HX | 212,744 km (132,193 mi; 0.00142211 AU; 0.55344 LD) | ± 227 km (141 mi) | 8.9–20 | 27.4 | ? |
| 2024-04-15 | 2024-04-14; 703 Catalina Sky Survey | 2024 GZ_{5} | 68,608 km (42,631 mi; 0.00045862 AU; 0.17848 LD) | ± 23 km (14 mi) | 2.3–5.2 | 30.3 | ? |
| 2024-04-16 | 2024-04-16; F52 Pan-STARRS 2 | 2024 HA | 15,555 km (9,665 mi; 0.00010398 AU; 0.04047 LD) | ± 5 km (3.1 mi) | 1.2–2.6 | 31.8 | ? |
| 2024-04-17 | 2024-04-18; 703 Catalina Sky Survey | 2024 HO | 173,237 km (107,644 mi; 0.00115802 AU; 0.45067 LD) | ± 175 km (109 mi) | 4.6–10 | 28.8 | ? |
| 2024-04-19 | 2024-04-18; G96 Mt. Lemmon Survey | 2024 HQ | 319,051 km (198,249 mi; 0.00213272 AU; 0.82999 LD) | ± 1,023 km (636 mi) | 3.5–7.8 | 29.4 | ? |
| 2024-04-26 | 2024-04-26; T05 ATLAS-HKO, Haleakala | 2024 HL_{1} | 163,383 km (101,521 mi; 0.00109215 AU; 0.42503 LD) | ± 117 km (73 mi) | 17–38 | 26.0 | ? |
| 2024-04-26 | 2024-04-28; W68 ATLAS Chile | 2024 HT_{1} | 359,379 km (223,308 mi; 0.00240230 AU; 0.93490 LD) | ± 817 km (508 mi) | 33–74 | 24.5 | ? |
| 2024-04-29 | 2024-04-30; 703 Catalina Sky Survey | 2024 HO_{2} | 37,409 km (23,245 mi; 0.00025006 AU; 0.09732 LD) | ± 93 km (58 mi) | 3.4–7.6 | 29.5 | ? |
| 2024-05-07 | 2024-05-04; G96 Mt. Lemmon Survey | 2024 JR_{1} | 295,533 km (183,636 mi; 0.00197552 AU; 0.76881 LD) | ± 412 km (256 mi) | 7.5–17 | 27.7 | ? |
| 2024-05-08 | 2024-05-01; T05 ATLAS-HKO, Haleakala | 2024 JD | 275,723 km (171,326 mi; 0.00184309 AU; 0.71728 LD) | ± 7 km (4.3 mi) | 8.0–18 | 27.6 | ? |
| 2024-05-08 | 2024-05-07; 703 Catalina Sky Survey | 2024 JL_{3} | 376,533 km (233,967 mi; 0.00251697 AU; 0.97953 LD) | ± 364 km (226 mi) | 14–31 | 26.4 | ? |
| 2024-05-09 | 2024-05-08; G96 Mt. Lemmon Survey | 2024 JT_{3} | 25,753 km (16,002 mi; 0.00017215 AU; 0.06699 LD) | ± 21 km (13 mi) | 4.0–8.9 | 29.1 | ? |
| 2024-05-09 | 2024-05-06; L51 MARGO, Nauchnyi | 2024 JN_{3} | 300,902 km (186,972 mi; 0.00201141 AU; 0.78278 LD) | ± 488 km (303 mi) | 11–24 | 27.0 | ? |
| 2024-05-14 | 2024-05-12; L51 MARGO, Nauchnyi | 2024 JN_{16} | 24,977 km (15,520 mi; 0.00016696 AU; 0.06498 LD) | ± 7 km (4.3 mi) | 3.2–7.2 | 29.6 | ? |
| 2024-05-15 | 2024-05-13; 703 Catalina Sky Survey | 2024 JY_{16} | 336,230 km (208,920 mi; 0.0022476 AU; 0.8747 LD) | ± 251 km (156 mi) | 26–58 | 25.1 | ? |
| 2024-05-31 | 2024-05-28; F51 Pan-STARRS 1 | 2024 KX | 290,759 km (180,669 mi; 0.00194360 AU; 0.75639 LD) | ± 509 km (316 mi) | 7.8–17 | 27.7 | ? |
| 2024-06-01 | 2024-05-30; G96 Mt. Lemmon Survey | 2024 KB_{1} | 364,228 km (226,321 mi; 0.00243471 AU; 0.94752 LD) | ± 496 km (308 mi) | 6.0–13 | 28.3 | ? |
| 2024-06-04 | 2024-05-31; F51 Pan-STARRS 1 | 2024 KA_{2} | 349,184 km (216,973 mi; 0.00233415 AU; 0.90838 LD) | ± 1,045 km (649 mi) | 6.8–15 | 28.0 | ? |
| 2024-06-06 | 2024-06-06; G96 Mt. Lemmon Survey | 2024 LH_{1} | 8,098 km (5,032 mi; 5.413×10^{−5} AU; 0.02107 LD) | ± 3 km (1.9 mi) | 1.8–4.1 | 30.8 | ? |
| 2024-06-16 | 2024-06-14; W16 Pleasant Groves Observatory | 2024 LZ_{4} | 278,738 km (173,200 mi; 0.00186325 AU; 0.72512 LD) | ± 239 km (149 mi) | 16–35 | 26.1 | ? |
| 2024-06-28 | 2024-06-27; T05 ATLAS-HKO, Haleakala | 2024 MW | 92,775 km (57,648 mi; 0.00062016 AU; 0.24135 LD) | ± 26 km (16 mi) | 3.8–8.4 | 29.3 | ? |
| 2024-06-29 | 2024-06-16; M22 ATLAS South Africa | 2024 MK | 295,420 km (183,570 mi; 0.0019748 AU; 0.7685 LD) | ± 1 km (0.62 mi) | 100–230 | 22.0 | ? |
| 2024-07-11 | 2024-07-12; L87 Moonbase South Observatory, Hakos | 2024 NK_{3} | 118,732 km (73,777 mi; 0.00079367 AU; 0.30887 LD) | ± 189 km (117 mi) | 4.8–11 | 28.7 | ? |
| 2024-07-27 | 2024-07-28; L51 MARGO, Nauchnyi | 2024 OG_{2} | 280,294 km (174,167 mi; 0.00187365 AU; 0.72917 LD) | ± 246 km (153 mi) | 4.0–9.0 | 29.1 | ? |
| 2024-07-28 | 2024-08-06; F52 Pan-STARRS 2 | 2024 PF_{2} | 347,965 km (216,215 mi; 0.00232600 AU; 0.90521 LD) | ± 246 km (153 mi) | 18–40 | 25.9 | ? |
| 2024-08-04 | 2024-08-05; I41 Palomar Mountain--ZTF | 2024 PY | 94,351 km (58,627 mi; 0.00063070 AU; 0.24545 LD) | ± 49 km (30 mi) | 3.5–7.7 | 29.4 | ? |
| 2024-08-15 | 2024-08-12; W68 ATLAS Chile | 2024 PZ_{3} | 277,046 km (172,148 mi; 0.00185194 AU; 0.72072 LD) | ± 785 km (488 mi) | 24–54 | 25.2 | ? |
| 2024-08-29 | 2024-08-31; F52 Pan-STARRS 2 | 2024 QH_{2} | 332,738 km (206,754 mi; 0.00222422 AU; 0.86560 LD) | ± 2,188 km (1,360 mi) | 11–25 | 26.9 | ? |
| 2024-09-02 | 2024-09-05; F52 Pan-STARRS 2 | 2024 RR_{8} | 376,871 km (234,177 mi; 0.00251923 AU; 0.98041 LD) | ± 500 km (310 mi) | 5.7–13 | 28.3 | ? |
| 2024-09-02 | 2024-09-01; L51 MARGO, Nauchnyi | 2024 RP_{7} | 316,163 km (196,455 mi; 0.00211342 AU; 0.82248 LD) | ± 1,192 km (741 mi) | 2.3–5.2 | 30.3 | ? |
| 2024-09-04 | 2024-09-05; G96 Mt. Lemmon Survey | 2024 RZ_{2} | 260,516 km (161,877 mi; 0.00174144 AU; 0.67772 LD) | ± 269 km (167 mi) | 5.1–11 | 28.6 | ? |
| 2024-09-04 | 2024-09-05; 703 Catalina Sky Survey | 2024 RL_{3} | 40,844 km (25,379 mi; 0.00027303 AU; 0.10625 LD) | ± 31 km (19 mi) | 4.0–9.0 | 29.1 | ? |
| 2024-09-07 | 2024-09-05; L51 MARGO, Nauchnyi | 2024 RR_{3} | 359,172 km (223,179 mi; 0.00240092 AU; 0.93436 LD) | ± 577 km (359 mi) | 11–24 | 27.0 | ? |
| 2024-09-07 | 2024-09-05; L87 Moonbase South Observatory, Hakos | 2024 RH_{6} | 214,743 km (133,435 mi; 0.00143547 AU; 0.55864 LD) | ± 503 km (313 mi) | 5.1–11 | 28.6 | ? |
| 2024-09-08 | 2024-09-07; G96 Mt. Lemmon Survey | 2024 RH_{7} | 163,001 km (101,284 mi; 0.00108959 AU; 0.42404 LD) | ± 297 km (185 mi) | 2.9–6.4 | 29.8 | ? |
| 2024-09-09 | 2024-09-12; G96 Mt. Lemmon Survey | 2024 RS_{16} | 254,753 km (158,296 mi; 0.00170292 AU; 0.66272 LD) | ± 1,338 km (831 mi) | 3.8–8.6 | 29.2 | ? |
| 2024-09-11 | 2024-09-11; T08 ATLAS-MLO, Mauna Loa | 2024 RX_{13} | 85,724 km (53,266 mi; 0.00057303 AU; 0.22301 LD) | ± 95 km (59 mi) | 1.6–3.6 | 31.1 | ? |
| 2024-09-12 | 2024-09-12; G96 Mt. Lemmon Survey | 2024 RC_{42} | 21,645 km (13,450 mi; 0.00014469 AU; 0.05631 LD) | ± 23 km (14 mi) | 0.89–2.0 | 32.4 | ? |
| 2024-09-21 | 2024-09-22; G96 Mt. Lemmon Survey | 2024 SD | 132,600 km (82,400 mi; 0.000886 AU; 0.345 LD) | ± 219 km (136 mi) | 5.4–12 | 28.4 | ? |
| 2024-09-22 | 2024-09-24; 703 Catalina Sky Survey | 2024 SW | 340,183 km (211,380 mi; 0.00227398 AU; 0.88496 LD) | ± 1,096 km (681 mi) | 7.5–17 | 27.8 | ? |
| 2024-09-23 | 2024-09-24; G96 Mt. Lemmon Survey | 2024 ST | 109,783 km (68,216 mi; 0.00073385 AU; 0.28559 LD) | ± 268 km (167 mi) | 3.1–6.9 | 29.7 | ? |
| 2024-09-26 | 2024-09-28; L51 MARGO, Nauchnyi | 2024 SG_{4} | 305,117 km (189,591 mi; 0.00203958 AU; 0.79374 LD) | ± 2,920 km (1,810 mi) | 8.7–20 | 27.4 | ? |
| 2024-09-26 | 2024-09-25; G96 Mt. Lemmon Survey | 2024 SS_{1} | 268,842 km (167,051 mi; 0.00179710 AU; 0.69938 LD) | ± 377 km (234 mi) | 5.5–12 | 28.4 | ? |
| 2024-09-28 | 2024-09-26; F52 Pan-STARRS 2 | 2024 SV_{2} | 49,262 km (30,610 mi; 0.00032930 AU; 0.12815 LD) | ± 36 km (22 mi) | 4.9–11 | 28.7 | ? |
| 2024-09-29 | 2024-10-01; 703 Catalina Sky Survey | 2024 TA | 371,617 km (230,912 mi; 0.00248411 AU; 0.96674 LD) | ± 209 km (130 mi) | 5.9–13 | 28.3 | ? |
| 2024-09-30 | 2024-10-01; L51 MARGO, Nauchnyi | 2024 TG | 323,964 km (201,302 mi; 0.00216557 AU; 0.84277 LD) | ± 2,197 km (1,365 mi) | 5.2–12 | 28.5 | ? |
| 2024-09-30 | 2024-10-02; T08 ATLAS-MLO, Mauna Loa | 2024 TT | 144,827 km (89,991 mi; 0.00096811 AU; 0.37676 LD) | ± 551 km (342 mi) | 8.1–18 | 27.6 | ? |
| 2024-10-03 | 2024-10-04; M22 ATLAS South Africa | 2024 TU_{3} | 99,898 km (62,074 mi; 0.00066778 AU; 0.25988 LD) | ± 93 km (58 mi) | 6.3–14 | 28.1 | ? |
| 2024-10-04 | 2024-10-05; G96 Mt. Lemmon Survey | 2024 TL_{3} | 197,511 km (122,728 mi; 0.00132028 AU; 0.51381 LD) | ± 1,071 km (665 mi) | 2.3–5.1 | 30.3 | ? |
| 2024-10-04 | 2024-10-05; T05 ATLAS-HKO, Haleakala | 2024 TS_{2} | 191,594 km (119,051 mi; 0.00128073 AU; 0.49842 LD) | ± 176 km (109 mi) | 11–24 | 27.0 | ? |
| 2024-10-04 | 2024-10-01; F52 Pan-STARRS 2 | 2024 TF | 300,096 km (186,471 mi; 0.00200602 AU; 0.78068 LD) | ± 218 km (135 mi) | 3.9–8.6 | 29.2 | ? |
| 2024-10-05 | 2024-10-07; G96 Mt. Lemmon Survey | 2024 TD_{6} | 202,969 km (126,119 mi; 0.00135676 AU; 0.52801 LD) | ± 358 km (222 mi) | 3.3–7.3 | 29.6 | ? |
| 2024-10-05 | 2024-10-04; L51 MARGO, Nauchnyi | 2024 TM_{3} | 54,724 km (34,004 mi; 0.00036581 AU; 0.14236 LD) | ± 59 km (37 mi) | 1.5–3.3 | 31.3 | ? |
| 2024-10-06 | 2024-10-04; G96 Mt. Lemmon Survey | 2024 TL_{2} | 105,670 km (65,660 mi; 0.0007064 AU; 0.2749 LD) | ± 180 km (110 mi) | 1.9–4.2 | 30.8 | ? |
| 2024-10-07 | 2024-10-06; T08 ATLAS-MLO, Mauna Loa | 2024 TR_{4} | 111,788 km (69,462 mi; 0.00074726 AU; 0.29081 LD) | ± 53 km (33 mi) | 11–25 | 26.9 | ? |
| 2024-10-07 | 2024-10-08; G96 Mt. Lemmon Survey | 2024 TQ_{9} | 111,525 km (69,298 mi; 0.00074550 AU; 0.29013 LD) | ± 316 km (196 mi) | 1.9–4.2 | 30.8 | ? |
| 2024-10-07 | 2024-10-08; G96 Mt. Lemmon Survey | 2024 TX_{6} | 102,116 km (63,452 mi; 0.00068260 AU; 0.26565 LD) | ± 113 km (70 mi) | 5.6–13 | 28.4 | ? |
| 2024-10-07 | 2024-10-05; G96 Mt. Lemmon Survey | 2024 TW_{2} | 287,818 km (178,842 mi; 0.00192394 AU; 0.74874 LD) | ± 288 km (179 mi) | 4.9–11 | 28.7 | ? |
| 2024-10-09 | 2024-10-06; F51 Pan-STARRS 1 | 2024 TK_{5} | 226,919 km (141,001 mi; 0.00151686 AU; 0.59032 LD) | ± 371 km (231 mi) | 7.7–17 | 27.7 | ? |
| 2024-10-10 | 2024-10-11; 703 Catalina Sky Survey | 2024 TH_{11} | 29,871 km (18,561 mi; 0.00019968 AU; 0.07771 LD) | ± 49 km (30 mi) | 9.3–21 | 27.3 | ? |
| 2024-10-10 | 2024-10-12; 703 Catalina Sky Survey | 2024 TK_{13} | 171,029 km (106,272 mi; 0.00114326 AU; 0.44492 LD) | ± 211 km (131 mi) | 4.9–11 | 28.7 | ? |
| 2024-10-14 | 2024-10-11; G96 Mt. Lemmon Survey | 2024 TA_{12} | 308,794 km (191,876 mi; 0.00206416 AU; 0.80331 LD) | ± 712 km (442 mi) | 3.4–7.6 | 29.5 | ? |
| 2024-10-15 | 2024-10-08; F51 Pan-STARRS 1 | 2024 TM_{20} | 120,590 km (74,930 mi; 0.0008061 AU; 0.3137 LD) | ± 99 km (62 mi) | 10–23 | 27.1 | ? |
| 2024-10-15 | 2024-10-14; G96 Mt. Lemmon Survey | 2024 TK_{22} | 142,336 km (88,443 mi; 0.00095146 AU; 0.37028 LD) | ± 204 km (127 mi) | 2.7–6.1 | 29.9 | ? |
| 2024-10-18 | 2024-10-22; F52 Pan-STARRS 2 | 2024 UB_{1} | 372,615 km (231,532 mi; 0.00249078 AU; 0.96933 LD) | ± 946 km (588 mi) | 5.4–12 | 28.5 | ? |
| 2024-10-19 | 2024-10-20; 703 Catalina Sky Survey | 2024 UF | 328,530 km (204,140 mi; 0.0021961 AU; 0.8546 LD) | ± 404 km (251 mi) | 15–33 | 26.3 | ? |
| 2024-10-22 | 2024-10-23; 703 Catalina Sky Survey | 2024 US | 362,486 km (225,238 mi; 0.00242307 AU; 0.94298 LD) | ± 235 km (146 mi) | 6.8–15 | 28.0 | ? |
| 2024-10-23 | 2024-10-23; G96 Mt. Lemmon Survey | 2024 UT | 46,365 km (28,810 mi; 0.00030993 AU; 0.12062 LD) | ± 9 km (5.6 mi) | 2.3–5.2 | 30.3 | ? |
| 2024-10-24 | 2024-10-23; G96 Mt. Lemmon Survey | 2024 UY | 295,390 km (183,550 mi; 0.0019746 AU; 0.7684 LD) | ± 299 km (186 mi) | 3.8–8.6 | 29.2 | ? |
| 2024-10-25 | 2024-10-23; M22 ATLAS South Africa | 2024 UG_{21} | 160,037 km (99,442 mi; 0.00106978 AU; 0.41633 LD) | ± 231 km (144 mi) | 9.8–22 | 27.2 | ? |
| 2024-10-26 | 2024-10-23; M22 ATLAS South Africa | 2024 UN_{2} | 212,397 km (131,977 mi; 0.00141979 AU; 0.55254 LD) | ± 260 km (160 mi) | 15–34 | 26.2 | ? |
| 2024-10-27 | 2024-10-28; 703 Catalina Sky Survey | 2024 UZ_{6} | 17,525 km (10,890 mi; 0.00011715 AU; 0.04559 LD) | ± 24 km (15 mi) | 1.6–3.5 | 31.2 | ? |
| 2024-10-27 | 2024-10-29; G96 Mt. Lemmon Survey | 2024 UD_{8} | 255,594 km (158,819 mi; 0.00170854 AU; 0.66491 LD) | ± 990 km (620 mi) | 4.7–10 | 28.8 | ? |
| 2024-10-28 | 2024-10-29; G96 Mt. Lemmon Survey | 2024 UV_{7} | 218,677 km (135,880 mi; 0.00146177 AU; 0.56887 LD) | ± 408 km (254 mi) | 3.6–7.9 | 29.4 | ? |
| 2024-10-28 | 2024-10-24; G96 Mt. Lemmon Survey | 2024 UQ_{1} | 237,721 km (147,713 mi; 0.00158907 AU; 0.61842 LD) | ± 5 km (3.1 mi) | 7.5–17 | 27.8 | ? |
| 2024-10-28 | 2024-10-27; 703 Catalina Sky Survey | 2024 UO_{4} | 68,794 km (42,747 mi; 0.00045986 AU; 0.17896 LD) | ± 47 km (29 mi) | 2.4–5.4 | 30.2 | ? |
| 2024-10-28 | 2024-10-29; G96 Mt. Lemmon Survey | 2024 UW_{7} | 127,728 km (79,366 mi; 0.00085381 AU; 0.33228 LD) | ± 395 km (245 mi) | 2.3–5.1 | 30.3 | ? |
| 2024-10-30 | 2024-10-30; K88 GINOP-KHK, Piszkesteto | 2024 UB_{11} | 61,264 km (38,068 mi; 0.00040952 AU; 0.15937 LD) | ± 47 km (29 mi) | 2.7–6.0 | 30.0 | ? |
| 2024-10-30 | 2024-10-30; G96 Mt. Lemmon Survey | 2024 UG_{9} | 8,850 km (5,500 mi; 5.92×10^{−5} AU; 0.0230 LD) | ± 2 km (1.2 mi) | 0.80–1.8 | 32.6 | ? |
| 2024-11-01 | 2024-10-31; G96 Mt. Lemmon Survey | 2024 UD_{11} | 213,935 km (132,933 mi; 0.00143007 AU; 0.55654 LD) | ± 418 km (260 mi) | 3.6–8.0 | 29.4 | ? |
| 2024-11-04 | 2024-11-01; G96 Mt. Lemmon Survey | 2024 VO | 287,836 km (178,853 mi; 0.00192406 AU; 0.74879 LD) | ± 246 km (153 mi) | 1.6–3.6 | 31.1 | ? |
| 2024-11-06 | 2024-11-05; W68 ATLAS Chile | 2024 VM_{1} | 310,291 km (192,806 mi; 0.00207417 AU; 0.80720 LD) | ± 152 km (94 mi) | 9.0–20 | 27.4 | ? |
| 2024-11-11 | 2024-11-12; 703 Catalina Sky Survey | 2024 VR_{4} | 29,250 km (18,180 mi; 0.0001955 AU; 0.0761 LD) | ± 123 km (76 mi) | 3.0–6.7 | 29.7 | ? |
| 2024-11-11 | 2024-11-13; G96 Mt. Lemmon Survey | 2024 VP_{4} | 292,533 km (181,772 mi; 0.00195546 AU; 0.76101 LD) | ± 429 km (267 mi) | 4.9–11 | 28.7 | ? |
| 2024-11-13 | 2024-11-12; G96 Mt. Lemmon Survey | 2024 VX_{3} | 148,270 km (92,130 mi; 0.0009911 AU; 0.3857 LD) | ± 166 km (103 mi) | 5.9–13 | 28.3 | ? |
| 2024-11-14 | 2024-11-15; 703 Catalina Sky Survey | 2024 VW_{4} | 234,356 km (145,622 mi; 0.00156657 AU; 0.60966 LD) | ± 452 km (281 mi) | 11–25 | 26.9 | ? |
| 2024-11-14 | 2024-11-16; T08 ATLAS-MLO, Mauna Loa | 2024 WA | 132,305 km (82,211 mi; 0.00088440 AU; 0.34418 LD) | ± 228 km (142 mi) | 11–25 | 26.9 | ? |
| 2024-11-19 | 2024-11-20; T05 ATLAS-HKO, Haleakala | 2024 WJ | 83,373 km (51,806 mi; 0.00055731 AU; 0.21689 LD) | ± 29 km (18 mi) | 3.0–6.7 | 29.8 | ? |
| 2024-11-20 | 2024-11-21; 703 Catalina Sky Survey | 2024 WO | 72,618 km (45,123 mi; 0.00048542 AU; 0.18891 LD) | ± 53 km (33 mi) | 8.6–19 | 27.5 | ? |
| 2024-11-24 | 2024-11-26; G96 Mt. Lemmon Survey | 2024 WU_{24} | 191,742 km (119,143 mi; 0.00128172 AU; 0.49880 LD) | ± 992 km (616 mi) | 7.7–17 | 27.7 | ? |
| 2024-11-24 | 2024-11-22; G96 Mt. Lemmon Survey | 2024 WP_{1} | 113,579 km (70,575 mi; 0.00075923 AU; 0.29547 LD) | ± 167 km (104 mi) | 6.8–15 | 28.0 | ? |
| 2024-11-24 | 2024-11-22; F51 Pan-STARRS 1 | 2024 WW_{2} | 348,350 km (216,450 mi; 0.0023286 AU; 0.9062 LD) | ± 696 km (432 mi) | 5.6–13 | 28.4 | ? |
| 2024-11-24 | 2024-11-22; G96 Mt. Lemmon Survey | 2024 WV_{1} | 173,298 km (107,682 mi; 0.00115843 AU; 0.45082 LD) | ± 81 km (50 mi) | 3.6–8.1 | 29.3 | ? |
| 2024-11-27 | 2024-11-29; G96 Mt. Lemmon Survey | 2024 WG_{12} | 187,854 km (116,727 mi; 0.00125573 AU; 0.48869 LD) | ± 200 km (120 mi) | 3.6–8.0 | 29.4 | ? |
| 2024-11-29 | 2024-11-27; F51 Pan-STARRS 1 | 2024 WF_{5} | 167,321 km (103,968 mi; 0.00111847 AU; 0.43527 LD) | ± 102 km (63 mi) | 5.8–13 | 28.3 | ? |
| 2024-12-01 | 2024-12-02; 703 Catalina Sky Survey | 2024 XK | 381,642 km (237,141 mi; 0.00255112 AU; 0.99282 LD) | ± 340 km (210 mi) | 4.9–11 | 28.7 | ? |
| 2024-12-01 | 2024-12-01; 703 Catalina Sky Survey | 2024 XA | 7,726 km (4,801 mi; 5.165×10^{−5} AU; 0.02010 LD) | ± 3 km (1.9 mi) | 1.2–2.8 | 31.6 | ? |
| 2024-12-02 | 2024-12-03; T08 ATLAS-MLO, Mauna Loa | 2024 XH_{1} | 110,586 km (68,715 mi; 0.00073922 AU; 0.28768 LD) | ± 101 km (63 mi) | 7.8–17 | 27.7 | ? |
| 2024-12-03 | 2024-12-03; T08 ATLAS-MLO, Mauna Loa | 2024 XU_{4} | 368,237 km (228,812 mi; 0.00246151 AU; 0.95795 LD) | ± 499 km (310 mi) | 4.6–10 | 28.8 | ? |
| 2024-12-04 | 2024-12-02; 703 Catalina Sky Survey | 2024 XH | 333,579 km (207,276 mi; 0.00222984 AU; 0.86778 LD) | ± 254 km (158 mi) | 9.0–20 | 27.3 | ? |
| 2024-12-04 | 2024-12-04; 703 Catalina Sky Survey | 2024 XQ_{3} | 30,353 km (18,860 mi; 0.00020290 AU; 0.07896 LD) | ± 19 km (12 mi) | 1.0–2.3 | 32.1 | ? |
| 2024-12-06 | 2024-12-05; T08 ATLAS-MLO, Mauna Loa | 2024 XA_{6} | 29,336 km (18,229 mi; 0.00019610 AU; 0.07632 LD) | ± 14 km (8.7 mi) | 13–30 | 26.5 | ? |
| 2024-12-07 | 2024-12-03; F51 Pan-STARRS 1 | 2024 XS_{2} | 196,270 km (121,960 mi; 0.0013120 AU; 0.5106 LD) | ± 246 km (153 mi) | 3.7–8.2 | 29.3 | ? |
| 2024-12-07 | 2024-12-08; G96 Mt. Lemmon Survey | 2024 XV_{11} | 230,821 km (143,426 mi; 0.00154294 AU; 0.60047 LD) | ± 347 km (216 mi) | 3.7–8.3 | 29.3 | ? |
| 2024-12-08 | 2024-12-10; T05 ATLAS-HKO, Haleakala | 2024 XP_{16} | 163,109 km (101,351 mi; 0.00109032 AU; 0.42432 LD) | ± 149 km (93 mi) | 5.9–13 | 28.3 | ? |
| 2024-12-11 | 2024-12-11; G96 Mt. Lemmon Survey | 2024 XS_{16} | 48,319 km (30,024 mi; 0.00032299 AU; 0.12570 LD) | ± 43 km (27 mi) | 2.2–4.9 | 30.4 | ? |
| 2024-12-19 | 2024-12-20; T08 ATLAS-MLO, Mauna Loa | 2024 YM | 226,348 km (140,646 mi; 0.00151304 AU; 0.58883 LD) | ± 233 km (145 mi) | 8.8–20 | 27.4 | ? |
| 2024-12-25 | 2024-12-24; V00 Kitt Peak-Bok | 2024 YQ_{3} | 116,425 km (72,343 mi; 0.00077825 AU; 0.30287 LD) | ± 663 km (412 mi) | 2.1–4.6 | 30.6 | ? |
| 2024-12-28 | 2024-12-30; K88 GINOP-KHK, Piszkesteto | 2024 YG_{9} | 364,711 km (226,621 mi; 0.00243794 AU; 0.94877 LD) | ± 2,716 km (1,688 mi) | 4.7–10 | 28.8 | ? |
| 2024-12-29 | 2024-12-27; G96 Mt. Lemmon Survey | 2024 YA_{5} | 351,547 km (218,441 mi; 0.00234995 AU; 0.91453 LD) | ± 842 km (523 mi) | 6.7–15 | 28.0 | ? |
| 2024-12-29 | 2024-12-27; K88 GINOP-KHK, Piszkesteto | 2024 YR_{6} | 259,042 km (160,961 mi; 0.00173159 AU; 0.67388 LD) | ± 287 km (178 mi) | 3.0–6.7 | 29.8 | ? |
| 2024-12-30 | 2024-12-29; V00 Kitt Peak-Bok | 2024 YN_{7} | 157,029 km (97,573 mi; 0.00104967 AU; 0.40850 LD) | ± 137 km (85 mi) | 6.1–14 | 28.2 | ? |
| 2024-12-30 | 2024-12-30; G96 Mt. Lemmon Survey | 2024 YW_{8} | 28,323 km (17,599 mi; 0.00018933 AU; 0.07368 LD) | ± 24 km (15 mi) | 0.99–2.2 | 32.1 | ? |
| 2024-12-30 | 2024-12-28; F52 Pan-STARRS 2 | 2024 YJ_{7} | 320,903 km (199,400 mi; 0.00214510 AU; 0.83481 LD) | ± 212 km (132 mi) | 3.5–7.8 | 29.4 | ? |
| 2024-12-31 | 2025-01-01; T08 ATLAS-MLO, Mauna Loa | 2025 AH_{4} | 61,933 km (38,483 mi; 0.00041400 AU; 0.16111 LD) | ± 588 km (365 mi) | 3.0–6.7 | 29.8 | ? |

=== Warning times by size ===
This sub-section visualises the warning times of the close approaches listed in the above table, depending on the size of the asteroid. The sizes of the charts show the relative sizes of the asteroids to scale. For comparison, the approximate size of a person is also shown. This is based the absolute magnitude of each asteroid, an approximate measure of size based on brightness.

Absolute magnitude H ≥ 30 (smallest)

Silhouette of man standing and facing forward

(size of a person for comparison)

Absolute magnitude 30 > H ≥ 29

Absolute magnitude 29 > H ≥ 28

Absolute magnitude 28 > H ≥ 27

Absolute magnitude 27 > H ≥ 26

Absolute magnitude 26 > H ≥ 25

Absolute magnitude 25 > H (largest)

- After closest approach: 2 (66.7%)
- < 24 hours before: 0 (0.0%)
- up to 7 days before: 0 (0.0%)
- > one week before: 1 (33.3%)
- > 7 weeks before: 0 (0.0%)
- > one year before: 0 (0.0%)

== Beyond 1 LD ==
Among asteroids observed during a close approach beyond one lunar distance, 2024 ON (which passed at 0.006682 AU (2.600 LD) on 17 September 2024) was noteworthy as a contact binary with a diameter of 350 m (1,150 ft) imagined by radar.

Below is an example list of near-Earth asteroids discovered prior to 2024 that were predicted to pass more than 1 lunar distance (384,400 km or 0.00256 AU) from Earth in 2024.

| Asteroid | Nearest approach | Date in 2024 |
|---|---|---|
| 2009 JV_{1} | 0.0571 AU (22.2 LD) | 2024-01-05 |
| 2021 BL_{3} | 0.0441 AU (17.2 LD) | 2024-01-23 |
| 2017 BG_{92} | 0.0301 AU (11.7 LD) | 2024-01-25 |
| 2011 CQ_{1} | 0.0289 AU (11.2 LD) | 2024-01-26 |
| 2007 EG | 0.0409 AU (15.9 LD) | 2024-01-30 |
| 2022 OT_{1} | 0.0695 AU (27.0 LD) | 2024-01-31 |
| 2018 CH_{2} | 0.0823 AU (32.0 LD) | 2024-02-01 |
| 2008 OS_{7} | 0.0191 AU (7.4 LD) | 2024-02-02 |
| 2007 BD | 0.166 AU (65 LD) | 2024-02-03 |
| 2023 BG | 0.0544 AU (21.2 LD) | 2024-02-03 |
| 2023 CX_{1} | 0.1 AU (39 LD) | 2024-02-07 |
| 2016 WR | 0.125 AU (49 LD) | 2024-02-09 |
| 2020 DK | 0.0228 AU (8.9 LD) | 2024-02-12 |
| 2018 CY_{2} | 0.089 AU (35 LD) | 2024-02-12 |
| 2011 MD | 0.1063130 AU (41.3738 LD); 0.1511390 AU (58.8187 LD) | 2024-02; 2024-08 |
| 2020 BX_{12} | 0.34 AU (130 LD) | 2024-02 |
| 2022 YO_{1} | 0.014 AU (5.4 LD) | 2024-12-17 |

== See also ==
- List of asteroid close approaches to Earth
- List of asteroid close approaches to Earth in 2023
- List of asteroid close approaches to Earth in 2025
- Asteroid impact prediction
