= 2024 ON =

350m near-Earth object

Discovery
- Discovered by: ATLAS
- Discovery site: Mauna Loa Observatory
- Discovery date: 27 July 2024

Designations
- Minor planet category: NEO; Apollo; PHA

Orbital characteristics
- Epoch 2025-Nov-21 (JD 2461000.5)
- Uncertainty parameter 0
- Observation arc: 4,253 days
- Earliest precovery date: 7 May 2013
- Aphelion: 3.768 AU
- Perihelion: 1.006 AU
- Semi-major axis: 2.387 AU
- Eccentricity: 0.579
- Orbital period (sidereal): 3.688 years
- Mean anomaly: 7.172°
- Mean motion: 0.267°
- Inclination: 7.630°
- Longitude of ascending node: 172.234°
- Argument of perihelion: 185.547°
- Earth MOID: 0.00136 AU
- Jupiter MOID: 1.678 AU

Physical characteristics
- Absolute magnitude (H): 20.49

2024 ON is a near-Earth object and potentially hazardous asteroid with a length of around 350 meters that flew past Earth on 17 September 2024 at a distance of 620,000 miles (1,000,000 km). It was discovered by ATLAS-MLO, Mauna Kea on 27 July 2024. Radar observations showed that 2024 ON is a contact binary.

== See also ==
- 2024 MK – a near-Earth object that made a close approach on 29 June 2024
- List of asteroid close approaches to Earth in 2024
