= List of asteroid close approaches to Earth in 2025 =

- Asteroids which came closer to Earth than the Moon in 2025 by time of discovery
- After closest approach: 94 (49.7%)
- < 24 hours before: 36 (19.0%)
- up to 7 days before: 57 (30.2%)
- > one week before: 2 (1.1%)
- > 7 weeks before: 0 (0.0%)
- > one year before: 0 (0.0%)
Other years
- 2023, 2024, 2025, 2026, 2027

- Asteroids which came closer to Earth than the Moon in 2025 by discoverer
- G96 Mt. Lemmon Survey: 40 (21.1%); 703 Catalina Sky Survey: 38 (20.0%); F52 Pan-STARRS 2: 15 (7.9%); P07 SST, HEH Station: 13 (6.8%); U68 JPL SynTrack RT: 12 (6.3%); F51 Pan-STARRS 1: 11 (5.8%); I41 Palomar Mountain--ZTF: 11 (5.8%); T05 ATLAS-HKO, Haleakala: 10 (5.3%); K88 GINOP-KHK, Piszkesteto: 9 (4.7%); W68 ATLAS Chile, Rio Hurtado: 9 (4.7%); V00 Kitt Peak-Bok: 6 (3.2%); W94 MAP, San Pedro de Atacama: 5 (2.6%); T08 ATLAS-MLO, Manua Loa: 5 (2.6%); M22 ATLAS South Africa: 3 (1.6%); U74 JPL SynTrack RT 2: 1 (0.5%); 106 Crni Vrh: 1 (0.5%); X84 Observatorio Campo dos Amarais: 1 (0.5%)

Below is the list of asteroids that have come close to Earth in 2025.

== Timeline of known close approaches less than one lunar distance from Earth ==
A list of the 189 known near-Earth asteroid close approaches less than 1 lunar distance (0.0025696 AU (384,410 km; 238,860 mi)) from Earth in 2025, based on the close approach database of the Center for Near-Earth Object Studies (CNEOS).

For reference, the radius of Earth is about 0.0000426 AU (0.0166 LD; 6,370 km; 3,960 mi). Geosynchronous satellites have an orbit with semi-major axis length of 0.000282 AU (0.110 LD; 42,200 km; 26,200 mi).

The closest approach of Earth by an asteroid (technically a meteoroid) was that of 2025 UC11, which has a diameter of 0.41–0.93 m (1.3–3.1 ft). 2025 UC11 approached at about 6,599 km (4,100 mi; 4.411×10^{−5} AU; 0.01717 LD) from the center of the Earth, or 221 km (137 mi) above its surface. The largest asteroid to pass within 1 LD of Earth in 2025 was 2025 RM_{1} at 31–69 m (102–226 ft) in diameter, for an absolute magnitude of 24.7. The fastest asteroid to pass within 1 LD of Earth in 2025 was 2025 WM_{20} that passed Earth with a velocity with respect to Earth of 28.36 km/s (63,400 mph), while the slowest bypass within lunar distance was that of 2025 KX_{2} at a velocity with respect to Earth of 3.13 km/s (7,000 mph).

The CNEOS database of close approaches lists some close approaches a full orbit or more before the discovery of the object, derived by orbit calculation. The list below only includes close approaches that are evidenced by observations, thus the pre-discovery close approaches would only be included if the object was found by precovery, but there was no such close approach in 2025.

This list and the relevant databases do not consider impacts as close approaches, thus this list does not include any of the objects that collided with Earth's atmosphere in 2025, none of which were discovered in advance, but were observed visually or recorded by infrasound sensors designed to detect detonation of nuclear devices.

Rows highlighted red indicate objects which were not discovered until after closest approach

Rows highlighted yellow indicate objects discovered less than 24 hours before closest approach

Rows highlighted green indicate objects discovered more than one week before closest approach

Rows highlighted turquoise indicate objects discovered more than 7 weeks before closest approach

Rows highlighted blue indicate objects discovered more than one year before closest approach
(i.e. objects successfully cataloged on a previous orbit, rather than being detected during final approach)

Date of closest approach	Discovery (Note: Discovery date (first reported image), and if the object was confirmed and previously undiscovered, the discoverer)	Object	Nominal geocentric distance (Note: Distance from the center of Earth to the center of the object. See the NASA/JPL Solar System Dynamics Glossary: Geocentric. Earth has an equatorial radius of 6,378 km (3,963 mi; 0.01659 LD).)	Uncertainty region (3-sigma)	Approx. size (m)	(H) (abs. mag.)	Closer approach to Moon (Note: Objects that approached closer to the Moon than Earth are marked with a check.)
2025-01-02	2025-01-01; T05 ATLAS-HKO, Haleakala	2025 AC	140,221 km (87,129 mi; 0.00093732 AU; 0.36478 LD)	± 4 km (2.5 mi)	4.2–9.3	29.0	?
2025-01-03	2025-01-01; 703 Catalina Sky Survey	2025 AB	153,127 km (95,149 mi; 0.00102359 AU; 0.39835 LD)	± 56 km (35 mi)	10.0–22	27.1	?
2025-01-11	2025-01-12; T05 ATLAS-HKO, Haleakala	2025 AZ_{3}	228,226 km (141,813 mi; 0.00152560 AU; 0.59372 LD)	± 275 km (171 mi)	17–39	25.9	?
2025-01-14	2025-01-19; G96 Mt. Lemmon Survey	2025 BA_{1}	274,971 km (170,859 mi; 0.00183807 AU; 0.71532 LD)	± 2,320 km (1,440 mi)	8.1–18	27.6	?
2025-01-17	2025-01-17; M22 ATLAS South Africa	2025 BD	240,561 km (149,478 mi; 0.00160805 AU; 0.62580 LD)	± 131 km (81 mi)	10–23	27.1	?
2025-01-18	2025-01-20; F52 Pan-STARRS 2	2025 BF_{7}	195,446 km (121,445 mi; 0.00130648 AU; 0.50844 LD)	± 152 km (94 mi)	2.8–6.2	29.9	?
2025-01-18	2025-01-19; T08 ATLAS-MLO, Mauna Loa	2025 BN	323,245 km (200,855 mi; 0.00216076 AU; 0.84090 LD)	± 177 km (110 mi)	15–33	26.3	?
2025-01-20	2025-01-21; 703 Catalina Sky Survey	2025 BT_{4}	120,253 km (74,722 mi; 0.00080384 AU; 0.31283 LD)	± 277 km (172 mi)	5.1–11	28.6	?
2025-01-23	2025-01-24; G96 Mt. Lemmon Survey	2025 BP_{4}	320,380 km (199,070 mi; 0.0021416 AU; 0.8334 LD)	± 3,089 km (1,919 mi)	3.7–8.3	29.3	?
2025-01-23	2025-01-29; F51 Pan-STARRS 1	2025 BO_{16}	224,551 km (139,530 mi; 0.00150103 AU; 0.58416 LD)	± 1,464 km (910 mi)	12–27	26.7	?
2025-01-26	2025-01-26; G96 Mt. Lemmon Survey	2025 BP_{6}	9,712 km (6,035 mi; 6.492×10^{−5} AU; 0.02527 LD)	± 26 km (16 mi)	1.1–2.6	31.8	?
2025-02-03	2025-02-02; G96 Mt. Lemmon Survey	2025 CF	124,257 km (77,210 mi; 0.00083061 AU; 0.32325 LD)	± 75 km (47 mi)	2.8–6.3	29.9	?
2025-02-04	2025-01-21; T05 ATLAS-HKO, Haleakala	2025 BB_{2}	291,452 km (181,100 mi; 0.00194824 AU; 0.75819 LD)	± 2 km (1.2 mi)	20–44	25.6	?
2025-02-05	2025-02-02; T05 ATLAS-HKO, Haleakala	2025 CM	322,922 km (200,654 mi; 0.00215860 AU; 0.84006 LD)	± 284 km (176 mi)	11–24	27.0	?
2025-02-07	2025-02-05; V00 Kitt Peak-Bok	2025 CZ_{1}	314,011 km (195,117 mi; 0.00209903 AU; 0.81688 LD)	± 287 km (178 mi)	3.6–8.0	29.4	?
2025-02-15	2025-02-17; G96 Mt. Lemmon Survey	2025 DC	284,647 km (176,871 mi; 0.00190275 AU; 0.74049 LD)	± 658 km (409 mi)	8.6–19	27.5	?
2025-02-17	2025-02-19; G96 Mt. Lemmon Survey	2025 DT_{5}	214,811 km (133,477 mi; 0.00143592 AU; 0.55882 LD)	± 804 km (500 mi)	3.7–8.2	29.3	?
2025-02-18	2025-02-19; G96 Mt. Lemmon Survey	2025 DW	122,573 km (76,163 mi; 0.00081935 AU; 0.31887 LD)	± 120 km (75 mi)	1.8–4.1	30.8	?
2025-02-19	2025-02-17; 703 Catalina Sky Survey	2025 DF	278,598 km (173,113 mi; 0.00186231 AU; 0.72476 LD)	± 32 km (20 mi)	6.2–14	28.2	?
2025-02-21	2025-02-18; G96 Mt. Lemmon Survey	2025 DQ	299,236 km (185,937 mi; 0.00200027 AU; 0.77844 LD)	± 501 km (311 mi)	2.7–6.1	30.0	?
2025-02-22	2025-02-20; K88 GINOP-KHK, Piszkesteto	2025 DK_{1}	150,543 km (93,543 mi; 0.00100632 AU; 0.39163 LD)	± 99 km (62 mi)	2.4–5.4	30.2	?
2025-02-22	2025-02-21; G96 Mt. Lemmon Survey	2025 DS_{1}	154,713 km (96,134 mi; 0.00103419 AU; 0.40248 LD)	± 130 km (81 mi)	2.3–5.2	30.3	?
2025-02-23	2025-02-22; G96 Mt. Lemmon Survey	2025 DZ_{2}	187,671 km (116,613 mi; 0.00125450 AU; 0.48821 LD)	± 130 km (81 mi)	3.3–7.3	29.5	?
2025-02-25	2025-02-21; F51 Pan-STARRS 1	2025 DT_{2}	289,970 km (180,180 mi; 0.0019383 AU; 0.7543 LD)	± 141 km (88 mi)	13–29	26.6	?
2025-02-26	2025-02-24; G96 Mt. Lemmon Survey	2025 DN_{6}	298,312 km (185,362 mi; 0.00199409 AU; 0.77604 LD)	± 375 km (233 mi)	2.5–5.6	30.1	?
2025-02-28	2025-03-01; 703 Catalina Sky Survey	2025 EK	262,122 km (162,875 mi; 0.00175218 AU; 0.68189 LD)	± 407 km (253 mi)	5.2–12	28.5	?
2025-03-03	2025-03-02; K88 GINOP-KHK, Piszkesteto	2025 EL	342,840 km (213,030 mi; 0.0022917 AU; 0.8919 LD)	± 414 km (257 mi)	3.8–8.5	29.2	?
2025-03-06	2025-03-04; K88 GINOP-KHK, Piszkesteto	2025 EX_{1}	218,167 km (135,563 mi; 0.00145836 AU; 0.56755 LD)	± 164 km (102 mi)	1.9–4.1	30.8	?
2025-03-06	2025-03-03; W68 ATLAS Chile, Rio Hurtado	2025 EW	355,119 km (220,661 mi; 0.00237382 AU; 0.92382 LD)	± 233 km (145 mi)	9.2–21	27.3	?
2025-03-08	2025-03-09; I41 Palomar Mountain--ZTF	2025 EV_{3}	144,209 km (89,607 mi; 0.00096398 AU; 0.37515 LD)	± 131 km (81 mi)	11–26	26.8	?
2025-03-18	2025-03-19; 703 Catalina Sky Survey	2025 FC	66,173 km (41,118 mi; 0.00044234 AU; 0.17214 LD)	± 69 km (43 mi)	4.6–10	28.8	?
2025-03-21	2025-03-22; 703 Catalina Sky Survey	2025 FN_{7}	81,966 km (50,931 mi; 0.00054791 AU; 0.21323 LD)	± 124 km (77 mi)	1.9–4.2	30.7	?
2025-03-22	2025-03-22; K88 GINOP-KHK, Piszkesteto	2025 FX_{6}	161,564 km (100,391 mi; 0.00107999 AU; 0.42030 LD)	± 257 km (160 mi)	3.5–7.8	29.4	?
2025-03-23	2025-03-23; V00 Kitt Peak-Bok	2025 FY_{6}	21,944 km (13,635 mi; 0.00014669 AU; 0.05709 LD)	± 158 km (98 mi)	1.7–3.9	30.9	?
2025-03-23	2025-03-22; G96 Mt. Lemmon Survey	2025 FC_{2}	252,897 km (157,143 mi; 0.00169051 AU; 0.65790 LD)	± 425 km (264 mi)	5.6–12	28.4	?
2025-03-24	2025-03-23; G96 Mt. Lemmon Survey	2025 FK_{14}	337,101 km (209,465 mi; 0.00225338 AU; 0.87695 LD)	± 427 km (265 mi)	3.1–7	29.6	?
2025-03-24	2025-03-23; F52 Pan-STARRS 2	2025 FK_{3}	122,134 km (75,891 mi; 0.00081642 AU; 0.31772 LD)	± 127 km (79 mi)	4–9	29.1	?
2025-03-24	2025-03-23; G96 Mt. Lemmon Survey	2025 FZ_{6}	350,631 km (217,872 mi; 0.00234382 AU; 0.91214 LD)	± 31,519 km (19,585 mi)	5.8–13	28.3	?
2025-03-24	2025-03-22; F52 Pan-STARRS 2	2025 FX_{2}	274,009 km (170,261 mi; 0.00183164 AU; 0.71282 LD)	± 314 km (195 mi)	8.6–19	27.5	?
2025-03-25	2025-03-31; F51 Pan-STARRS 1	2025 FH_{25}	248,077 km (154,148 mi; 0.00165829 AU; 0.64536 LD)	± 7,616 km (4,732 mi)	5.0–11	28.6	?
2025-03-26	2025-03-28; G96 Mt. Lemmon Survey	2025 FZ_{15}	165,832 km (103,043 mi; 0.00110852 AU; 0.43140 LD)	± 338 km (210 mi)	3.8–8.6	29.2	?
2025-03-26	2025-03-25; G96 Mt. Lemmon Survey	2025 FE_{18}	361,784 km (224,802 mi; 0.00241838 AU; 0.94116 LD)	± 905 km (562 mi)	3.5–7.8	29.4	?
2025-03-28	2025-03-27; 703 Catalina Sky Survey	2025 FV_{12}	101,643 km (63,158 mi; 0.00067944 AU; 0.26442 LD)	± 95 km (59 mi)	2.4–5.5	30.2	?
2025-03-28	2025-03-25; G96 Mt. Lemmon Survey	2025 FB_{8}	118,661 km (73,733 mi; 0.00079320 AU; 0.30869 LD)	± 143 km (89 mi)	5.3–12	28.5	?
2025-04-02	2025-04-01; W94 MAP, San Pedro de Atacama	2025 GA	85,028 km (52,834 mi; 0.00056838 AU; 0.22119 LD)	± 78 km (48 mi)	4.8–11	28.7	?
2025-04-02	2025-03-31; F51 Pan-STARRS 1	2025 FM_{18}	277,547 km (172,460 mi; 0.00185529 AU; 0.72202 LD)	± 323 km (201 mi)	3.6–8.1	29.3	?
2025-04-05	2025-04-02; W94 MAP, San Pedro de Atacama	2025 GS	170,834 km (106,151 mi; 0.00114195 AU; 0.44441 LD)	± 129 km (80 mi)	5.8–13	28.3	?
2025-04-06	2025-04-07; 703 Catalina Sky Survey	2025 GY	346,161 km (215,094 mi; 0.00231394 AU; 0.90052 LD)	± 459 km (285 mi)	5.5–12	28.4	?
2025-04-15	2025-04-15; 703 Catalina Sky Survey	2025 GS_{1}	37,990 km (23,610 mi; 0.0002539 AU; 0.0988 LD)	± 41 km (25 mi)	3.4–7.7	29.4	?
2025-04-17	2025-04-18; 703 Catalina Sky Survey	2025 HH	27,855 km (17,308 mi; 0.00018620 AU; 0.07246 LD)	± 28 km (17 mi)	1.9–4.2	30.8	?
2025-04-19	2025-04-20; 703 Catalina Sky Survey	2025 HO	187,100 km (116,300 mi; 0.001251 AU; 0.487 LD)	± 374 km (232 mi)	3.6–8.1	29.3	?
2025-04-20	2025-04-21; W68 ATLAS Chile, Rio Hurtado	2025 HA_{1}	116,300 km (72,300 mi; 0.000777 AU; 0.303 LD)	± 228 km (142 mi)	19–43	25.7	?
2025-04-28	2025-04-26; W94 MAP, San Pedro de Atacama	2025 HP_{4}	338,928 km (210,600 mi; 0.00226559 AU; 0.88170 LD)	± 211 km (131 mi)	7.9–18	27.6	?
2025-05-01	2025-05-01; 106 Crni Vrh	2025 JF	173,735 km (107,954 mi; 0.00116135 AU; 0.45196 LD)	± 686 km (426 mi)	5.2–12	28.6	?
2025-05-01	2025-05-02; 703 Catalina Sky Survey	2025 JB	199,575 km (124,010 mi; 0.00133408 AU; 0.51918 LD)	± 638 km (396 mi)	8.3–19	27.5	?
2025-05-08	2025-05-02; F52 Pan-STARRS 2	2025 JE	366,504 km (227,735 mi; 0.00244993 AU; 0.95344 LD)	± 201 km (125 mi)	5.0–11	28.6	?
2025-05-21	2025-05-21; P07 Space Surveillance Telescope	2025 KF_{2}	139,791 km (86,862 mi; 0.00093445 AU; 0.36366 LD)	± 2,273 km (1,412 mi)	1.4–3.2	31.4	?
2025-05-21	2025-05-19; W94 MAP, San Pedro de Atacama	2025 KF	115,160 km (71,560 mi; 0.0007698 AU; 0.2996 LD)	± 106 km (66 mi)	10.0–22	27.1	?
2025-05-22	2025-05-24; F52 Pan-STARRS 2	2025 KX_{2}	367,600 km (228,400 mi; 0.002457 AU; 0.956 LD)	± 109 km (68 mi)	2.8–6.2	27.1	?
2025-05-22	2025-05-23; T08 ATLAS-MLO, Mauna Loa	2025 KS_{1}	146,114 km (90,791 mi; 0.00097671 AU; 0.38011 LD)	± 45 km (28 mi)	12–27	26.7	?
2025-05-23	2025-05-21; 703 Catalina Sky Survey	2025 KE_{1}	192,993 km (119,920 mi; 0.00129008 AU; 0.50206 LD)	± 113 km (70 mi)	13–29	26.5	?
2025-05-23	2025-05-26; V00 Kitt Peak-Bok	2025 KF_{4}	279,632 km (173,755 mi; 0.00186922 AU; 0.72744 LD)	± 500 km (310 mi)	4.8–11	28.7	?
2025-05-26	2025-05-25; F51 Pan-STARRS 1	2025 KQ_{4}	162,057 km (100,698 mi; 0.00108328 AU; 0.42158 LD)	± 369 km (229 mi)	3.0–6.6	29.8	?
2025-05-28	2025-05-25; F52 Pan-STARRS 2	2025 KX_{3}	339,702 km (211,081 mi; 0.00227077 AU; 0.88371 LD)	± 281 km (175 mi)	8.0–18	27.6	?
2025-06-04	2025-06-01; F51 Pan-STARRS 1	2025 LB	152,004 km (94,451 mi; 0.00101608 AU; 0.39543 LD)	± 131 km (81 mi)	12–26	26.8	?
2025-06-07	2025-06-05; G96 Mt. Lemmon Survey	2025 LN	246,821 km (153,367 mi; 0.00164990 AU; 0.64209 LD)	± 159 km (99 mi)	4.4–9.9	28.9	?
2025-06-08	2025-06-05; F51 Pan-STARRS 1	2025 LK	99,242 km (61,666 mi; 0.00066339 AU; 0.25817 LD)	± 45 km (28 mi)	11–25	26.9	?
2025-06-15	2025-06-15; 703 Catalina Sky Survey	2025 LD_{1}	210,748 km (130,953 mi; 0.00140876 AU; 0.54825 LD)	± 232 km (144 mi)	7.4–17	27.8	?
2025-06-17	2025-06-16; G96 Mt. Lemmon Survey	2025 MC	198,682 km (123,455 mi; 0.00132811 AU; 0.51686 LD)	± 275 km (171 mi)	5.0–11	28.6	?
2025-06-18	2025-06-16; V00 Kitt Peak-Bok	2025 MB	134,974 km (83,869 mi; 0.00090225 AU; 0.35113 LD)	± 130 km (81 mi)	3.0–6.6	29.8	?
2025-06-24	2025-06-21; F52 Pan-STARRS 2	2025 MS_{1}	314,094 km (195,169 mi; 0.00209959 AU; 0.81710 LD)	± 257 km (160 mi)	2.8–6.4	29.9	?
2025-06-29	2025-06-30; 703 Catalina Sky Survey	2025 MJ_{91}	70,070 km (43,540 mi; 0.0004684 AU; 0.1823 LD)	± 151 km (94 mi)	8.4–19	27.5	?
2025-06-30	2025-07-01; W68 ATLAS Chile, Rio Hurtado	2025 NA	297,255 km (184,706 mi; 0.00198703 AU; 0.77329 LD)	± 263 km (163 mi)	8.5–19	27.5	?
2025-07-02	2025-07-02; P07 Space Surveillance Telescope	2025 NO_{1}	256,205 km (159,198 mi; 0.00171262 AU; 0.66650 LD)	± 2,843 km (1,767 mi)	1.5–3.4	31.2	?
2025-07-02	2025-07-02; P07 Space Surveillance Telescope	2025 NN_{1}	160,280 km (99,590 mi; 0.0010714 AU; 0.4170 LD)	± 2,085 km (1,296 mi)	2.4–5.3	30.3	?
2025-07-04	2025-07-04; P07 Space Surveillance Telescope	2025 NH_{1}	93,521 km (58,111 mi; 0.00062515 AU; 0.24329 LD)	± 1,107 km (688 mi)	1.7–3.8	31.0	?
2025-07-15	2025-07-17; W68 ATLAS Chile, Rio Hurtado	2025 OF	366,101 km (227,485 mi; 0.00244723 AU; 0.95239 LD)	± 523 km (325 mi)	13–28	26.6	?
2025-07-17	2025-07-15; I41 Palomar Mountain--ZTF	2025 OC	296,102 km (183,989 mi; 0.00197932 AU; 0.77029 LD)	± 532 km (331 mi)	7.1–16	27.9	?
2025-07-19	2025-07-19; W68 ATLAS Chile, Rio Hurtado	2025 OS	10,457 km (6,498 mi; 6.990×10^{−5} AU; 0.02720 LD)	± 6 km (3.7 mi)	2.7–6.1	29.9	?
2025-07-19	2025-07-20; I41 Palomar Mountain--ZTF	2025 OM_{2}	88,151 km (54,774 mi; 0.00058925 AU; 0.22932 LD)	± 515 km (320 mi)	3.6–7.9	29.4	?
2025-07-29	2025-07-28; M22 ATLAS South Africa	2025 OL_{5}	131,825 km (81,912 mi; 0.00088120 AU; 0.34293 LD)	± 86 km (53 mi)	7.0–16	27.9	?
2025-07-31	2025-08-01; U68 JPL SynTrack Robotic Telescope	2025 PC	112,244 km (69,745 mi; 0.00075030 AU; 0.29200 LD)	± 204 km (127 mi)	3.5–7.7	29.4	?
2025-08-02	2025-08-03; U68 JPL SynTrack Robotic Telescope	2025 PU	52,987 km (32,925 mi; 0.00035420 AU; 0.13784 LD)	± 80 km (50 mi)	2.2–4.8	30.5	?
2025-08-09	2025-08-07; M22 ATLAS South Africa	2025 PQ_{1}	325,698 km (202,379 mi; 0.00217716 AU; 0.84728 LD)	± 420 km (260 mi)	11–26	26.8	?
2025-08-13	2025-08-13; K88 GINOP-KHK, Piszkesteto	2025 PU_{1}	29,273 km (18,189 mi; 0.00019568 AU; 0.07615 LD)	± 11 km (6.8 mi)	1.4–3.1	31.4	?
2025-08-15	2025-08-15; U74 JPL SynTrack Robotic Telescope 2	2025 PF_{2}	22,361 km (13,894 mi; 0.00014947 AU; 0.05817 LD)	± 26 km (16 mi)	2.5–5.6	30.1	?
2025-08-15	2025-08-14; T05 ATLAS-HKO, Haleakala	2025 PW_{1}	276,959 km (172,094 mi; 0.00185136 AU; 0.72049 LD)	± 318 km (198 mi)	7.6–17	27.7	?
2025-08-18	2025-08-14; F52 Pan-STARRS 2	2025 PY_{1}	295,328 km (183,508 mi; 0.00197415 AU; 0.76828 LD)	± 420 km (260 mi)	7.6–17	27.7	?
2025-08-21	2025-08-22; K88 GINOP-KHK, Piszkesteto	2025 QM_{3}	204,097 km (126,820 mi; 0.00136430 AU; 0.53095 LD)	± 344 km (214 mi)	4.7–10	28.8	?
2025-08-27	2025-08-29; F51 Pan-STARRS 1	2025 QK_{17}	100,066 km (62,178 mi; 0.00066890 AU; 0.26032 LD)	± 355 km (221 mi)	2.5–5.6	30.1	?
2025-08-31	2025-08-26; X74 Observatorio Campo dos Amarais	2025 QO_{7}	272,817 km (169,521 mi; 0.00182367 AU; 0.70972 LD)	± 57 km (35 mi)	11–24	27.0	?
2025-09-02	2025-09-02; P07 Space Surveillance Telescope	2025 RO_{1}	298,400 km (185,400 mi; 0.001995 AU; 0.776 LD)	± 12,313 km (7,651 mi)	2.0–4.4	30.7	?
2025-09-02	2025-09-02; P07 Space Surveillance Telescope	2025 RN_{1}	127,178 km (79,025 mi; 0.00085013 AU; 0.33085 LD)	± 3,769 km (2,342 mi)	2.1–4.7	30.5	?
2025-09-03	2025-08-26; F51 Pan-STARRS 1	2025 QD_{8}	218,328 km (135,663 mi; 0.00145943 AU; 0.56797 LD)	± 78 km (48 mi)	16–36	26.1	?
2025-09-03	2025-09-04; T05 ATLAS-HKO, Haleakala	2025 RM_{1}	103,306 km (64,191 mi; 0.00069056 AU; 0.26874 LD)	± 119 km (74 mi)	31–69	24.7	?
2025-09-12	2025-09-12; P07 Space Surveillance Telescope	2025 RW_{14}	96,895 km (60,208 mi; 0.00064770 AU; 0.25207 LD)	± 2,234 km (1,388 mi)	1.3–2.8	31.6	?
2025-09-13	2025-09-14; G96 Mt. Lemmon Survey	2025 RM_{2}	340,164 km (211,368 mi; 0.00227386 AU; 0.88492 LD)	± 1,049 km (652 mi)	6.4–14	28.1	?
2025-09-13	2025-09-15; T05 ATLAS-HKO, Haleakala	2025 RN_{4}	65,698 km (40,823 mi; 0.00043916 AU; 0.17091 LD)	± 100 km (62 mi)	5.3–12	28.5	?
2025-09-15	2025-09-15; 703 Catalina Sky Survey	2025 RP_{3}	121,308 km (75,377 mi; 0.00081089 AU; 0.31558 LD)	± 77 km (48 mi)	3.1–6.8	29.7	?
2025-09-15	2025-09-14; 703 Catalina Sky Survey	2025 RJ_{2}	301,283 km (187,209 mi; 0.00201395 AU; 0.78377 LD)	± 258 km (160 mi)	2.9–6.5	29.8	?
2025-09-16	2025-09-14; W68 ATLAS Chile, Rio Hurtado	2025 RZ_{2}	203,154 km (126,234 mi; 0.00135800 AU; 0.52849 LD)	± 201 km (125 mi)	17–38	26.0	?
2025-09-16	2025-09-18; F52 Pan-STARRS 2	2025 SX_{1}	125,564 km (78,022 mi; 0.00083934 AU; 0.32665 LD)	± 365 km (227 mi)	5.7–13	28.4	?
2025-09-16	2025-09-17; T05 ATLAS-HKO, Haleakala	2025 SU	267,414 km (166,163 mi; 0.00178755 AU; 0.69566 LD)	± 186 km (116 mi)	5.5–12	28.4	?
2025-09-19	2025-09-13; V00 Kitt Peak-Bok	2025 RL_{2}	216,484 km (134,517 mi; 0.00144711 AU; 0.56317 LD)	± 170 km (110 mi)	17–37	26.0	?
2025-09-19	2025-09-18; K88 GINOP-KHK, Piszkesteto	2025 SY_{1}	57,211 km (35,549 mi; 0.00038243 AU; 0.14883 LD)	± 47 km (29 mi)	1.2–2.8	31.7	?
2025-09-22	2025-09-23; G96 Mt. Lemmon Survey	2025 ST_{4}	86,971 km (54,041 mi; 0.00058137 AU; 0.22625 LD)	± 149 km (93 mi)	4.2–9.4	29.0	?
2025-09-23	2025-09-24; I41 Palomar Mountain--ZTF	2025 SK_{12}	300,466 km (186,701 mi; 0.00200849 AU; 0.78164 LD)	± 1,411 km (877 mi)	4.4–9.9	28.9	?
2025-09-23	2025-09-23; 703 Catalina Sky Survey	2025 SV_{4}	229,858 km (142,827 mi; 0.00153651 AU; 0.59796 LD)	± 326 km (203 mi)	2.6–5.9	30.0	?
2025-09-24	2025-09-24; 703 Catalina Sky Survey	2025 SU_{7}	71,975 km (44,723 mi; 0.00048112 AU; 0.18724 LD)	± 42 km (26 mi)	1.8–4.0	30.9	?
2025-09-24	2025-09-23; G96 Mt. Lemmon Survey	2025 SU_{4}	22,381 km (13,907 mi; 0.00014961 AU; 0.05822 LD)	± 11 km (6.8 mi)	1.1–2.6	31.8	?
2025-09-26	2025-09-27; W94 MAP, San Pedro de Atacama	2025 SL_{15}	237,180 km (147,380 mi; 0.0015855 AU; 0.6170 LD)	± 936 km (582 mi)	5.1–11	28.6	?
2025-09-26	2025-09-24; G96 Mt. Lemmon Survey	2025 SS_{7}	286,758 km (178,183 mi; 0.00191686 AU; 0.74598 LD)	± 224 km (139 mi)	2.6–5.8	30.1	?
2025-09-27	2025-09-28; W68 ATLAS Chile, Rio Hurtado	2025 SG_{15}	350,925 km (218,055 mi; 0.00234579 AU; 0.91291 LD)	± 122 km (76 mi)	18–41	25.8	?
2025-09-28	2025-09-29; 703 Catalina Sky Survey	2025 SO_{20}	136,893 km (85,061 mi; 0.00091507 AU; 0.35612 LD)	± 138 km (86 mi)	5.6–12	28.4	?
2025-09-28	2025-09-28; P07 Space Surveillance Telescope	2025 SB_{21}	233,994 km (145,397 mi; 0.00156415 AU; 0.60872 LD)	± 6,528 km (4,056 mi)	1.4–3.2	31.3	?
2025-09-28	2025-09-23; G96 Mt. Lemmon Survey	2025 SS_{5}	104,352 km (64,841 mi; 0.00069755 AU; 0.27147 LD)	± 51 km (32 mi)	7.0–16	27.9	?
2025-09-30	2025-10-01; 703 Catalina Sky Survey	2025 TE	279,945 km (173,950 mi; 0.00187132 AU; 0.72826 LD)	± 297 km (185 mi)	5.4–12	28.4	?
2025-10-01	2025-10-01; V00 Kitt Peak-Bok	2025 TF	6,780 km (4,210 mi; 4.53×10^{−5} AU; 0.0176 LD)	± 13 km (8.1 mi)	1.2–2.7	31.7	?
2025-10-01	2025-10-02; G96 Mt. Lemmon Survey	2025 TQ	310,829 km (193,140 mi; 0.00207776 AU; 0.80860 LD)	± 645 km (401 mi)	4.4–9.8	28.9	?
2025-10-01	2025-10-02; G96 Mt. Lemmon Survey	2025 TP	107,634 km (66,881 mi; 0.00071949 AU; 0.28000 LD)	± 233 km (145 mi)	3.8–8.6	29.2	?
2025-10-02	2025-10-03; G96 Mt. Lemmon Survey	2025 TP_{1}	225,411 km (140,064 mi; 0.00150678 AU; 0.58639 LD)	± 340 km (210 mi)	8.4–19	27.5	?
2025-10-02	2025-10-02; G96 Mt. Lemmon Survey	2025 TQ_{2}	11,239 km (6,984 mi; 7.513×10^{−5} AU; 0.02924 LD)	± 6 km (3.7 mi)	2.0–4.4	30.6	?
2025-10-03	2025-10-01; F51 Pan-STARRS 1	2025 TC	85,671 km (53,233 mi; 0.00057268 AU; 0.22287 LD)	± 73 km (45 mi)	10–23	27.0	?
2025-10-10	2025-10-12; F51 Pan-STARRS 1	2025 TN_{5}	136,642 km (84,905 mi; 0.00091340 AU; 0.35547 LD)	± 583 km (362 mi)	6.9–16	27.9	?
2025-10-13	2025-10-13; I41 Palomar Mountain--ZTF	2025 TS_{14}	219,495 km (136,388 mi; 0.00146723 AU; 0.57100 LD)	± 321 km (199 mi)	2.6–5.8	30.1	?
2025-10-15	2025-10-15; P07 Space Surveillance Telescope	2025 TV_{15}	259,304 km (161,124 mi; 0.00173334 AU; 0.67456 LD)	± 17,430 km (10,830 mi)	1.1–2.4	32.0	?
2025-10-15	2025-10-13; T08 ATLAS-MLO, Mauna Loa	2025 TP_{5}	97,199 km (60,397 mi; 0.00064974 AU; 0.25286 LD)	± 58 km (36 mi)	13–29	26.6	?
2025-10-16	2025-10-17; I41 Palomar Mountain--ZTF	2025 UN	172,026 km (106,892 mi; 0.00114992 AU; 0.44751 LD)	± 134 km (83 mi)	4.6–10	28.8	?
2025-10-18	2025-10-19; I41 Palomar Mountain--ZTF	2025 UC_{6}	269,937 km (167,731 mi; 0.00180442 AU; 0.70222 LD)	± 435 km (270 mi)	3.4–7.5	29.5	?
2025-10-18	2025-10-19; 703 Catalina Sky Survey	2025 UM_{1}	108,560 km (67,460 mi; 0.0007257 AU; 0.2824 LD)	± 344 km (214 mi)	3.3–7.3	29.6	?
2025-10-19	2025-10-19; 703 Catalina Sky Survey	2025 UW_{107}	12,281 km (7,631 mi; 8.209×10^{−5} AU; 0.03195 LD)	± 58 km (36 mi)	1.2–2.6	31.8	?
2025-10-21	2025-10-20; F52 Pan-STARRS 2	2025 UJ_{4}	61,681 km (38,327 mi; 0.00041231 AU; 0.16046 LD)	± 93 km (58 mi)	2.5–5.5	30.2	?
2025-10-22	2025-10-22; P07 Space Surveillance Telescope	2025 UC_{12}	283,260 km (176,010 mi; 0.0018935 AU; 0.7369 LD)	± 15,635 km (9,715 mi)	1.8–4.0	30.9	?
2025-10-22	2025-10-20; K88 GINOP-KHK, Piszkesteto	2025 UC_{2}	355,988 km (221,201 mi; 0.00237963 AU; 0.92608 LD)	± 665 km (413 mi)	6.6–15	28.0	?
2025-10-22	2025-10-22; P07 Space Surveillance Telescope	2025 UD_{12}	255,977 km (159,057 mi; 0.00171110 AU; 0.66591 LD)	± 55,985 km (34,787 mi)	3.8–8.4	29.2	?
2025-10-22	2025-10-19; G96 Mt. Lemmon Survey	2025 UE_{1}	264,902 km (164,602 mi; 0.00177076 AU; 0.68913 LD)	± 156 km (97 mi)	12–28	26.7	?
2025-10-23	2025-10-25; 703 Catalina Sky Survey	2025 UG_{6}	137,660 km (85,540 mi; 0.0009202 AU; 0.3581 LD)	± 253 km (157 mi)	5.7–13	28.4	?
2025-10-24	2025-10-25; I41 Palomar Mountain--ZTF	2025 UC_{97}	367,174 km (228,151 mi; 0.00245441 AU; 0.95518 LD)	± 1,092 km (679 mi)	5.6–13	28.4	?
2025-10-25	2025-10-24; 703 Catalina Sky Survey	2025 US_{5}	235,594 km (146,391 mi; 0.00157485 AU; 0.61288 LD)	± 439 km (273 mi)	2.4–5.3	30.2	?
2025-10-25	2025-10-25; P07 Space Surveillance Telescope	2025 UA_{12}	202,007 km (125,521 mi; 0.00135033 AU; 0.52551 LD)	± 1,632 km (1,014 mi)	2.5–5.6	30.1	?
2025-10-25	2025-10-26; 703 Catalina Sky Survey	2025 UV_{6}	202,954 km (126,110 mi; 0.00135666 AU; 0.52797 LD)	± 292 km (181 mi)	5.8–13	28.3	?
2025-10-27	2025-10-28; 703 Catalina Sky Survey	2025 UZ_{7}	122,544 km (76,145 mi; 0.00081916 AU; 0.31879 LD)	± 138 km (86 mi)	3.2–7.1	29.6	?
2025-10-28	2025-10-29; T05 ATLAS-HKO, Haleakala	2025 UD_{9}	234,755 km (145,870 mi; 0.00156924 AU; 0.61070 LD)	± 218 km (135 mi)	9.8–22	27.2	?
2025-10-29	2025-10-28; G96 Mt. Lemmon Survey	2025 UV_{7}	100,073 km (62,182 mi; 0.00066895 AU; 0.26033 LD)	± 66 km (41 mi)	2.7–6.0	30.0	?
2025-10-29	2025-10-28; W68 ATLAS Chile, Rio Hurtado	2025 UF_{9}	289,948 km (180,165 mi; 0.00193818 AU; 0.75428 LD)	± 106 km (66 mi)	27–61	24.9	?
2025-10-29	2025-10-29; P07 Space Surveillance Telescope	2025 UB_{12}	218,588 km (135,824 mi; 0.00146117 AU; 0.56864 LD)	± 10,866 km (6,752 mi)	3.0–6.6	29.8	?
2025-10-29	2025-10-28; G96 Mt. Lemmon Survey	2025 UX_{7}	347,277 km (215,788 mi; 0.00232140 AU; 0.90342 LD)	± 1,043 km (648 mi)	4.9–11	28.6	?
2025-10-30	2025-10-31; G96 Mt. Lemmon Survey	2025 UX_{18}	47,070 km (29,250 mi; 0.0003146 AU; 0.1224 LD)	± 318 km (198 mi)	2.3–5.1	30.3	?
2025-10-30	2025-10-30; U68 JPL SynTrack Robotic Telescope	2025 UC_{11}	6,599 km (4,100 mi; 4.411×10^{−5} AU; 0.01717 LD)	± 1 km (0.62 mi)	0.41–0.93	34.0	?
2025-10-31	2025-11-02; T08 ATLAS-MLO, Mauna Loa	2025 VD	290,869 km (180,738 mi; 0.00194434 AU; 0.75668 LD)	± 501 km (311 mi)	13–30	26.5	?
2025-11-08	2025-11-07; F52 Pan-STARRS 2	2025 VN	36,092 km (22,427 mi; 0.00024126 AU; 0.09389 LD)	± 11 km (6.8 mi)	6.9–15	27.9	?
2025-11-09	2025-11-10; I41 Palomar Mountain--ZTF	2025 VA_{1}	284,260 km (176,630 mi; 0.0019002 AU; 0.7395 LD)	± 182 km (113 mi)	5.9–13	28.3	?
2025-11-11	2025-11-12; G96 Mt. Lemmon Survey	2025 VV_{4}	102,633 km (63,773 mi; 0.00068606 AU; 0.26699 LD)	± 338 km (210 mi)	3.1–6.9	29.7	?
2025-11-12	2025-11-12; K88 GINOP-KHK, Piszkesteto	2025 VL_{3}	122,082 km (75,858 mi; 0.00081607 AU; 0.31759 LD)	± 185 km (115 mi)	3.6–8.0	29.4	?
2025-11-12	2025-11-14; G96 Mt. Lemmon Survey	2025 VR_{4}	195,487 km (121,470 mi; 0.00130675 AU; 0.50855 LD)	± 594 km (369 mi)	2.3–5.2	30.3	?
2025-11-13	2025-11-14; W68 ATLAS Chile, Rio Hurtado	2025 VS_{3}	182,353 km (113,309 mi; 0.00121895 AU; 0.47438 LD)	± 176 km (109 mi)	8.2–18	27.6	?
2025-11-13	2025-11-12; 703 Catalina Sky Survey	2025 VT_{2}	220,533 km (137,033 mi; 0.00147417 AU; 0.57370 LD)	± 368 km (229 mi)	5.2–12	28.5	?
2025-11-13	2025-11-14; 703 Catalina Sky Survey	2025 VV_{3}	77,097 km (47,906 mi; 0.00051536 AU; 0.20056 LD)	± 125 km (78 mi)	5.3–12	28.5	?
2025-11-14	2025-11-12; G96 Mt. Lemmon Survey	2025 VS_{2}	339,033 km (210,665 mi; 0.00226630 AU; 0.88197 LD)	± 507 km (315 mi)	2.8–6.2	29.9	?
2025-11-17	2025-11-16; F52 Pan-STARRS 2	2025 WC	102,598 km (63,751 mi; 0.00068583 AU; 0.26690 LD)	± 53 km (33 mi)	3.4–7.6	29.5	?
2025-11-22	2025-11-23; U68 JPL SynTrack Robotic Telescope	2025 WO_{1}	364,220 km (226,320 mi; 0.0024347 AU; 0.9475 LD)	± 641 km (398 mi)	6.0–13	28.2	?
2025-11-22	2025-11-23; U68 JPL SynTrack Robotic Telescope	2025 WR_{1}	89,300 km (55,500 mi; 0.000597 AU; 0.232 LD)	± 180 km (110 mi)	3.3–7.4	29.5	?
2025-11-23	2025-11-26; G96 Mt. Lemmon Survey	2025 WB_{5}	147,015 km (91,351 mi; 0.00098273 AU; 0.38245 LD)	± 201 km (125 mi)	5.9–13	28.3	?
2025-11-24	2025-11-25; U68 JPL SynTrack Robotic Telescope	2025 WM_{20}	164,083 km (101,956 mi; 0.00109683 AU; 0.42685 LD)	± 707 km (439 mi)	4.2–9.3	29.0	?
2025-11-25	2025-11-25; 703 Catalina Sky Survey	2025 WW_{3}	161,705 km (100,479 mi; 0.00108093 AU; 0.42067 LD)	± 101 km (63 mi)	4.4–9.9	28.9	?
2025-11-26	2025-11-27; 703 Catalina Sky Survey	2025 WR_{7}	36,276 km (22,541 mi; 0.00024249 AU; 0.09437 LD)	± 60 km (37 mi)	2.9–6.6	29.8	?
2025-11-26	2025-11-24; F52 Pan-STARRS 2	2025 WK_{3}	113,654 km (70,621 mi; 0.00075973 AU; 0.29566 LD)	± 123 km (76 mi)	3.3–7.3	29.5	?
2025-11-26	2025-11-29; G96 Mt. Lemmon Survey	2025 WQ_{10}	330,564 km (205,403 mi; 0.00220968 AU; 0.85994 LD)	± 764 km (475 mi)	4.6–10	28.8	?
2025-11-27	2025-11-28; 703 Catalina Sky Survey	2025 WV_{13}	24,425 km (15,177 mi; 0.00016327 AU; 0.06354 LD)	± 39 km (24 mi)	4.5–10	28.9	?
2025-11-28	2025-11-28; 703 Catalina Sky Survey	2025 WK_{16}	202,379 km (125,752 mi; 0.00135282 AU; 0.52648 LD)	± 337 km (209 mi)	4.9–11	28.7	?
2025-11-29	2025-11-28; G96 Mt. Lemmon Survey	2025 WO_{8}	108,701 km (67,544 mi; 0.00072662 AU; 0.28278 LD)	± 59 km (37 mi)	3.7–8.2	29.3	?
2025-11-29	2025-11-30; G96 Mt. Lemmon Survey	2025 WE_{14}	28,027 km (17,415 mi; 0.00018735 AU; 0.07291 LD)	± 57 km (35 mi)	3.4–7.5	29.5	?
2025-11-30	2025-11-25; F52 Pan-STARRS 2	2025 WM_{4}	271,146 km (168,482 mi; 0.00181250 AU; 0.70537 LD)	± 370 km (230 mi)	12–28	26.6	?
2025-12-05	2025-12-08; 703 Catalina Sky Survey	2025 XR	217,915 km (135,406 mi; 0.00145667 AU; 0.56689 LD)	± 437 km (272 mi)	28–63	24.9	?
2025-12-07	2025-12-08; I41 Palomar Mountain--ZTF	2025 XQ	211,224 km (131,249 mi; 0.00141195 AU; 0.54949 LD)	± 191 km (119 mi)	4.0–8.9	29.1	?
2025-12-07	2025-12-08; U68 JPL SynTrack Robotic Telescope	2025 XN	250,692 km (155,773 mi; 0.00167577 AU; 0.65216 LD)	± 767 km (477 mi)	3.8–8.4	29.2	?
2025-12-08	2025-12-08; U68 JPL SynTrack Robotic Telescope	2025 XA_{1}	155,053 km (96,345 mi; 0.00103647 AU; 0.40336 LD)	± 146 km (91 mi)	2.7–6.1	30.0	?
2025-12-10	2025-12-11; U68 JPL SynTrack Robotic Telescope	2025 XL_{4}	313,562 km (194,838 mi; 0.00209603 AU; 0.81571 LD)	± 1,074 km (667 mi)	2.3–5.2	30.3	?
2025-12-10	2025-12-10; 703 Catalina Sky Survey	2025 XB_{1}	130,233 km (80,923 mi; 0.00087055 AU; 0.33879 LD)	± 180 km (110 mi)	4.5–10	28.8	?
2025-12-12	2025-12-13; U68 JPL SynTrack Robotic Telescope	2025 XZ_{3}	139,412 km (86,627 mi; 0.00093191 AU; 0.36267 LD)	± 215 km (134 mi)	4.6–10	28.8	?
2025-12-13	2025-12-08; T05 ATLAS-HKO, Haleakala	2025 XF_{1}	313,932 km (195,068 mi; 0.00209851 AU; 0.81667 LD)	± 7 km (4.3 mi)	6.6–15	28.0	?
2025-12-13	2025-12-14; 703 Catalina Sky Survey	2025 XZ_{4}	355,760 km (221,060 mi; 0.0023781 AU; 0.9255 LD)	± 440 km (270 mi)	8.3–19	27.5	?
2025-12-14	2025-12-13; U68 JPL SynTrack Robotic Telescope	2025 XW_{3}	198,672 km (123,449 mi; 0.00132804 AU; 0.51683 LD)	± 164 km (102 mi)	3.5–7.8	29.4	?
2025-12-16	2025-12-12; F52 Pan-STARRS 2	2025 XN_{4}	198,142 km (123,120 mi; 0.00132450 AU; 0.51545 LD)	± 88 km (55 mi)	9.1–20	27.3	?
2025-12-16	2025-12-17; U68 JPL SynTrack Robotic Telescope	2025 YR_{3}	170,599 km (106,005 mi; 0.00114038 AU; 0.44380 LD)	± 289 km (180 mi)	2.0–4.4	30.7	?
2025-12-18	2025-12-19; I41 Palomar Mountain--ZTF	2025 YE_{2}	91,236 km (56,691 mi; 0.00060987 AU; 0.23734 LD)	± 318 km (198 mi)	8.1–18	27.6	?
2025-12-19	2025-12-20; 703 Catalina Sky Survey	2025 YQ_{2}	260,954 km (162,149 mi; 0.00174437 AU; 0.67886 LD)	± 202 km (126 mi)	3.0–6.6	29.8	?
2025-12-20	2025-12-22; 703 Catalina Sky Survey	2025 YK_{4}	356,510 km (221,530 mi; 0.0023831 AU; 0.9274 LD)	± 595 km (370 mi)	18–39	25.9	?
2025-12-28	2025-12-28; T08 ATLAS-MLO, Mauna Loa	2025 YA_{8}	92,584 km (57,529 mi; 0.00061889 AU; 0.24085 LD)	± 88 km (55 mi)	4.5–10	28.8	?

=== Warning times by size ===
This sub-section visualises the warning times of the close approaches listed in the above table, depending on the size of the asteroid. The sizes of the charts show the relative sizes of the asteroids to scale. For comparison, the approximate size of a person is also shown. This is based the absolute magnitude of each asteroid, an approximate measure of size based on brightness.

Absolute magnitude H ≥ 30 (smallest)

Silhouette of man standing and facing forward

(size of a person for comparison)

Absolute magnitude 30 > H ≥ 29

Absolute magnitude 29 > H ≥ 28

Absolute magnitude 28 > H ≥ 27

Absolute magnitude 27 > H ≥ 26

Absolute magnitude 26 > H ≥ 25

Absolute magnitude 25 > H (largest)

- After closest approach: 2 (66.7%)
- < 24 hours before: 0 (0.0%)
- up to 7 days before: 1 (33.3%)
- > one week before: 0 (0.0%)
- > 7 weeks before: 0 (0.0%)
- > one year before: 0 (0.0%)

== Beyond 1 LD ==
Astronomers are also tracking close approaches of larger asteroids beyond one lunar distance, which provides them with an opportunity to study these objects with radar. Examples will be added below.

== See also ==
- List of asteroid close approaches to Earth
- List of asteroid close approaches to Earth in 2024
- Asteroid impact prediction
