= 2024 MK =

150m near-Earth object

- 2024 MK on 30 June 2024 by Goldstone Radar

Discovery
- Discovered by: ATLAS South Africa, Sutherland
- Discovery date: 16 June 2024

Designations
- Minor planet category: NEO; Apollo

Orbital characteristics
- Epoch 9 June 2026 (JD 2461200.5)
- Uncertainty parameter 0
- Observation arc: 3848 days (10.54 yr)
- Earliest precovery date: 29 March 2014
- Aphelion: 3.39974 AU (508,594,000 km)
- Perihelion: 1.00928 AU (150,986,000 km)
- Semi-major axis: 2.20451 AU (329,790,000 km)
- Orbital period (sidereal): 3.27 years
- Mean anomaly: 29.4026° (M)
- Mean motion: 0° 18^{m} 4.032^{s} / day
- Inclination: 8.38567°
- Longitude of ascending node: 277.785°
- Argument of perihelion: 14.885°
- Earth MOID: 0.00387506 AU (579,701 km)
- Mars MOID: 0.23272 AU
- Jupiter MOID: 1.82141 AU
- T_{Jupiter}: 3.44

Physical characteristics
- Mean diameter: ~150 m
- Apparent magnitude: 8.5 at close approach
- Absolute magnitude (H): 22.02

2024 MK is a S-type near-Earth object with a diameter of around 150 meters. It flew past Earth on 29 June 2024. It was discovered by ATLAS South Africa, Sutherland on 16 June 2024. This asteroid travels both in the main-belt and in the near-Earth region. It passed Earth on 29 June 2024 at a distance of 184,000 miles (295,000 kilometers). That distance is about 0.77 lunar distances (LD). The close approach with Earth changed 2024 MK's orbit, shortening its orbital period by about 24 days. Though Earth's gravity brought it nearer to Earth, the object poses no threat, and the next close approach it will make will be in 3037.

While it was not going to hit Earth, an asteroid of its size could cause considerable damage if it did hit Earth. 2024 MK's discovery just a bit before its close encounter with Earth highlights the ongoing need to improve the ability to detect potentially hazardous asteroids and near-Earth asteroids.

== Physical characteristics ==
Observations have shown that 2024 MK is compositionally most analogous to an ordinary L chondrite. There was also no detected surface deposits of water or hydroxide on 2024 MK.

Its close orbital flyby of Earth also did not affect its surface in any major way. If it had an effect on the asteroid, it was too little to be detected. If 2024 MK's surface had been significantly refreshed, it would be more similar to a Q-type asteroid. This means that multiple close planetary encounters are necessary to resurface an asteroid.

== See also ==
- (415029) 2011 UL21 – a near-Earth object that made a close approach on 27 June 2024
- 2024 ON – a near-Earth object that made a close approach on 17 September 2024
