= List of minor planets: 532001–533000 =

The following is a partial list of minor planets, running from minor-planet number 532001 through 533000, inclusive. The primary data for this and other partial lists is based on JPL's "Small-Body Orbital Elements" and data available from the Minor Planet Center. Critical list information is also provided by the MPC, unless otherwise specified from Lowell Observatory. A detailed description of the table's columns and additional sources are given on the main page including a complete list of every page in this series, and a statistical break-up on the dynamical classification of minor planets.

Also see the summary list of all named bodies in numerical and alphabetical order, and the corresponding naming citations for the number range of this particular list. New namings may only be added to this list after official publication, as the preannouncement of names is condemned by the Working Group for Small Bodies Nomenclature of the International Astronomical Union.

Near-Earth obj.	MBA (inner)	MBA (outer)	Centaur
Mars-crosser	MBA (middle)	Jupiter trojan	Trans-Neptunian obj.
Unclassified

== 532001–532100 ==
Designation			Discovery			Properties		Ref
Permanent	Provisional	Named after	Date	Site	Discoverer(s)	Category	Diam.	Ref
532001	2013 DD_{13}	—	January 19, 2013	Kitt Peak	Spacewatch	·	2.0 km	MPC · JPL
532002	2013 DQ_{16}	—	June 19, 2010	WISE	WISE	EUP	4.6 km	MPC · JPL
532003	2013 DL_{17}	—	March 6, 2013	Haleakala	Pan-STARRS 1	·	2.2 km	MPC · JPL
532004	2013 EA_{1}	—	April 10, 2010	Kitt Peak	Spacewatch	·	590 m	MPC · JPL
532005	2013 ED_{7}	—	September 9, 2010	Kitt Peak	Spacewatch	·	2.7 km	MPC · JPL
532006	2013 EJ_{7}	—	March 15, 2010	Kitt Peak	Spacewatch	·	450 m	MPC · JPL
532007	2013 EJ_{13}	—	February 14, 2013	Haleakala	Pan-STARRS 1	·	1.8 km	MPC · JPL
532008	2013 EK_{14}	—	October 9, 2008	Mount Lemmon	Mount Lemmon Survey	·	630 m	MPC · JPL
532009	2013 EX_{16}	—	October 24, 2011	Haleakala	Pan-STARRS 1	·	1.9 km	MPC · JPL
532010	2013 EX_{32}	—	February 10, 2002	Socorro	LINEAR	·	3.1 km	MPC · JPL
532011	2013 EZ_{32}	—	January 27, 2007	Mount Lemmon	Mount Lemmon Survey	T_{j} (2.99)	3.1 km	MPC · JPL
532012	2013 EZ_{35}	—	October 27, 2005	Mount Lemmon	Mount Lemmon Survey	·	2.7 km	MPC · JPL
532013	2013 ET_{52}	—	April 26, 2008	Mount Lemmon	Mount Lemmon Survey	THM	2.0 km	MPC · JPL
532014	2013 EL_{61}	—	August 24, 2000	Socorro	LINEAR	·	1.1 km	MPC · JPL
532015	2013 EC_{70}	—	April 14, 2008	Mount Lemmon	Mount Lemmon Survey	·	2.0 km	MPC · JPL
532016	2013 EQ_{81}	—	September 23, 2011	Haleakala	Pan-STARRS 1	(1338) (FLO)	740 m	MPC · JPL
532017	2013 EE_{82}	—	March 8, 2013	Haleakala	Pan-STARRS 1	EOS	1.5 km	MPC · JPL
532018	2013 EZ_{86}	—	October 25, 2011	Haleakala	Pan-STARRS 1	V	790 m	MPC · JPL
532019	2013 EX_{91}	—	October 23, 2011	Mount Lemmon	Mount Lemmon Survey	(2076)	940 m	MPC · JPL
532020	2013 ES_{94}	—	March 8, 2013	Haleakala	Pan-STARRS 1	VER	2.2 km	MPC · JPL
532021	2013 EF_{103}	—	January 20, 2013	Kitt Peak	Spacewatch	TIR	2.0 km	MPC · JPL
532022	2013 ER_{108}	—	March 5, 2013	Haleakala	Pan-STARRS 1	·	810 m	MPC · JPL
532023	2013 EO_{109}	—	March 20, 2002	Kitt Peak	Spacewatch	·	2.2 km	MPC · JPL
532024	2013 EM_{118}	—	January 28, 2007	Kitt Peak	Spacewatch	·	2.2 km	MPC · JPL
532025	2013 EU_{121}	—	January 19, 2013	Mount Lemmon	Mount Lemmon Survey	THM	2.4 km	MPC · JPL
532026	2013 EC_{138}	—	March 13, 2013	Kitt Peak	Research and Education Collaborative Occultation Network	cubewano (hot)	293 km	MPC · JPL
532027	2013 EH_{154}	—	March 4, 2013	Haleakala	Pan-STARRS 1	centaur	144 km	MPC · JPL
532028	2013 EL_{155}	—	February 10, 2007	Mount Lemmon	Mount Lemmon Survey	·	2.4 km	MPC · JPL
532029	2013 EV_{157}	—	March 7, 2013	Kitt Peak	Spacewatch	V	540 m	MPC · JPL
532030	2013 EG_{158}	—	March 13, 2013	Catalina	CSS	·	3.0 km	MPC · JPL
532031	2013 EJ_{158}	—	February 9, 2007	Kitt Peak	Spacewatch	VER	2.7 km	MPC · JPL
532032	2013 EP_{158}	—	March 6, 2013	Haleakala	Pan-STARRS 1	(2076)	830 m	MPC · JPL
532033	2013 FX_{10}	—	October 9, 2007	Kitt Peak	Spacewatch	PHO	900 m	MPC · JPL
532034	2013 FH_{11}	—	February 25, 2006	Kitt Peak	Spacewatch	·	700 m	MPC · JPL
532035	2013 FK_{14}	—	March 14, 2013	Catalina	CSS	·	980 m	MPC · JPL
532036	2013 FW_{25}	—	September 24, 2011	Haleakala	Pan-STARRS 1	·	850 m	MPC · JPL
532037 Chiminigagua	2013 FY_{27}	Chiminigagua	March 17, 2013	Cerro Tololo-DECam	S. S. Sheppard, C. A. Trujillo	SDO · moon	742 km	MPC · JPL
532038	2013 FB_{28}	—	March 17, 2013	Cerro Tololo-DECam	S. S. Sheppard, C. A. Trujillo	cubewano (hot)	289 km	MPC · JPL
532039	2013 FR_{28}	—	March 19, 2013	Haleakala	Pan-STARRS 1	res · 4:7	123 km	MPC · JPL
532040	2013 GB_{2}	—	March 13, 2013	Haleakala	Pan-STARRS 1	·	740 m	MPC · JPL
532041	2013 GT_{2}	—	November 30, 2008	Mount Lemmon	Mount Lemmon Survey	·	750 m	MPC · JPL
532042	2013 GE_{3}	—	February 15, 2013	Haleakala	Pan-STARRS 1	·	3.4 km	MPC · JPL
532043	2013 GS_{6}	—	March 8, 2013	Haleakala	Pan-STARRS 1	·	4.2 km	MPC · JPL
532044	2013 GY_{9}	—	March 18, 2013	Kitt Peak	Spacewatch	NYS	1.1 km	MPC · JPL
532045	2013 GZ_{12}	—	November 1, 2005	Kitt Peak	Spacewatch	THB	2.3 km	MPC · JPL
532046	2013 GS_{13}	—	April 15, 1996	Kitt Peak	Spacewatch	T_{j} (2.99)	3.1 km	MPC · JPL
532047	2013 GW_{16}	—	February 23, 2007	Kitt Peak	Spacewatch	·	2.7 km	MPC · JPL
532048	2013 GD_{19}	—	March 8, 2013	Haleakala	Pan-STARRS 1	·	2.6 km	MPC · JPL
532049	2013 GY_{28}	—	September 4, 2011	Haleakala	Pan-STARRS 1	·	740 m	MPC · JPL
532050	2013 GO_{29}	—	September 30, 2011	Kitt Peak	Spacewatch	·	870 m	MPC · JPL
532051	2013 GD_{33}	—	March 18, 2013	Kitt Peak	Spacewatch	·	900 m	MPC · JPL
532052	2013 GZ_{37}	—	October 9, 2007	Mount Lemmon	Mount Lemmon Survey	·	630 m	MPC · JPL
532053	2013 GP_{46}	—	February 8, 2007	Mount Lemmon	Mount Lemmon Survey	T_{j} (2.98)	3.2 km	MPC · JPL
532054	2013 GS_{54}	—	April 10, 2013	Haleakala	Pan-STARRS 1	PHO	830 m	MPC · JPL
532055	2013 GQ_{60}	—	March 9, 2007	Mount Lemmon	Mount Lemmon Survey	THM	1.8 km	MPC · JPL
532056	2013 GU_{63}	—	April 9, 2013	Haleakala	Pan-STARRS 1	·	980 m	MPC · JPL
532057	2013 GR_{68}	—	March 17, 2013	Mount Lemmon	Mount Lemmon Survey	·	970 m	MPC · JPL
532058	2013 GU_{68}	—	April 10, 2013	Haleakala	Pan-STARRS 1	AMO	450 m	MPC · JPL
532059	2013 GS_{70}	—	February 1, 2009	Mount Lemmon	Mount Lemmon Survey	NYS	1.2 km	MPC · JPL
532060	2013 GQ_{74}	—	March 31, 2013	Mount Lemmon	Mount Lemmon Survey	·	620 m	MPC · JPL
532061	2013 GS_{78}	—	April 12, 2013	Haleakala	Pan-STARRS 1	MAR	930 m	MPC · JPL
532062	2013 GD_{84}	—	April 2, 2006	Kitt Peak	Spacewatch	·	660 m	MPC · JPL
532063	2013 GH_{86}	—	August 25, 2005	Palomar	NEAT	·	1.9 km	MPC · JPL
532064	2013 GS_{141}	—	April 10, 2013	Haleakala	Pan-STARRS 1	·	610 m	MPC · JPL
532065	2013 HW_{1}	—	April 11, 2013	Mount Lemmon	Mount Lemmon Survey	·	980 m	MPC · JPL
532066	2013 HJ_{11}	—	March 14, 2013	Kitt Peak	Spacewatch	·	1.4 km	MPC · JPL
532067	2013 HR_{13}	—	March 15, 2013	Kitt Peak	Spacewatch	·	630 m	MPC · JPL
532068	2013 HU_{13}	—	October 24, 2011	Haleakala	Pan-STARRS 1	·	1.0 km	MPC · JPL
532069	2013 HO_{17}	—	April 3, 2013	Mount Lemmon	Mount Lemmon Survey	(895)	3.2 km	MPC · JPL
532070	2013 HJ_{20}	—	December 27, 2006	Catalina	CSS	T_{j} (2.99) · EUP	3.2 km	MPC · JPL
532071	2013 HZ_{24}	—	February 27, 2009	Kitt Peak	Spacewatch	NYS	1.1 km	MPC · JPL
532072	2013 HY_{34}	—	November 25, 2011	Haleakala	Pan-STARRS 1	·	1.1 km	MPC · JPL
532073	2013 HU_{36}	—	December 19, 2004	Mount Lemmon	Mount Lemmon Survey	·	1.1 km	MPC · JPL
532074	2013 HG_{39}	—	November 30, 2008	Kitt Peak	Spacewatch	·	430 m	MPC · JPL
532075	2013 HM_{44}	—	December 16, 2007	Kitt Peak	Spacewatch	·	1.1 km	MPC · JPL
532076	2013 HA_{45}	—	September 27, 2003	Kitt Peak	Spacewatch	·	1.0 km	MPC · JPL
532077	2013 HB_{46}	—	April 9, 2013	Haleakala	Pan-STARRS 1	·	600 m	MPC · JPL
532078	2013 HX_{52}	—	April 9, 2013	Haleakala	Pan-STARRS 1	·	2.6 km	MPC · JPL
532079	2013 HG_{53}	—	March 22, 2009	Mount Lemmon	Mount Lemmon Survey	·	930 m	MPC · JPL
532080	2013 HX_{62}	—	April 3, 2013	Mount Lemmon	Mount Lemmon Survey	·	640 m	MPC · JPL
532081	2013 HZ_{67}	—	April 9, 2013	Haleakala	Pan-STARRS 1	·	450 m	MPC · JPL
532082	2013 HC_{69}	—	October 25, 2011	Haleakala	Pan-STARRS 1	·	960 m	MPC · JPL
532083	2013 HQ_{70}	—	March 2, 2006	Kitt Peak	Spacewatch	·	400 m	MPC · JPL
532084	2013 HP_{74}	—	October 10, 2004	Kitt Peak	Spacewatch	·	550 m	MPC · JPL
532085	2013 HS_{77}	—	May 4, 2013	Haleakala	Pan-STARRS 1	·	1.4 km	MPC · JPL
532086	2013 HZ_{95}	—	April 10, 2013	Haleakala	Pan-STARRS 1	·	610 m	MPC · JPL
532087	2013 HC_{111}	—	January 23, 2006	Kitt Peak	Spacewatch	·	500 m	MPC · JPL
532088	2013 HF_{120}	—	April 10, 2013	Haleakala	Pan-STARRS 1	·	1.1 km	MPC · JPL
532089	2013 HK_{120}	—	October 4, 2007	Mount Lemmon	Mount Lemmon Survey	·	650 m	MPC · JPL
532090	2013 HD_{138}	—	September 18, 2003	Kitt Peak	Spacewatch	NYS	850 m	MPC · JPL
532091	2013 HM_{143}	—	October 7, 2004	Kitt Peak	Spacewatch	·	570 m	MPC · JPL
532092	2013 HU_{156}	—	April 19, 2013	Haleakala	Pan-STARRS 1	plutino	395 km	MPC · JPL
532093	2013 HV_{156}	—	April 19, 2013	Haleakala	Pan-STARRS 1	cubewano (hot)	425 km	MPC · JPL
532094	2013 HX_{156}	—	April 17, 2013	Haleakala	Pan-STARRS 1	centaur	131 km	MPC · JPL
532095	2013 HY_{156}	—	April 17, 2013	Haleakala	Pan-STARRS 1	cubewano (hot)	199 km	MPC · JPL
532096	2013 HC_{157}	—	March 19, 2009	Mount Lemmon	Mount Lemmon Survey	·	1.1 km	MPC · JPL
532097	2013 HG_{157}	—	April 21, 2013	Haleakala	Pan-STARRS 1	EUN	1.1 km	MPC · JPL
532098	2013 HK_{157}	—	October 21, 2007	Mount Lemmon	Mount Lemmon Survey	·	1.2 km	MPC · JPL
532099	2013 HK_{158}	—	April 19, 2013	Haleakala	Pan-STARRS 1	·	660 m	MPC · JPL
532100	2013 JJ_{4}	—	April 12, 2013	Haleakala	Pan-STARRS 1	·	1.2 km	MPC · JPL

== 532101–532200 ==
back to top

Designation			Discovery			Properties		Ref
Permanent	Provisional	Named after	Date	Site	Discoverer(s)	Category	Diam.	Ref
532101	2013 JE_{8}	—	November 25, 2011	Haleakala	Pan-STARRS 1	·	1.1 km	MPC · JPL
532102	2013 JD_{16}	—	May 8, 2013	Haleakala	Pan-STARRS 1	PHO	1 km	MPC · JPL
532103	2013 JR_{30}	—	June 1, 2010	WISE	WISE	PHO	1.9 km	MPC · JPL
532104	2013 JO_{32}	—	June 12, 2009	Kitt Peak	Spacewatch	·	1.0 km	MPC · JPL
532105	2013 JV_{49}	—	May 25, 2007	Mount Lemmon	Mount Lemmon Survey	CYB	2.1 km	MPC · JPL
532106	2013 JL_{51}	—	October 22, 2011	Kitt Peak	Spacewatch	PHO	840 m	MPC · JPL
532107	2013 JB_{63}	—	April 15, 2013	Haleakala	Pan-STARRS 1	V	700 m	MPC · JPL
532108	2013 JB_{66}	—	May 15, 2013	Haleakala	Pan-STARRS 1	·	990 m	MPC · JPL
532109	2013 JO_{66}	—	February 12, 2008	Mount Lemmon	Mount Lemmon Survey	EUN	1.1 km	MPC · JPL
532110	2013 JK_{67}	—	May 15, 2013	Haleakala	Pan-STARRS 1	·	920 m	MPC · JPL
532111	2013 KN_{11}	—	April 23, 2013	Mount Lemmon	Mount Lemmon Survey	PHO	1.1 km	MPC · JPL
532112	2013 LW_{1}	—	June 26, 2011	Socorro	LINEAR	·	610 m	MPC · JPL
532113	2013 LP_{2}	—	October 1, 2005	Kitt Peak	Spacewatch	JUN	1.0 km	MPC · JPL
532114	2013 LV_{5}	—	May 8, 2013	Haleakala	Pan-STARRS 1	·	1.0 km	MPC · JPL
532115	2013 LU_{8}	—	January 14, 2012	Mount Lemmon	Mount Lemmon Survey	PHO	880 m	MPC · JPL
532116	2013 LX_{11}	—	May 16, 2013	Haleakala	Pan-STARRS 1	·	750 m	MPC · JPL
532117	2013 LZ_{11}	—	May 10, 2013	Kitt Peak	Spacewatch	JUN	780 m	MPC · JPL
532118	2013 LA_{12}	—	May 15, 2013	Haleakala	Pan-STARRS 1	·	1.3 km	MPC · JPL
532119	2013 LN_{14}	—	June 5, 2013	Mount Lemmon	Mount Lemmon Survey	PHO	860 m	MPC · JPL
532120	2013 LR_{26}	—	May 20, 2013	Haleakala	Pan-STARRS 1	JUN	1.2 km	MPC · JPL
532121	2013 LE_{36}	—	June 1, 2013	Mount Lemmon	Mount Lemmon Survey	·	1.5 km	MPC · JPL
532122	2013 LG_{36}	—	August 7, 2004	Campo Imperatore	CINEOS	GEF	1.3 km	MPC · JPL
532123	2013 LK_{36}	—	June 7, 2013	Mount Lemmon	Mount Lemmon Survey	EUN	1.0 km	MPC · JPL
532124	2013 LR_{36}	—	April 28, 2012	Mount Lemmon	Mount Lemmon Survey	·	1.7 km	MPC · JPL
532125	2013 LW_{36}	—	June 11, 2013	Mount Lemmon	Mount Lemmon Survey	·	620 m	MPC · JPL
532126	2013 MM	—	September 7, 2004	Palomar	NEAT	·	2.9 km	MPC · JPL
532127	2013 ML_{4}	—	December 17, 2009	Mount Lemmon	Mount Lemmon Survey	·	1.8 km	MPC · JPL
532128	2013 MJ_{5}	—	June 19, 2013	Mount Lemmon	Mount Lemmon Survey	DOR	2.3 km	MPC · JPL
532129	2013 MT_{5}	—	February 23, 2012	Catalina	CSS	·	2.0 km	MPC · JPL
532130	2013 MY_{8}	—	May 20, 2013	Haleakala	Pan-STARRS 1	·	1.8 km	MPC · JPL
532131	2013 MP_{9}	—	October 5, 2005	Mount Lemmon	Mount Lemmon Survey	·	1.1 km	MPC · JPL
532132	2013 MC_{11}	—	December 1, 2010	Mount Lemmon	Mount Lemmon Survey	·	1.0 km	MPC · JPL
532133	2013 MD_{11}	—	March 3, 2009	Kitt Peak	Spacewatch	·	780 m	MPC · JPL
532134	2013 MN_{12}	—	June 20, 2013	Haleakala	Pan-STARRS 1	·	1.3 km	MPC · JPL
532135	2013 MR_{12}	—	January 12, 2011	Mount Lemmon	Mount Lemmon Survey	·	1.5 km	MPC · JPL
532136	2013 MC_{13}	—	February 16, 2012	Haleakala	Pan-STARRS 1	·	990 m	MPC · JPL
532137	2013 ML_{13}	—	February 27, 2012	Haleakala	Pan-STARRS 1	·	1.1 km	MPC · JPL
532138	2013 MM_{13}	—	December 10, 2010	Mount Lemmon	Mount Lemmon Survey	V	610 m	MPC · JPL
532139	2013 MN_{13}	—	January 30, 2011	Haleakala	Pan-STARRS 1	DOR	2.0 km	MPC · JPL
532140	2013 MT_{13}	—	March 11, 2008	Kitt Peak	Spacewatch	·	1.1 km	MPC · JPL
532141	2013 MX_{13}	—	June 18, 2013	Haleakala	Pan-STARRS 1	·	650 m	MPC · JPL
532142	2013 MY_{13}	—	June 19, 2013	Mount Lemmon	Mount Lemmon Survey	·	1.6 km	MPC · JPL
532143	2013 MB_{14}	—	June 16, 2013	Haleakala	Pan-STARRS 1	·	770 m	MPC · JPL
532144	2013 MD_{14}	—	June 30, 2013	Haleakala	Pan-STARRS 1	·	660 m	MPC · JPL
532145	2013 NH_{8}	—	July 3, 2013	Haleakala	Pan-STARRS 1	·	1.6 km	MPC · JPL
532146	2013 NC_{25}	—	August 25, 1995	Kitt Peak	Spacewatch	·	1.7 km	MPC · JPL
532147	2013 NE_{25}	—	February 9, 2005	Mount Lemmon	Mount Lemmon Survey	·	730 m	MPC · JPL
532148	2013 NH_{25}	—	July 1, 2013	Haleakala	Pan-STARRS 1	·	1.1 km	MPC · JPL
532149	2013 NV_{25}	—	July 14, 2013	Haleakala	Pan-STARRS 1	·	2.3 km	MPC · JPL
532150	2013 NX_{25}	—	March 5, 2011	Mount Lemmon	Mount Lemmon Survey	·	1.2 km	MPC · JPL
532151	2013 ND_{26}	—	July 15, 2013	Haleakala	Pan-STARRS 1	·	580 m	MPC · JPL
532152	2013 NF_{26}	—	November 4, 2005	Mount Lemmon	Mount Lemmon Survey	·	1.7 km	MPC · JPL
532153	2013 NJ_{26}	—	February 29, 2008	Kitt Peak	Spacewatch	EUN	1.0 km	MPC · JPL
532154	2013 NC_{27}	—	September 22, 2009	Catalina	CSS	·	2.0 km	MPC · JPL
532155	2013 NR_{27}	—	September 13, 2005	Kitt Peak	Spacewatch	·	1.3 km	MPC · JPL
532156	2013 NS_{27}	—	April 20, 2012	Mount Lemmon	Mount Lemmon Survey	·	2.3 km	MPC · JPL
532157	2013 NT_{27}	—	September 13, 2005	Kitt Peak	Spacewatch	·	1.1 km	MPC · JPL
532158	2013 NW_{27}	—	November 4, 2005	Kitt Peak	Spacewatch	·	1.4 km	MPC · JPL
532159	2013 NX_{27}	—	September 18, 2010	Mount Lemmon	Mount Lemmon Survey	·	640 m	MPC · JPL
532160	2013 NK_{28}	—	July 1, 2013	Haleakala	Pan-STARRS 1	·	1.5 km	MPC · JPL
532161	2013 NQ_{28}	—	July 2, 2013	Haleakala	Pan-STARRS 1	·	1.7 km	MPC · JPL
532162	2013 NR_{28}	—	July 2, 2013	Haleakala	Pan-STARRS 1	EUN	1.2 km	MPC · JPL
532163	2013 NO_{29}	—	July 14, 2013	Haleakala	Pan-STARRS 1	·	920 m	MPC · JPL
532164	2013 NR_{29}	—	January 8, 2011	Mount Lemmon	Mount Lemmon Survey	·	1.1 km	MPC · JPL
532165	2013 NG_{30}	—	January 26, 2011	Mount Lemmon	Mount Lemmon Survey	·	1.0 km	MPC · JPL
532166	2013 NR_{30}	—	March 14, 2007	Kitt Peak	Spacewatch	·	1.6 km	MPC · JPL
532167	2013 NT_{30}	—	March 15, 2012	Mount Lemmon	Mount Lemmon Survey	·	760 m	MPC · JPL
532168	2013 NA_{31}	—	February 7, 2007	Kitt Peak	Spacewatch	·	2.1 km	MPC · JPL
532169	2013 NN_{31}	—	September 30, 2009	Mount Lemmon	Mount Lemmon Survey	·	1.3 km	MPC · JPL
532170	2013 NA_{32}	—	August 27, 2009	Kitt Peak	Spacewatch	·	1.2 km	MPC · JPL
532171	2013 NB_{32}	—	July 15, 2013	Haleakala	Pan-STARRS 1	·	1.4 km	MPC · JPL
532172	2013 NK_{32}	—	October 11, 2005	Kitt Peak	Spacewatch	·	1.1 km	MPC · JPL
532173	2013 NQ_{32}	—	February 21, 2007	Kitt Peak	Spacewatch	·	1.3 km	MPC · JPL
532174	2013 NA_{33}	—	January 27, 2007	Kitt Peak	Spacewatch	·	1.1 km	MPC · JPL
532175	2013 NK_{33}	—	July 1, 2013	Haleakala	Pan-STARRS 1	·	2.5 km	MPC · JPL
532176	2013 NL_{33}	—	November 19, 2006	Catalina	CSS	·	1.4 km	MPC · JPL
532177	2013 NR_{33}	—	November 25, 2006	Kitt Peak	Spacewatch	NYS	1.1 km	MPC · JPL
532178	2013 NS_{33}	—	February 28, 2009	Kitt Peak	Spacewatch	·	600 m	MPC · JPL
532179	2013 OL_{3}	—	June 15, 2004	Socorro	LINEAR	·	1.8 km	MPC · JPL
532180	2013 OQ_{4}	—	July 14, 2013	Haleakala	Pan-STARRS 1	·	1.8 km	MPC · JPL
532181	2013 OW_{5}	—	September 10, 2010	Mount Lemmon	Mount Lemmon Survey	·	640 m	MPC · JPL
532182	2013 OT_{7}	—	September 21, 2003	Anderson Mesa	LONEOS	·	1.5 km	MPC · JPL
532183	2013 OO_{8}	—	October 2, 2009	Mount Lemmon	Mount Lemmon Survey	·	2.0 km	MPC · JPL
532184	2013 OR_{11}	—	July 20, 2013	Haleakala	Pan-STARRS 1	centaur	193 km	MPC · JPL
532185	2013 OD_{12}	—	April 30, 2008	Mount Lemmon	Mount Lemmon Survey	BRA	1.5 km	MPC · JPL
532186	2013 PB	—	September 12, 2004	Socorro	LINEAR	·	1.7 km	MPC · JPL
532187	2013 PG	—	September 11, 2004	Socorro	LINEAR	526	2.4 km	MPC · JPL
532188	2013 PD_{2}	—	August 7, 2008	Kitt Peak	Spacewatch	·	1.6 km	MPC · JPL
532189	2013 PJ_{2}	—	August 15, 2009	Kitt Peak	Spacewatch	BAR	980 m	MPC · JPL
532190	2013 PK_{4}	—	September 28, 2000	Socorro	LINEAR	JUN	1.1 km	MPC · JPL
532191	2013 PO_{4}	—	November 4, 2007	Kitt Peak	Spacewatch	·	800 m	MPC · JPL
532192	2013 PJ_{7}	—	February 8, 2011	Mount Lemmon	Mount Lemmon Survey	·	1.6 km	MPC · JPL
532193	2013 PM_{7}	—	August 2, 2013	Črni Vrh	Vales, J.	·	1.7 km	MPC · JPL
532194	2013 PX_{13}	—	June 20, 2013	Catalina	CSS	PAL	1.9 km	MPC · JPL
532195	2013 PL_{16}	—	January 14, 2011	Mount Lemmon	Mount Lemmon Survey	·	1.7 km	MPC · JPL
532196	2013 PA_{17}	—	July 15, 2013	Haleakala	Pan-STARRS 1	·	1.6 km	MPC · JPL
532197	2013 PS_{17}	—	July 14, 2013	Haleakala	Pan-STARRS 1	·	720 m	MPC · JPL
532198	2013 PN_{18}	—	February 28, 2012	Haleakala	Pan-STARRS 1	·	1.6 km	MPC · JPL
532199	2013 PT_{19}	—	February 5, 2010	WISE	WISE	·	1.5 km	MPC · JPL
532200	2013 PX_{19}	—	March 13, 2012	Mount Lemmon	Mount Lemmon Survey	·	620 m	MPC · JPL

== 532201–532300 ==
back to top

Designation			Discovery			Properties		Ref
Permanent	Provisional	Named after	Date	Site	Discoverer(s)	Category	Diam.	Ref
532201	2013 PY_{21}	—	August 8, 2013	Kitt Peak	Spacewatch	·	670 m	MPC · JPL
532202	2013 PJ_{23}	—	December 27, 2009	Kitt Peak	Spacewatch	·	1.3 km	MPC · JPL
532203	2013 PO_{24}	—	December 16, 2009	Mount Lemmon	Mount Lemmon Survey	·	2.4 km	MPC · JPL
532204	2013 PU_{28}	—	October 11, 2010	Mount Lemmon	Mount Lemmon Survey	·	500 m	MPC · JPL
532205	2013 PS_{30}	—	August 9, 2013	Haleakala	Pan-STARRS 1	·	1.3 km	MPC · JPL
532206	2013 PT_{30}	—	August 9, 2013	Haleakala	Pan-STARRS 1	EUN	860 m	MPC · JPL
532207	2013 PF_{32}	—	January 26, 2010	WISE	WISE	·	1.9 km	MPC · JPL
532208	2013 PP_{32}	—	August 7, 2013	Kitt Peak	Spacewatch	·	1.9 km	MPC · JPL
532209	2013 PQ_{33}	—	August 7, 2013	Kitt Peak	Spacewatch	·	1.4 km	MPC · JPL
532210	2013 PT_{34}	—	June 20, 2013	Haleakala	Pan-STARRS 1	·	530 m	MPC · JPL
532211	2013 PE_{36}	—	August 9, 2013	Haleakala	Pan-STARRS 1	slow	1.8 km	MPC · JPL
532212	2013 PB_{37}	—	June 20, 2013	Haleakala	Pan-STARRS 1	GEF	940 m	MPC · JPL
532213	2013 PE_{37}	—	June 20, 2013	Haleakala	Pan-STARRS 1	·	1.5 km	MPC · JPL
532214	2013 PF_{37}	—	March 1, 2011	Mount Lemmon	Mount Lemmon Survey	·	1.8 km	MPC · JPL
532215	2013 PM_{38}	—	September 30, 2009	Mount Lemmon	Mount Lemmon Survey	EUN	1.1 km	MPC · JPL
532216	2013 PX_{38}	—	July 15, 2013	Haleakala	Pan-STARRS 1	H	330 m	MPC · JPL
532217	2013 PH_{39}	—	November 14, 2007	Kitt Peak	Spacewatch	·	620 m	MPC · JPL
532218	2013 PX_{42}	—	October 23, 2009	Mount Lemmon	Mount Lemmon Survey	·	1.5 km	MPC · JPL
532219	2013 PQ_{43}	—	September 7, 1999	Socorro	LINEAR	·	1.7 km	MPC · JPL
532220	2013 PH_{48}	—	May 22, 2003	Kitt Peak	Spacewatch	·	520 m	MPC · JPL
532221	2013 PT_{48}	—	February 27, 2012	Haleakala	Pan-STARRS 1	·	1.4 km	MPC · JPL
532222	2013 PX_{51}	—	April 15, 2012	Haleakala	Pan-STARRS 1	·	2.0 km	MPC · JPL
532223	2013 PZ_{53}	—	October 17, 2010	Mount Lemmon	Mount Lemmon Survey	·	540 m	MPC · JPL
532224	2013 PF_{54}	—	April 20, 2009	Mount Lemmon	Mount Lemmon Survey	·	640 m	MPC · JPL
532225	2013 PR_{55}	—	February 23, 2007	Mount Lemmon	Mount Lemmon Survey	·	1.1 km	MPC · JPL
532226	2013 PH_{57}	—	August 21, 2000	Anderson Mesa	LONEOS	JUN	1.0 km	MPC · JPL
532227	2013 PL_{57}	—	November 21, 2009	Catalina	CSS	·	1.3 km	MPC · JPL
532228	2013 PH_{60}	—	June 20, 2013	Haleakala	Pan-STARRS 1	·	1.3 km	MPC · JPL
532229	2013 PV_{60}	—	January 22, 2006	Mount Lemmon	Mount Lemmon Survey	·	1.7 km	MPC · JPL
532230	2013 PY_{64}	—	September 10, 2004	Kitt Peak	Spacewatch	·	1.4 km	MPC · JPL
532231	2013 PV_{65}	—	November 1, 2005	Kitt Peak	Spacewatch	·	1.1 km	MPC · JPL
532232	2013 PO_{68}	—	February 20, 2009	Kitt Peak	Spacewatch	·	610 m	MPC · JPL
532233	2013 PT_{69}	—	September 12, 2007	Mount Lemmon	Mount Lemmon Survey	·	620 m	MPC · JPL
532234	2013 PD_{72}	—	June 11, 2013	Mount Lemmon	Mount Lemmon Survey	·	1.6 km	MPC · JPL
532235	2013 PT_{73}	—	February 25, 2011	Mount Lemmon	Mount Lemmon Survey	AGN	1.4 km	MPC · JPL
532236	2013 PC_{76}	—	October 23, 2005	Catalina	CSS	KON	2.0 km	MPC · JPL
532237	2013 PG_{76}	—	February 13, 2011	Mount Lemmon	Mount Lemmon Survey	·	1.1 km	MPC · JPL
532238	2013 PJ_{76}	—	December 1, 2005	Catalina	CSS	·	1.4 km	MPC · JPL
532239	2013 PK_{76}	—	January 23, 2006	Mount Lemmon	Mount Lemmon Survey	·	1.7 km	MPC · JPL
532240	2013 PL_{76}	—	February 8, 2011	Mount Lemmon	Mount Lemmon Survey	·	2.0 km	MPC · JPL
532241	2013 PN_{76}	—	August 12, 2013	Haleakala	Pan-STARRS 1	·	1.6 km	MPC · JPL
532242	2013 PP_{76}	—	August 15, 2013	Haleakala	Pan-STARRS 1	·	1.9 km	MPC · JPL
532243	2013 PQ_{76}	—	February 10, 2011	Mount Lemmon	Mount Lemmon Survey	·	1.5 km	MPC · JPL
532244	2013 PV_{76}	—	January 27, 2011	Mount Lemmon	Mount Lemmon Survey	·	1.5 km	MPC · JPL
532245	2013 PW_{76}	—	February 23, 2007	Mount Lemmon	Mount Lemmon Survey	·	1.6 km	MPC · JPL
532246	2013 PX_{76}	—	October 12, 2009	Mount Lemmon	Mount Lemmon Survey	DOR	2.5 km	MPC · JPL
532247	2013 PY_{76}	—	August 15, 2013	Haleakala	Pan-STARRS 1	·	1.5 km	MPC · JPL
532248	2013 PZ_{76}	—	October 24, 2009	Kitt Peak	Spacewatch	·	1.6 km	MPC · JPL
532249	2013 PF_{77}	—	September 8, 2004	Socorro	LINEAR	·	1.8 km	MPC · JPL
532250	2013 PL_{78}	—	September 28, 2006	Kitt Peak	Spacewatch	·	1.4 km	MPC · JPL
532251	2013 PQ_{78}	—	March 28, 2012	Mount Lemmon	Mount Lemmon Survey	·	1.7 km	MPC · JPL
532252	2013 PT_{78}	—	August 12, 2013	Haleakala	Pan-STARRS 1	·	1.6 km	MPC · JPL
532253	2013 PW_{78}	—	August 8, 2013	Kitt Peak	Spacewatch	·	2.2 km	MPC · JPL
532254	2013 PD_{79}	—	August 15, 2013	Haleakala	Pan-STARRS 1	WIT	860 m	MPC · JPL
532255	2013 PE_{79}	—	February 7, 2011	Mount Lemmon	Mount Lemmon Survey	·	1.2 km	MPC · JPL
532256	2013 PG_{79}	—	August 23, 2004	Kitt Peak	Spacewatch	·	1.4 km	MPC · JPL
532257	2013 PO_{79}	—	August 7, 2013	Kitt Peak	Spacewatch	·	1.2 km	MPC · JPL
532258	2013 PP_{79}	—	August 7, 2013	Kitt Peak	Spacewatch	·	1.8 km	MPC · JPL
532259	2013 PD_{80}	—	March 16, 2012	Mount Lemmon	Mount Lemmon Survey	V	570 m	MPC · JPL
532260	2013 PS_{80}	—	August 12, 2013	Kitt Peak	Spacewatch	·	920 m	MPC · JPL
532261	2013 PY_{80}	—	January 28, 2011	Mount Lemmon	Mount Lemmon Survey	·	1.5 km	MPC · JPL
532262	2013 PE_{82}	—	August 14, 2013	Haleakala	Pan-STARRS 1	·	890 m	MPC · JPL
532263	2013 PL_{82}	—	January 5, 2006	Kitt Peak	Spacewatch	·	2.0 km	MPC · JPL
532264	2013 PP_{82}	—	August 15, 2013	Haleakala	Pan-STARRS 1	·	1.1 km	MPC · JPL
532265	2013 PU_{82}	—	September 13, 2004	Kitt Peak	Spacewatch	·	1.5 km	MPC · JPL
532266	2013 PW_{82}	—	August 15, 2013	Haleakala	Pan-STARRS 1	·	820 m	MPC · JPL
532267	2013 PZ_{82}	—	August 15, 2013	Haleakala	Pan-STARRS 1	KOR	1.1 km	MPC · JPL
532268	2013 PF_{83}	—	August 15, 2013	Haleakala	Pan-STARRS 1	·	1.5 km	MPC · JPL
532269	2013 PV_{83}	—	September 13, 2004	Kitt Peak	Spacewatch	·	1.8 km	MPC · JPL
532270	2013 PX_{83}	—	August 15, 2013	Haleakala	Pan-STARRS 1	·	2.2 km	MPC · JPL
532271	2013 PY_{83}	—	August 3, 2013	Haleakala	Pan-STARRS 1	·	970 m	MPC · JPL
532272	2013 QL	—	September 21, 2009	Catalina	CSS	·	1.1 km	MPC · JPL
532273	2013 QK_{4}	—	February 27, 2012	Haleakala	Pan-STARRS 1	·	1.6 km	MPC · JPL
532274	2013 QM_{5}	—	October 17, 2010	Mount Lemmon	Mount Lemmon Survey	·	420 m	MPC · JPL
532275	2013 QL_{12}	—	September 15, 2009	Kitt Peak	Spacewatch	·	1.3 km	MPC · JPL
532276	2013 QL_{15}	—	August 15, 2013	Haleakala	Pan-STARRS 1	·	1.5 km	MPC · JPL
532277	2013 QC_{18}	—	February 27, 2012	Haleakala	Pan-STARRS 1	EUN	1.2 km	MPC · JPL
532278	2013 QG_{20}	—	November 10, 2010	Mount Lemmon	Mount Lemmon Survey	·	560 m	MPC · JPL
532279	2013 QA_{24}	—	October 2, 2006	Mount Lemmon	Mount Lemmon Survey	3:2	4.8 km	MPC · JPL
532280	2013 QV_{25}	—	April 13, 2012	Haleakala	Pan-STARRS 1	·	1.4 km	MPC · JPL
532281	2013 QD_{28}	—	July 30, 2013	Kitt Peak	Spacewatch	·	600 m	MPC · JPL
532282	2013 QB_{33}	—	February 23, 2012	Mount Lemmon	Mount Lemmon Survey	PHO	1.0 km	MPC · JPL
532283	2013 QM_{34}	—	August 30, 2013	Haleakala	Pan-STARRS 1	·	1.2 km	MPC · JPL
532284	2013 QR_{36}	—	August 9, 2013	Kitt Peak	Spacewatch	·	1.5 km	MPC · JPL
532285	2013 QN_{37}	—	August 20, 2004	Catalina	CSS	·	2.1 km	MPC · JPL
532286	2013 QQ_{38}	—	June 30, 2008	Kitt Peak	Spacewatch	·	1.5 km	MPC · JPL
532287	2013 QT_{38}	—	November 21, 2009	Kitt Peak	Spacewatch	·	1.1 km	MPC · JPL
532288	2013 QX_{38}	—	August 1, 2013	Haleakala	Pan-STARRS 1	·	530 m	MPC · JPL
532289	2013 QD_{41}	—	August 28, 2013	Mount Lemmon	Mount Lemmon Survey	·	1.4 km	MPC · JPL
532290	2013 QV_{43}	—	August 18, 2013	Haleakala	Pan-STARRS 1	·	970 m	MPC · JPL
532291	2013 QH_{44}	—	August 29, 2006	Kitt Peak	Spacewatch	·	540 m	MPC · JPL
532292	2013 QO_{51}	—	September 11, 2004	Kitt Peak	Spacewatch	·	1.4 km	MPC · JPL
532293	2013 QV_{51}	—	April 5, 2010	Kitt Peak	Spacewatch	H	420 m	MPC · JPL
532294	2013 QR_{52}	—	August 15, 2013	Haleakala	Pan-STARRS 1	(1547)	1.1 km	MPC · JPL
532295	2013 QT_{53}	—	September 20, 2009	Kitt Peak	Spacewatch	·	1.3 km	MPC · JPL
532296	2013 QC_{54}	—	August 9, 2013	Catalina	CSS	·	1.7 km	MPC · JPL
532297	2013 QW_{56}	—	August 14, 2013	Haleakala	Pan-STARRS 1	(18466)	2.0 km	MPC · JPL
532298	2013 QQ_{57}	—	November 21, 2009	Kitt Peak	Spacewatch	·	1.5 km	MPC · JPL
532299	2013 QR_{59}	—	August 26, 2013	Haleakala	Pan-STARRS 1	·	1 km	MPC · JPL
532300	2013 QM_{62}	—	August 31, 2008	La Sagra	OAM	·	1.8 km	MPC · JPL

== 532301–532400 ==
back to top

Designation			Discovery			Properties		Ref
Permanent	Provisional	Named after	Date	Site	Discoverer(s)	Category	Diam.	Ref
532301	2013 QA_{64}	—	July 15, 2013	Haleakala	Pan-STARRS 1	EUN	1.1 km	MPC · JPL
532302	2013 QF_{65}	—	August 27, 2013	Haleakala	Pan-STARRS 1	·	1.5 km	MPC · JPL
532303	2013 QH_{65}	—	August 27, 2013	Haleakala	Pan-STARRS 1	·	2.2 km	MPC · JPL
532304	2013 QV_{67}	—	February 25, 2011	Mount Lemmon	Mount Lemmon Survey	·	1.9 km	MPC · JPL
532305	2013 QL_{69}	—	September 7, 2004	Kitt Peak	Spacewatch	·	1.5 km	MPC · JPL
532306	2013 QW_{72}	—	October 11, 2010	Mount Lemmon	Mount Lemmon Survey	·	570 m	MPC · JPL
532307	2013 QD_{74}	—	August 14, 2013	Haleakala	Pan-STARRS 1	·	1.1 km	MPC · JPL
532308	2013 QO_{74}	—	September 28, 2009	Catalina	CSS	·	1.3 km	MPC · JPL
532309	2013 QT_{74}	—	June 20, 2013	Haleakala	Pan-STARRS 1	·	550 m	MPC · JPL
532310	2013 QG_{79}	—	April 24, 2006	Kitt Peak	Spacewatch	·	580 m	MPC · JPL
532311	2013 QA_{80}	—	April 25, 2006	Kitt Peak	Spacewatch	·	480 m	MPC · JPL
532312	2013 QZ_{80}	—	January 10, 2011	Mount Lemmon	Mount Lemmon Survey	·	970 m	MPC · JPL
532313	2013 QA_{82}	—	August 31, 2013	Haleakala	Pan-STARRS 1	TIN	1.0 km	MPC · JPL
532314	2013 QE_{87}	—	February 13, 2011	Mount Lemmon	Mount Lemmon Survey	·	1.6 km	MPC · JPL
532315	2013 QF_{88}	—	September 17, 2004	Kitt Peak	Spacewatch	AST	1.4 km	MPC · JPL
532316	2013 QG_{92}	—	November 9, 2009	Kitt Peak	Spacewatch	·	1.7 km	MPC · JPL
532317	2013 QD_{93}	—	February 7, 2011	Mount Lemmon	Mount Lemmon Survey	·	1.8 km	MPC · JPL
532318	2013 QZ_{95}	—	February 8, 2011	Mount Lemmon	Mount Lemmon Survey	·	1.6 km	MPC · JPL
532319	2013 QF_{96}	—	August 28, 2013	Mount Lemmon	Mount Lemmon Survey	·	830 m	MPC · JPL
532320	2013 RP	—	September 30, 2003	Kitt Peak	Spacewatch	·	700 m	MPC · JPL
532321	2013 RQ_{1}	—	April 2, 2011	Mount Lemmon	Mount Lemmon Survey	·	1.5 km	MPC · JPL
532322	2013 RT_{1}	—	September 1, 2013	Haleakala	Pan-STARRS 1	·	1.8 km	MPC · JPL
532323	2013 RZ_{2}	—	September 6, 2008	Mount Lemmon	Mount Lemmon Survey	·	1.4 km	MPC · JPL
532324	2013 RC_{3}	—	September 1, 2013	Mount Lemmon	Mount Lemmon Survey	HOF	2.2 km	MPC · JPL
532325	2013 RR_{4}	—	September 2, 2013	Catalina	CSS	·	1.9 km	MPC · JPL
532326	2013 RH_{9}	—	September 23, 2004	Kitt Peak	Spacewatch	·	1.5 km	MPC · JPL
532327	2013 RJ_{9}	—	June 1, 2000	Kitt Peak	Spacewatch	·	450 m	MPC · JPL
532328	2013 RK_{9}	—	August 17, 2013	Haleakala	Pan-STARRS 1	·	1.8 km	MPC · JPL
532329	2013 RZ_{9}	—	August 15, 2013	Haleakala	Pan-STARRS 1	·	1.8 km	MPC · JPL
532330	2013 RC_{13}	—	August 12, 2013	Haleakala	Pan-STARRS 1	·	1.1 km	MPC · JPL
532331	2013 RE_{17}	—	November 10, 2009	Catalina	CSS	·	1.2 km	MPC · JPL
532332	2013 RR_{20}	—	February 7, 2010	WISE	WISE	·	2.1 km	MPC · JPL
532333	2013 RL_{22}	—	October 3, 2006	Mount Lemmon	Mount Lemmon Survey	ERI	1.2 km	MPC · JPL
532334	2013 RV_{22}	—	August 8, 2004	Socorro	LINEAR	·	1.4 km	MPC · JPL
532335	2013 RG_{24}	—	September 24, 2000	Socorro	LINEAR	JUN	960 m	MPC · JPL
532336	2013 RR_{24}	—	May 1, 2012	Mount Lemmon	Mount Lemmon Survey	MRX	1.1 km	MPC · JPL
532337	2013 RC_{25}	—	March 16, 2012	Mount Lemmon	Mount Lemmon Survey	·	860 m	MPC · JPL
532338	2013 RB_{26}	—	August 15, 2009	Kitt Peak	Spacewatch	·	1.7 km	MPC · JPL
532339	2013 RQ_{26}	—	March 28, 2008	Mount Lemmon	Mount Lemmon Survey	V	570 m	MPC · JPL
532340	2013 RS_{29}	—	April 19, 2012	Kitt Peak	Spacewatch	EUN	1.4 km	MPC · JPL
532341	2013 RX_{29}	—	September 5, 2013	Kitt Peak	Spacewatch	·	1.5 km	MPC · JPL
532342	2013 RZ_{30}	—	October 6, 2004	Kitt Peak	Spacewatch	(13314)	2.2 km	MPC · JPL
532343	2013 RC_{31}	—	April 1, 2009	Mount Lemmon	Mount Lemmon Survey	·	660 m	MPC · JPL
532344	2013 RP_{32}	—	November 9, 2009	Socorro	LINEAR	EUN	1.4 km	MPC · JPL
532345	2013 RS_{34}	—	September 4, 2013	Mount Lemmon	Mount Lemmon Survey	JUN	1.1 km	MPC · JPL
532346	2013 RP_{38}	—	September 3, 2013	Mount Lemmon	Mount Lemmon Survey	·	1.5 km	MPC · JPL
532347	2013 RV_{40}	—	September 5, 2013	Kitt Peak	Spacewatch	·	2.1 km	MPC · JPL
532348	2013 RB_{41}	—	September 5, 2013	Kitt Peak	Spacewatch	·	1.4 km	MPC · JPL
532349	2013 RJ_{41}	—	November 27, 2006	Mount Lemmon	Mount Lemmon Survey	MAS	640 m	MPC · JPL
532350	2013 RO_{42}	—	September 9, 2013	Haleakala	Pan-STARRS 1	H	520 m	MPC · JPL
532351	2013 RK_{44}	—	October 4, 2004	Kitt Peak	Spacewatch	·	1.7 km	MPC · JPL
532352	2013 RR_{44}	—	November 27, 2006	Mount Lemmon	Mount Lemmon Survey	NYS	1.4 km	MPC · JPL
532353	2013 RC_{45}	—	November 8, 2009	Mount Lemmon	Mount Lemmon Survey	·	2.0 km	MPC · JPL
532354	2013 RE_{46}	—	February 13, 2010	Mount Lemmon	Mount Lemmon Survey	·	1.5 km	MPC · JPL
532355	2013 RA_{48}	—	October 8, 2004	Kitt Peak	Spacewatch	AGN	1.0 km	MPC · JPL
532356	2013 RF_{48}	—	September 10, 2013	Haleakala	Pan-STARRS 1	BRA	1.2 km	MPC · JPL
532357	2013 RV_{48}	—	March 6, 2011	Mount Lemmon	Mount Lemmon Survey	·	1.8 km	MPC · JPL
532358	2013 RN_{51}	—	October 25, 2009	Kitt Peak	Spacewatch	·	1.4 km	MPC · JPL
532359	2013 RX_{51}	—	November 9, 2000	Socorro	LINEAR	·	1.7 km	MPC · JPL
532360	2013 RU_{52}	—	August 5, 2003	Socorro	LINEAR	·	770 m	MPC · JPL
532361	2013 RR_{53}	—	September 18, 2012	Mount Lemmon	Mount Lemmon Survey	L5	8.4 km	MPC · JPL
532362	2013 RL_{54}	—	August 15, 2013	Haleakala	Pan-STARRS 1	·	2.1 km	MPC · JPL
532363	2013 RC_{55}	—	August 17, 2013	Haleakala	Pan-STARRS 1	·	1.0 km	MPC · JPL
532364	2013 RV_{57}	—	July 30, 2008	Mount Lemmon	Mount Lemmon Survey	·	1.8 km	MPC · JPL
532365	2013 RM_{58}	—	October 31, 2010	Kitt Peak	Spacewatch	·	610 m	MPC · JPL
532366	2013 RH_{59}	—	November 11, 1999	Kitt Peak	Spacewatch	·	1.5 km	MPC · JPL
532367	2013 RR_{60}	—	August 15, 2013	Haleakala	Pan-STARRS 1	·	710 m	MPC · JPL
532368	2013 RF_{63}	—	September 1, 2013	Mount Lemmon	Mount Lemmon Survey	·	1.5 km	MPC · JPL
532369	2013 RQ_{65}	—	April 5, 2011	Mount Lemmon	Mount Lemmon Survey	GEF	850 m	MPC · JPL
532370	2013 RX_{66}	—	October 12, 2002	Socorro	LINEAR	·	3.1 km	MPC · JPL
532371	2013 RZ_{66}	—	September 21, 2009	Mount Lemmon	Mount Lemmon Survey	·	1.4 km	MPC · JPL
532372	2013 RM_{68}	—	September 7, 2008	Mount Lemmon	Mount Lemmon Survey	·	1.3 km	MPC · JPL
532373	2013 RZ_{68}	—	June 20, 2006	Mount Lemmon	Mount Lemmon Survey	·	660 m	MPC · JPL
532374	2013 RS_{74}	—	August 9, 2008	La Sagra	OAM	·	1.9 km	MPC · JPL
532375	2013 RR_{76}	—	February 5, 2011	Haleakala	Pan-STARRS 1	AST	1.5 km	MPC · JPL
532376	2013 RW_{76}	—	September 3, 2013	Haleakala	Pan-STARRS 1	HOF	2.0 km	MPC · JPL
532377	2013 RO_{79}	—	February 23, 2011	Kitt Peak	Spacewatch	·	1.7 km	MPC · JPL
532378	2013 RJ_{81}	—	October 8, 2004	Kitt Peak	Spacewatch	·	1.6 km	MPC · JPL
532379	2013 RQ_{81}	—	April 27, 2012	Haleakala	Pan-STARRS 1	·	1.4 km	MPC · JPL
532380	2013 RS_{81}	—	September 8, 1996	Kitt Peak	Spacewatch	·	680 m	MPC · JPL
532381	2013 RM_{83}	—	September 13, 2013	Kitt Peak	Spacewatch	·	640 m	MPC · JPL
532382	2013 RW_{85}	—	October 10, 2008	Mount Lemmon	Mount Lemmon Survey	·	1.3 km	MPC · JPL
532383	2013 RA_{86}	—	September 13, 2013	Kitt Peak	Spacewatch	HNS	980 m	MPC · JPL
532384	2013 RF_{90}	—	February 22, 2006	Catalina	CSS	·	1.7 km	MPC · JPL
532385	2013 RN_{90}	—	September 14, 2013	Kitt Peak	Spacewatch	·	2.8 km	MPC · JPL
532386	2013 RC_{91}	—	September 6, 2013	Kitt Peak	Spacewatch	·	1.9 km	MPC · JPL
532387	2013 RU_{91}	—	May 20, 2006	Kitt Peak	Spacewatch	·	3.5 km	MPC · JPL
532388	2013 RB_{94}	—	August 3, 2008	Siding Spring	SSS	·	1.9 km	MPC · JPL
532389	2013 RE_{97}	—	August 20, 2009	La Sagra	OAM	·	1.1 km	MPC · JPL
532390	2013 RX_{99}	—	October 7, 2004	Kitt Peak	Spacewatch	·	1.3 km	MPC · JPL
532391	2013 RB_{100}	—	November 28, 2000	Kitt Peak	Spacewatch	·	1.4 km	MPC · JPL
532392	2013 RM_{100}	—	September 6, 2013	Kitt Peak	Spacewatch	EOS	1.6 km	MPC · JPL
532393	2013 RS_{100}	—	March 8, 2005	Mount Lemmon	Mount Lemmon Survey	·	2.0 km	MPC · JPL
532394	2013 RY_{100}	—	January 8, 2006	Mount Lemmon	Mount Lemmon Survey	AST	1.5 km	MPC · JPL
532395	2013 RE_{101}	—	November 9, 2009	Mount Lemmon	Mount Lemmon Survey	MRX	930 m	MPC · JPL
532396	2013 RH_{101}	—	September 28, 2009	Kitt Peak	Spacewatch	·	1.1 km	MPC · JPL
532397	2013 RJ_{101}	—	September 21, 2009	Mount Lemmon	Mount Lemmon Survey	·	1.9 km	MPC · JPL
532398	2013 RM_{101}	—	February 5, 2011	Haleakala	Pan-STARRS 1	AGN	860 m	MPC · JPL
532399	2013 RT_{101}	—	January 28, 2009	Catalina	CSS	·	3.9 km	MPC · JPL
532400	2013 RU_{101}	—	September 3, 2013	Mount Lemmon	Mount Lemmon Survey	SUL	1.6 km	MPC · JPL

== 532401–532500 ==
back to top

Designation			Discovery			Properties		Ref
Permanent	Provisional	Named after	Date	Site	Discoverer(s)	Category	Diam.	Ref
532401	2013 RW_{101}	—	March 8, 2008	Mount Lemmon	Mount Lemmon Survey	·	1.2 km	MPC · JPL
532402	2013 RY_{101}	—	April 15, 2012	Haleakala	Pan-STARRS 1	·	1.2 km	MPC · JPL
532403	2013 RU_{102}	—	October 22, 2009	Mount Lemmon	Mount Lemmon Survey	·	1.3 km	MPC · JPL
532404	2013 RW_{102}	—	September 20, 2009	Mount Lemmon	Mount Lemmon Survey	·	1.2 km	MPC · JPL
532405	2013 RY_{102}	—	September 14, 2013	Mount Lemmon	Mount Lemmon Survey	·	1.7 km	MPC · JPL
532406	2013 RZ_{102}	—	November 29, 1999	Kitt Peak	Spacewatch	·	1.6 km	MPC · JPL
532407	2013 RF_{103}	—	September 6, 2013	Kitt Peak	Spacewatch	·	1.7 km	MPC · JPL
532408	2013 RG_{103}	—	April 16, 2012	Haleakala	Pan-STARRS 1	·	1.2 km	MPC · JPL
532409	2013 RP_{103}	—	September 18, 2003	Kitt Peak	Spacewatch	·	2.1 km	MPC · JPL
532410	2013 RQ_{103}	—	April 16, 2005	Kitt Peak	Spacewatch	·	3.3 km	MPC · JPL
532411	2013 RW_{103}	—	January 10, 2006	Mount Lemmon	Mount Lemmon Survey	·	1.2 km	MPC · JPL
532412	2013 RZ_{103}	—	September 1, 2013	Mount Lemmon	Mount Lemmon Survey	·	1.4 km	MPC · JPL
532413	2013 RB_{104}	—	September 1, 2013	Haleakala	Pan-STARRS 1	PHO	590 m	MPC · JPL
532414	2013 RH_{104}	—	September 3, 2013	Kitt Peak	Spacewatch	·	1.7 km	MPC · JPL
532415	2013 RK_{104}	—	September 3, 2013	Kitt Peak	Spacewatch	·	1.3 km	MPC · JPL
532416	2013 RJ_{105}	—	September 6, 2013	Mount Lemmon	Mount Lemmon Survey	·	1.8 km	MPC · JPL
532417	2013 RM_{105}	—	September 6, 2013	Mount Lemmon	Mount Lemmon Survey	GEF	1.0 km	MPC · JPL
532418	2013 RP_{105}	—	February 5, 2011	Mount Lemmon	Mount Lemmon Survey	V	490 m	MPC · JPL
532419	2013 RR_{105}	—	November 10, 2009	Kitt Peak	Spacewatch	·	1.9 km	MPC · JPL
532420	2013 RX_{105}	—	September 12, 2013	Mount Lemmon	Mount Lemmon Survey	·	2.3 km	MPC · JPL
532421	2013 RQ_{106}	—	September 14, 2013	Mount Lemmon	Mount Lemmon Survey	·	2.8 km	MPC · JPL
532422	2013 RY_{106}	—	September 14, 2013	Haleakala	Pan-STARRS 1	·	800 m	MPC · JPL
532423	2013 RB_{107}	—	September 14, 2013	Haleakala	Pan-STARRS 1	·	1.8 km	MPC · JPL
532424	2013 RD_{107}	—	September 14, 2013	Haleakala	Pan-STARRS 1	·	1.5 km	MPC · JPL
532425	2013 RG_{107}	—	September 15, 2013	Mount Lemmon	Mount Lemmon Survey	·	980 m	MPC · JPL
532426	2013 RM_{107}	—	September 1, 2013	Mount Lemmon	Mount Lemmon Survey	·	1.1 km	MPC · JPL
532427	2013 RG_{108}	—	September 3, 2013	Mount Lemmon	Mount Lemmon Survey	AGN	920 m	MPC · JPL
532428	2013 RS_{108}	—	September 10, 2013	Haleakala	Pan-STARRS 1	·	860 m	MPC · JPL
532429	2013 RW_{108}	—	November 17, 2009	Catalina	CSS	·	1.9 km	MPC · JPL
532430	2013 SL	—	July 25, 2010	WISE	WISE	·	1.4 km	MPC · JPL
532431	2013 SR_{8}	—	November 9, 2009	Mount Lemmon	Mount Lemmon Survey	NEM	1.7 km	MPC · JPL
532432	2013 SQ_{14}	—	November 19, 2009	Mount Lemmon	Mount Lemmon Survey	·	990 m	MPC · JPL
532433	2013 SJ_{15}	—	July 31, 2008	La Sagra	OAM	·	2.1 km	MPC · JPL
532434	2013 SV_{20}	—	August 20, 2004	Siding Spring	SSS	·	1.6 km	MPC · JPL
532435	2013 SU_{23}	—	August 27, 2013	Haleakala	Pan-STARRS 1	T_{j} (2.99) · 3:2	5.3 km	MPC · JPL
532436	2013 SE_{27}	—	September 5, 2013	Kitt Peak	Spacewatch	·	1.4 km	MPC · JPL
532437	2013 ST_{27}	—	February 9, 2011	Mount Lemmon	Mount Lemmon Survey	·	1.2 km	MPC · JPL
532438	2013 SP_{28}	—	November 2, 2000	Socorro	LINEAR	·	1.3 km	MPC · JPL
532439	2013 SE_{29}	—	September 6, 2013	Kitt Peak	Spacewatch	DOR	2.4 km	MPC · JPL
532440	2013 SM_{30}	—	September 9, 2013	Haleakala	Pan-STARRS 1	·	1.5 km	MPC · JPL
532441	2013 SV_{30}	—	February 2, 2008	Kitt Peak	Spacewatch	·	1.2 km	MPC · JPL
532442	2013 SE_{32}	—	September 25, 2013	Mount Lemmon	Mount Lemmon Survey	·	1.6 km	MPC · JPL
532443	2013 SN_{32}	—	February 26, 2009	Kitt Peak	Spacewatch	·	610 m	MPC · JPL
532444	2013 SJ_{33}	—	November 6, 2005	Anderson Mesa	LONEOS	·	1.2 km	MPC · JPL
532445	2013 SL_{33}	—	March 12, 2007	Kitt Peak	Spacewatch	·	1.4 km	MPC · JPL
532446	2013 SN_{35}	—	September 1, 2013	Mount Lemmon	Mount Lemmon Survey	·	1.5 km	MPC · JPL
532447	2013 SF_{38}	—	February 8, 2011	Mount Lemmon	Mount Lemmon Survey	·	1.8 km	MPC · JPL
532448	2013 SM_{38}	—	August 5, 2008	La Sagra	OAM	·	2.6 km	MPC · JPL
532449	2013 SQ_{38}	—	March 30, 2011	Mount Lemmon	Mount Lemmon Survey	KOR	1.2 km	MPC · JPL
532450	2013 SZ_{39}	—	June 8, 2013	Mount Lemmon	Mount Lemmon Survey	·	2.5 km	MPC · JPL
532451	2013 ST_{40}	—	September 18, 2006	Kitt Peak	Spacewatch	·	660 m	MPC · JPL
532452	2013 SR_{41}	—	September 16, 2004	Kitt Peak	Spacewatch	·	1.4 km	MPC · JPL
532453	2013 SH_{42}	—	September 15, 2009	Kitt Peak	Spacewatch	·	1.0 km	MPC · JPL
532454	2013 SP_{45}	—	February 20, 2012	Kitt Peak	Spacewatch	PHO	900 m	MPC · JPL
532455	2013 SH_{46}	—	September 6, 2008	Mount Lemmon	Mount Lemmon Survey	KOR	1.3 km	MPC · JPL
532456	2013 SS_{46}	—	September 23, 2008	Mount Lemmon	Mount Lemmon Survey	·	1.5 km	MPC · JPL
532457	2013 ST_{50}	—	September 28, 2013	Haleakala	Pan-STARRS 1	H	440 m	MPC · JPL
532458	2013 SX_{52}	—	November 10, 2004	Kitt Peak	Spacewatch	·	1.6 km	MPC · JPL
532459	2013 SE_{59}	—	October 24, 2008	Kitt Peak	Spacewatch	H	520 m	MPC · JPL
532460	2013 SS_{59}	—	July 30, 2013	Kitt Peak	Spacewatch	·	1.7 km	MPC · JPL
532461	2013 SZ_{60}	—	September 5, 2013	Kitt Peak	Spacewatch	·	1.2 km	MPC · JPL
532462	2013 SE_{61}	—	August 15, 2013	Haleakala	Pan-STARRS 1	V	590 m	MPC · JPL
532463	2013 ST_{61}	—	November 17, 2009	Kitt Peak	Spacewatch	·	1.4 km	MPC · JPL
532464	2013 SR_{62}	—	October 27, 2008	Mount Lemmon	Mount Lemmon Survey	·	1.6 km	MPC · JPL
532465	2013 SF_{63}	—	September 2, 2013	Mount Lemmon	Mount Lemmon Survey	·	1.0 km	MPC · JPL
532466	2013 SY_{63}	—	September 7, 2008	Mount Lemmon	Mount Lemmon Survey	·	1.4 km	MPC · JPL
532467	2013 SM_{66}	—	September 3, 2013	Mount Lemmon	Mount Lemmon Survey	·	1.7 km	MPC · JPL
532468	2013 SV_{67}	—	June 6, 1999	Kitt Peak	Spacewatch	HNS	1.3 km	MPC · JPL
532469	2013 SZ_{68}	—	October 7, 2004	Kitt Peak	Spacewatch	·	1.5 km	MPC · JPL
532470	2013 SY_{70}	—	January 10, 2006	Mount Lemmon	Mount Lemmon Survey	MIS	1.7 km	MPC · JPL
532471	2013 SS_{71}	—	April 21, 2007	Cerro Tololo	Deep Ecliptic Survey	·	1.4 km	MPC · JPL
532472	2013 ST_{73}	—	October 14, 2009	Mount Lemmon	Mount Lemmon Survey	·	1.1 km	MPC · JPL
532473	2013 SF_{78}	—	November 9, 2009	Kitt Peak	Spacewatch	·	1.1 km	MPC · JPL
532474	2013 SX_{78}	—	August 8, 2004	Socorro	LINEAR	JUN	970 m	MPC · JPL
532475	2013 SQ_{81}	—	September 27, 2006	Mount Lemmon	Mount Lemmon Survey	PHO	960 m	MPC · JPL
532476	2013 SU_{81}	—	February 4, 2011	Catalina	CSS	HNS	1.0 km	MPC · JPL
532477	2013 SY_{82}	—	May 24, 2010	WISE	WISE	·	3.5 km	MPC · JPL
532478	2013 SF_{84}	—	December 18, 2009	Mount Lemmon	Mount Lemmon Survey	·	1.6 km	MPC · JPL
532479	2013 SJ_{85}	—	December 19, 2009	Mount Lemmon	Mount Lemmon Survey	·	1.4 km	MPC · JPL
532480	2013 SW_{85}	—	February 4, 2010	WISE	WISE	·	1.7 km	MPC · JPL
532481	2013 SH_{101}	—	August 25, 2012	Kitt Peak	Spacewatch	·	3.1 km	MPC · JPL
532482	2013 SP_{101}	—	September 17, 2013	Mount Lemmon	Mount Lemmon Survey	·	1.2 km	MPC · JPL
532483	2013 SU_{101}	—	September 25, 2013	Mount Lemmon	Mount Lemmon Survey	·	1.2 km	MPC · JPL
532484	2013 SB_{102}	—	September 26, 2013	Mount Lemmon	Mount Lemmon Survey	L5	6.7 km	MPC · JPL
532485	2013 TD_{1}	—	November 17, 2009	Kitt Peak	Spacewatch	·	1.9 km	MPC · JPL
532486	2013 TA_{5}	—	April 11, 2005	Mount Lemmon	Mount Lemmon Survey	H	330 m	MPC · JPL
532487	2013 TD_{5}	—	October 6, 2008	Siding Spring	SSS	H	360 m	MPC · JPL
532488	2013 TM_{5}	—	December 9, 2004	Catalina	CSS	·	2.1 km	MPC · JPL
532489	2013 TH_{10}	—	October 3, 2013	Palomar	Palomar Transient Factory	KOR	1.4 km	MPC · JPL
532490	2013 TG_{11}	—	September 27, 2008	Mount Lemmon	Mount Lemmon Survey	·	1.8 km	MPC · JPL
532491	2013 TB_{13}	—	November 3, 2010	Kitt Peak	Spacewatch	·	620 m	MPC · JPL
532492	2013 TW_{13}	—	January 10, 2010	Mount Lemmon	Mount Lemmon Survey	·	1.5 km	MPC · JPL
532493	2013 TZ_{14}	—	September 14, 2013	Haleakala	Pan-STARRS 1	PHO	680 m	MPC · JPL
532494	2013 TF_{15}	—	October 1, 2013	Mount Lemmon	Mount Lemmon Survey	·	1.7 km	MPC · JPL
532495	2013 TR_{19}	—	November 8, 2009	Mount Lemmon	Mount Lemmon Survey	·	910 m	MPC · JPL
532496	2013 TG_{22}	—	April 2, 2010	WISE	WISE	·	2.1 km	MPC · JPL
532497	2013 TU_{22}	—	October 1, 2013	Mount Lemmon	Mount Lemmon Survey	DOR	2.4 km	MPC · JPL
532498	2013 TA_{25}	—	September 14, 2013	Mount Lemmon	Mount Lemmon Survey	·	2.2 km	MPC · JPL
532499	2013 TA_{26}	—	September 15, 2013	Mount Lemmon	Mount Lemmon Survey	EOS	1.4 km	MPC · JPL
532500	2013 TH_{26}	—	October 6, 2004	Kitt Peak	Spacewatch	PAD	1.3 km	MPC · JPL

== 532501–532600 ==
back to top

Designation			Discovery			Properties		Ref
Permanent	Provisional	Named after	Date	Site	Discoverer(s)	Category	Diam.	Ref
532501	2013 TD_{27}	—	September 20, 2008	Mount Lemmon	Mount Lemmon Survey	KOR	1.1 km	MPC · JPL
532502	2013 TU_{28}	—	September 6, 2013	Catalina	CSS	·	1.2 km	MPC · JPL
532503	2013 TA_{30}	—	September 29, 2005	Kitt Peak	Spacewatch	H	470 m	MPC · JPL
532504	2013 TX_{32}	—	April 14, 2010	WISE	WISE	·	1.7 km	MPC · JPL
532505	2013 TD_{35}	—	September 1, 2013	Catalina	CSS	·	2.5 km	MPC · JPL
532506	2013 TG_{35}	—	December 14, 2004	Kitt Peak	Spacewatch	·	1.6 km	MPC · JPL
532507	2013 TM_{37}	—	September 28, 2008	Catalina	CSS	·	1.5 km	MPC · JPL
532508	2013 TR_{38}	—	October 2, 2013	Kitt Peak	Spacewatch	·	3.0 km	MPC · JPL
532509	2013 TT_{38}	—	October 2, 2013	Kitt Peak	Spacewatch	·	3.3 km	MPC · JPL
532510	2013 TV_{40}	—	October 2, 2013	Mount Lemmon	Mount Lemmon Survey	·	1.7 km	MPC · JPL
532511	2013 TY_{40}	—	October 8, 2004	Kitt Peak	Spacewatch	·	1.3 km	MPC · JPL
532512	2013 TP_{42}	—	September 9, 2004	Socorro	LINEAR	·	2.1 km	MPC · JPL
532513	2013 TL_{43}	—	September 13, 2013	Mount Lemmon	Mount Lemmon Survey	DOR	2.0 km	MPC · JPL
532514	2013 TP_{43}	—	October 3, 2013	Kitt Peak	Spacewatch	·	1.2 km	MPC · JPL
532515	2013 TC_{48}	—	September 16, 2013	Catalina	CSS	·	1.6 km	MPC · JPL
532516	2013 TS_{49}	—	August 23, 2008	Siding Spring	SSS	·	1.8 km	MPC · JPL
532517	2013 TE_{51}	—	July 20, 2013	Haleakala	Pan-STARRS 1	·	3.9 km	MPC · JPL
532518	2013 TF_{53}	—	October 4, 2013	Kitt Peak	Spacewatch	·	1.1 km	MPC · JPL
532519	2013 TC_{54}	—	October 22, 2008	Kitt Peak	Spacewatch	·	1.6 km	MPC · JPL
532520	2013 TY_{56}	—	October 9, 2004	Kitt Peak	Spacewatch	·	2.0 km	MPC · JPL
532521	2013 TR_{57}	—	October 4, 2013	Mount Lemmon	Mount Lemmon Survey	·	1.4 km	MPC · JPL
532522	2013 TJ_{67}	—	September 22, 2009	Mount Lemmon	Mount Lemmon Survey	·	1.4 km	MPC · JPL
532523	2013 TC_{68}	—	August 15, 2013	Haleakala	Pan-STARRS 1	·	1.2 km	MPC · JPL
532524	2013 TU_{70}	—	September 1, 2013	Mount Lemmon	Mount Lemmon Survey	KOR	1.2 km	MPC · JPL
532525	2013 TA_{71}	—	November 9, 2004	Catalina	CSS	DOR	2.1 km	MPC · JPL
532526	2013 TJ_{71}	—	October 2, 2013	Kitt Peak	Spacewatch	·	2.1 km	MPC · JPL
532527	2013 TT_{71}	—	September 1, 2013	Mount Lemmon	Mount Lemmon Survey	AGN	940 m	MPC · JPL
532528	2013 TU_{71}	—	September 25, 2013	Mount Lemmon	Mount Lemmon Survey	V	480 m	MPC · JPL
532529	2013 TB_{72}	—	May 12, 2012	Mount Lemmon	Mount Lemmon Survey	·	1.4 km	MPC · JPL
532530	2013 TB_{73}	—	September 28, 2013	Mount Lemmon	Mount Lemmon Survey	·	1.9 km	MPC · JPL
532531	2013 TA_{75}	—	August 15, 2009	Catalina	CSS	·	1.1 km	MPC · JPL
532532	2013 TN_{76}	—	September 29, 2013	Mount Lemmon	Mount Lemmon Survey	·	2.7 km	MPC · JPL
532533	2013 TY_{77}	—	November 2, 2008	Mount Lemmon	Mount Lemmon Survey	·	1.3 km	MPC · JPL
532534	2013 TP_{78}	—	September 15, 2013	Haleakala	Pan-STARRS 1	·	990 m	MPC · JPL
532535	2013 TW_{78}	—	April 15, 2010	WISE	WISE	·	2.5 km	MPC · JPL
532536	2013 TT_{82}	—	July 29, 2008	Mount Lemmon	Mount Lemmon Survey	·	2.4 km	MPC · JPL
532537	2013 TD_{83}	—	August 2, 2011	Haleakala	Pan-STARRS 1	L5	7.5 km	MPC · JPL
532538	2013 TF_{90}	—	September 29, 2008	Mount Lemmon	Mount Lemmon Survey	·	1.6 km	MPC · JPL
532539	2013 TG_{92}	—	October 6, 2004	Kitt Peak	Spacewatch	·	1.4 km	MPC · JPL
532540	2013 TJ_{92}	—	July 20, 2013	Haleakala	Pan-STARRS 1	·	2.6 km	MPC · JPL
532541	2013 TD_{95}	—	September 30, 2006	Mount Lemmon	Mount Lemmon Survey	·	740 m	MPC · JPL
532542	2013 TN_{96}	—	November 10, 2005	Mount Lemmon	Mount Lemmon Survey	(5)	1.1 km	MPC · JPL
532543	2013 TR_{96}	—	September 5, 2013	Haleakala	Pan-STARRS 1	·	2.2 km	MPC · JPL
532544	2013 TA_{97}	—	September 23, 2009	Kitt Peak	Spacewatch	·	1.6 km	MPC · JPL
532545	2013 TA_{99}	—	October 8, 2008	Kitt Peak	Spacewatch	·	1.4 km	MPC · JPL
532546	2013 TN_{100}	—	January 26, 2011	Mount Lemmon	Mount Lemmon Survey	·	980 m	MPC · JPL
532547	2013 TU_{100}	—	October 8, 2008	Kitt Peak	Spacewatch	·	1.3 km	MPC · JPL
532548	2013 TO_{102}	—	October 2, 2013	Mount Lemmon	Mount Lemmon Survey	·	1.4 km	MPC · JPL
532549	2013 TE_{105}	—	April 2, 2010	WISE	WISE	·	2.3 km	MPC · JPL
532550	2013 TA_{107}	—	November 29, 2000	Kitt Peak	Spacewatch	·	1.4 km	MPC · JPL
532551	2013 TX_{109}	—	December 1, 2008	Kitt Peak	Spacewatch	·	2.3 km	MPC · JPL
532552	2013 TC_{110}	—	October 3, 2013	Kitt Peak	Spacewatch	·	1.5 km	MPC · JPL
532553	2013 TK_{110}	—	July 20, 2013	Haleakala	Pan-STARRS 1	·	2.2 km	MPC · JPL
532554	2013 TY_{113}	—	September 17, 2009	Kitt Peak	Spacewatch	PHO	900 m	MPC · JPL
532555	2013 TF_{114}	—	September 14, 2013	Mount Lemmon	Mount Lemmon Survey	·	2.3 km	MPC · JPL
532556	2013 TO_{114}	—	October 11, 2004	Kitt Peak	Spacewatch	·	1.4 km	MPC · JPL
532557	2013 TE_{116}	—	November 18, 2008	Kitt Peak	Spacewatch	·	2.6 km	MPC · JPL
532558	2013 TD_{120}	—	October 1, 2000	Socorro	LINEAR	·	1.4 km	MPC · JPL
532559	2013 TT_{121}	—	September 12, 2013	Mount Lemmon	Mount Lemmon Survey	·	1.3 km	MPC · JPL
532560	2013 TV_{121}	—	October 27, 2008	Kitt Peak	Spacewatch	·	1.8 km	MPC · JPL
532561	2013 TO_{122}	—	November 24, 2009	Kitt Peak	Spacewatch	·	1.8 km	MPC · JPL
532562	2013 TT_{126}	—	December 3, 2010	Mount Lemmon	Mount Lemmon Survey	EUN	1.4 km	MPC · JPL
532563	2013 TR_{127}	—	April 2, 2011	Mount Lemmon	Mount Lemmon Survey	·	1.8 km	MPC · JPL
532564	2013 TX_{130}	—	January 8, 2010	Mount Lemmon	Mount Lemmon Survey	·	1.6 km	MPC · JPL
532565	2013 TF_{131}	—	October 2, 2013	Haleakala	Pan-STARRS 1	·	1.8 km	MPC · JPL
532566	2013 TW_{133}	—	September 4, 2013	Mount Lemmon	Mount Lemmon Survey	·	1.8 km	MPC · JPL
532567	2013 TV_{134}	—	May 1, 2011	Haleakala	Pan-STARRS 1	EOS	2.1 km	MPC · JPL
532568	2013 TM_{136}	—	May 29, 2010	WISE	WISE	·	3.1 km	MPC · JPL
532569	2013 TP_{141}	—	October 8, 2008	Kitt Peak	Spacewatch	·	1.6 km	MPC · JPL
532570	2013 TC_{143}	—	June 30, 2010	WISE	WISE	·	3.0 km	MPC · JPL
532571	2013 TM_{144}	—	October 3, 2013	Haleakala	Pan-STARRS 1	·	1.2 km	MPC · JPL
532572	2013 TR_{144}	—	April 20, 2012	Mount Lemmon	Mount Lemmon Survey	·	890 m	MPC · JPL
532573	2013 TH_{145}	—	October 3, 2013	Mount Lemmon	Mount Lemmon Survey	·	2.2 km	MPC · JPL
532574	2013 TD_{147}	—	January 16, 2008	Mount Lemmon	Mount Lemmon Survey	·	620 m	MPC · JPL
532575	2013 TG_{151}	—	October 9, 2008	Mount Lemmon	Mount Lemmon Survey	KOR	1.1 km	MPC · JPL
532576	2013 TK_{161}	—	October 15, 2004	Mount Lemmon	Mount Lemmon Survey	·	1.8 km	MPC · JPL
532577	2013 TR_{161}	—	October 1, 2013	Mount Lemmon	Mount Lemmon Survey	·	590 m	MPC · JPL
532578	2013 TW_{161}	—	February 7, 2006	Kitt Peak	Spacewatch	·	1.4 km	MPC · JPL
532579	2013 TY_{161}	—	November 3, 2005	Mount Lemmon	Mount Lemmon Survey	(5)	1.1 km	MPC · JPL
532580	2013 TA_{162}	—	October 3, 2013	Haleakala	Pan-STARRS 1	·	1.1 km	MPC · JPL
532581	2013 TB_{162}	—	October 13, 2013	Kitt Peak	Spacewatch	·	1.3 km	MPC · JPL
532582	2013 TC_{162}	—	November 1, 2005	Mount Lemmon	Mount Lemmon Survey	·	830 m	MPC · JPL
532583	2013 TE_{162}	—	February 28, 2010	WISE	WISE	·	1.9 km	MPC · JPL
532584	2013 TZ_{162}	—	October 8, 2013	Mount Lemmon	Mount Lemmon Survey	·	2.8 km	MPC · JPL
532585	2013 TH_{163}	—	September 9, 2008	Mount Lemmon	Mount Lemmon Survey	·	1.7 km	MPC · JPL
532586	2013 TO_{163}	—	October 3, 2013	Haleakala	Pan-STARRS 1	·	1.9 km	MPC · JPL
532587	2013 TR_{163}	—	June 8, 2012	Mount Lemmon	Mount Lemmon Survey	·	1.6 km	MPC · JPL
532588	2013 TT_{163}	—	October 9, 2013	Mount Lemmon	Mount Lemmon Survey	·	1.7 km	MPC · JPL
532589	2013 TV_{163}	—	October 13, 2013	Kitt Peak	Spacewatch	·	1.4 km	MPC · JPL
532590	2013 TG_{164}	—	October 7, 2013	Mount Lemmon	Mount Lemmon Survey	·	2.0 km	MPC · JPL
532591	2013 TW_{164}	—	October 2, 2013	Mount Lemmon	Mount Lemmon Survey	·	1.4 km	MPC · JPL
532592	2013 TC_{165}	—	May 30, 2008	Mount Lemmon	Mount Lemmon Survey	·	1.2 km	MPC · JPL
532593	2013 TD_{165}	—	October 12, 2007	Catalina	CSS	HYG	3.4 km	MPC · JPL
532594	2013 TE_{165}	—	August 22, 2004	Kitt Peak	Spacewatch	MIS	2.4 km	MPC · JPL
532595	2013 TV_{165}	—	October 2, 2013	Haleakala	Pan-STARRS 1	·	1.5 km	MPC · JPL
532596	2013 TY_{165}	—	September 19, 2008	Kitt Peak	Spacewatch	KOR	1.0 km	MPC · JPL
532597	2013 TG_{166}	—	October 2, 2013	Haleakala	Pan-STARRS 1	·	910 m	MPC · JPL
532598	2013 TP_{166}	—	October 25, 2008	Kitt Peak	Spacewatch	·	1.5 km	MPC · JPL
532599	2013 TR_{166}	—	October 23, 2009	Mount Lemmon	Mount Lemmon Survey	·	1.1 km	MPC · JPL
532600	2013 TT_{166}	—	October 3, 2013	Kitt Peak	Spacewatch	·	1.2 km	MPC · JPL

== 532601–532700 ==
back to top

Designation			Discovery			Properties		Ref
Permanent	Provisional	Named after	Date	Site	Discoverer(s)	Category	Diam.	Ref
532601	2013 TF_{167}	—	May 20, 2012	Mount Lemmon	Mount Lemmon Survey	·	950 m	MPC · JPL
532602	2013 TO_{167}	—	September 20, 2008	Mount Lemmon	Mount Lemmon Survey	·	1.6 km	MPC · JPL
532603	2013 TC_{168}	—	October 3, 2013	Haleakala	Pan-STARRS 1	·	960 m	MPC · JPL
532604	2013 TD_{168}	—	October 3, 2013	Haleakala	Pan-STARRS 1	·	1.2 km	MPC · JPL
532605	2013 TF_{168}	—	March 30, 2011	Mount Lemmon	Mount Lemmon Survey	KOR	1.1 km	MPC · JPL
532606	2013 TK_{168}	—	October 3, 2013	Haleakala	Pan-STARRS 1	·	1.1 km	MPC · JPL
532607	2013 TQ_{168}	—	October 15, 2004	Kitt Peak	Spacewatch	·	1.4 km	MPC · JPL
532608	2013 TB_{169}	—	March 31, 2008	Kitt Peak	Spacewatch	·	1.0 km	MPC · JPL
532609	2013 TK_{169}	—	October 28, 2005	Mount Lemmon	Mount Lemmon Survey	(5)	940 m	MPC · JPL
532610	2013 TZ_{169}	—	October 9, 2013	Kitt Peak	Spacewatch	EOS	1.6 km	MPC · JPL
532611	2013 TB_{170}	—	September 7, 2008	Mount Lemmon	Mount Lemmon Survey	·	1.5 km	MPC · JPL
532612	2013 TE_{170}	—	May 3, 2008	Kitt Peak	Spacewatch	·	1.3 km	MPC · JPL
532613	2013 TX_{170}	—	October 14, 2013	Mount Lemmon	Mount Lemmon Survey	EOS	1.9 km	MPC · JPL
532614	2013 TE_{171}	—	October 2, 2013	Kitt Peak	Spacewatch	(5)	880 m	MPC · JPL
532615	2013 TJ_{171}	—	March 14, 2007	Mount Lemmon	Mount Lemmon Survey	L5	8.2 km	MPC · JPL
532616	2013 TL_{171}	—	October 2, 2013	Catalina	CSS	PHO	950 m	MPC · JPL
532617	2013 TO_{171}	—	March 13, 2011	Mount Lemmon	Mount Lemmon Survey	·	1.7 km	MPC · JPL
532618	2013 TR_{171}	—	October 5, 2013	Haleakala	Pan-STARRS 1	V	500 m	MPC · JPL
532619	2013 TW_{171}	—	October 13, 2013	Mount Lemmon	Mount Lemmon Survey	·	2.0 km	MPC · JPL
532620	2013 UD	—	October 16, 2013	Mount Lemmon	Mount Lemmon Survey	H	650 m	MPC · JPL
532621	2013 UJ	—	October 4, 2013	Catalina	CSS	H	420 m	MPC · JPL
532622	2013 UR	—	October 20, 2008	Kitt Peak	Spacewatch	H	310 m	MPC · JPL
532623	2013 UW_{2}	—	September 25, 2013	Kitt Peak	Spacewatch	H	540 m	MPC · JPL
532624	2013 UL_{6}	—	September 28, 2008	Mount Lemmon	Mount Lemmon Survey	·	2.6 km	MPC · JPL
532625	2013 UU_{6}	—	May 13, 2012	Mount Lemmon	Mount Lemmon Survey	·	1.9 km	MPC · JPL
532626	2013 UD_{8}	—	October 2, 2013	Kitt Peak	Spacewatch	·	2.3 km	MPC · JPL
532627	2013 UD_{9}	—	October 2, 2013	Catalina	CSS	H	530 m	MPC · JPL
532628	2013 UB_{10}	—	October 12, 2013	Kitt Peak	Spacewatch	·	1.5 km	MPC · JPL
532629	2013 UO_{11}	—	October 15, 2013	Mount Lemmon	Mount Lemmon Survey	·	1.8 km	MPC · JPL
532630	2013 UJ_{12}	—	July 14, 2013	Haleakala	Pan-STARRS 1	·	1.8 km	MPC · JPL
532631	2013 UY_{12}	—	November 25, 2005	Kitt Peak	Spacewatch	·	1.1 km	MPC · JPL
532632	2013 UP_{13}	—	September 22, 2008	Mount Lemmon	Mount Lemmon Survey	(18466)	2.1 km	MPC · JPL
532633	2013 UA_{14}	—	April 5, 2011	Kitt Peak	Spacewatch	EOS	1.9 km	MPC · JPL
532634	2013 UX_{15}	—	August 25, 2000	Cerro Tololo	Deep Ecliptic Survey	L5	5.9 km	MPC · JPL
532635	2013 UF_{16}	—	January 16, 2004	Kitt Peak	Spacewatch	·	1.3 km	MPC · JPL
532636	2013 UR_{16}	—	September 28, 2003	Anderson Mesa	LONEOS	·	2.3 km	MPC · JPL
532637	2013 UU_{16}	—	November 20, 2008	Kitt Peak	Spacewatch	EOS	1.7 km	MPC · JPL
532638	2013 UM_{18}	—	July 19, 2007	Mount Lemmon	Mount Lemmon Survey	KOR	1.6 km	MPC · JPL
532639	2013 UN_{18}	—	November 27, 2009	Mount Lemmon	Mount Lemmon Survey	·	2.8 km	MPC · JPL
532640	2013 UO_{18}	—	November 17, 1998	Kitt Peak	Spacewatch	KOR	2.8 km	MPC · JPL
532641	2013 UB_{19}	—	March 27, 2011	Mount Lemmon	Mount Lemmon Survey	·	2.1 km	MPC · JPL
532642	2013 UD_{19}	—	September 4, 2000	Kitt Peak	Spacewatch	·	1.1 km	MPC · JPL
532643	2013 UM_{19}	—	December 2, 2005	Kitt Peak	Spacewatch	·	2.0 km	MPC · JPL
532644	2013 UR_{19}	—	November 20, 2009	Kitt Peak	Spacewatch	·	1.6 km	MPC · JPL
532645	2013 UE_{20}	—	October 24, 2013	Kitt Peak	Spacewatch	·	1.8 km	MPC · JPL
532646	2013 UP_{20}	—	October 25, 2013	Mount Lemmon	Mount Lemmon Survey	·	1.0 km	MPC · JPL
532647	2013 UX_{20}	—	January 12, 2010	Mount Lemmon	Mount Lemmon Survey	·	1.4 km	MPC · JPL
532648	2013 UA_{21}	—	November 22, 2008	Kitt Peak	Spacewatch	·	2.0 km	MPC · JPL
532649	2013 UG_{21}	—	October 26, 2013	Kitt Peak	Spacewatch	·	1.5 km	MPC · JPL
532650	2013 UM_{21}	—	October 26, 2013	Kitt Peak	Spacewatch	·	1.1 km	MPC · JPL
532651	2013 UQ_{21}	—	October 26, 2013	Mount Lemmon	Mount Lemmon Survey	·	2.3 km	MPC · JPL
532652	2013 UR_{21}	—	May 21, 2011	Mount Lemmon	Mount Lemmon Survey	·	2.4 km	MPC · JPL
532653	2013 UT_{21}	—	May 25, 2006	Mount Lemmon	Mount Lemmon Survey	·	2.2 km	MPC · JPL
532654	2013 UV_{21}	—	September 14, 2007	Kitt Peak	Spacewatch	·	2.0 km	MPC · JPL
532655	2013 UY_{21}	—	November 21, 2008	Kitt Peak	Spacewatch	·	2.2 km	MPC · JPL
532656	2013 UG_{22}	—	October 30, 2007	Mount Lemmon	Mount Lemmon Survey	·	2.9 km	MPC · JPL
532657	2013 UP_{22}	—	October 30, 2013	Haleakala	Pan-STARRS 1	·	1 km	MPC · JPL
532658	2013 VN	—	October 6, 2013	Kitt Peak	Spacewatch	·	3.6 km	MPC · JPL
532659	2013 VT	—	October 14, 2013	Mount Lemmon	Mount Lemmon Survey	·	1.9 km	MPC · JPL
532660	2013 VE_{2}	—	November 1, 2013	Mount Lemmon	Mount Lemmon Survey	centaur	10 km	MPC · JPL
532661	2013 VN_{3}	—	November 1, 2013	Catalina	CSS	·	2.0 km	MPC · JPL
532662	2013 VF_{4}	—	October 2, 2013	Kitt Peak	Spacewatch	·	1.3 km	MPC · JPL
532663	2013 VD_{5}	—	November 4, 2013	Kitt Peak	Spacewatch	H	560 m	MPC · JPL
532664	2013 VP_{5}	—	October 3, 2013	Catalina	CSS	·	1.7 km	MPC · JPL
532665	2013 VH_{6}	—	October 7, 2013	Catalina	CSS	·	1.7 km	MPC · JPL
532666	2013 VW_{9}	—	October 16, 2013	Catalina	CSS	·	1.9 km	MPC · JPL
532667	2013 VW_{10}	—	November 7, 2008	Mount Lemmon	Mount Lemmon Survey	·	2.0 km	MPC · JPL
532668	2013 VW_{11}	—	July 19, 2013	Haleakala	Pan-STARRS 1	H	470 m	MPC · JPL
532669	2013 VC_{12}	—	November 3, 2008	Catalina	CSS	H	420 m	MPC · JPL
532670	2013 VD_{12}	—	November 9, 2013	Haleakala	Pan-STARRS 1	H	400 m	MPC · JPL
532671	2013 VS_{16}	—	July 20, 2013	Haleakala	Pan-STARRS 1	·	1.8 km	MPC · JPL
532672	2013 VB_{18}	—	April 24, 2012	Haleakala	Pan-STARRS 1	H	500 m	MPC · JPL
532673	2013 VK_{18}	—	November 2, 2013	Mount Lemmon	Mount Lemmon Survey	·	2.6 km	MPC · JPL
532674	2013 VV_{19}	—	July 18, 2013	Haleakala	Pan-STARRS 1	·	1.9 km	MPC · JPL
532675	2013 VN_{21}	—	March 31, 2010	WISE	WISE	·	2.2 km	MPC · JPL
532676	2013 VN_{22}	—	September 14, 2013	Mount Lemmon	Mount Lemmon Survey	·	1.7 km	MPC · JPL
532677	2013 VA_{25}	—	March 17, 2010	WISE	WISE	·	1.9 km	MPC · JPL
532678	2013 VE_{25}	—	November 1, 2013	Mount Lemmon	Mount Lemmon Survey	·	1.3 km	MPC · JPL
532679	2013 VG_{25}	—	September 5, 2008	Kitt Peak	Spacewatch	WIT	860 m	MPC · JPL
532680	2013 VH_{25}	—	November 12, 2013	Mount Lemmon	Mount Lemmon Survey	·	1.7 km	MPC · JPL
532681	2013 VR_{25}	—	September 15, 2007	Kitt Peak	Spacewatch	·	2.6 km	MPC · JPL
532682	2013 VS_{25}	—	February 2, 2006	Kitt Peak	Spacewatch	·	1.7 km	MPC · JPL
532683	2013 VT_{25}	—	November 8, 2013	Mount Lemmon	Mount Lemmon Survey	·	3.5 km	MPC · JPL
532684	2013 VV_{25}	—	November 10, 2013	Kitt Peak	Spacewatch	·	3.0 km	MPC · JPL
532685	2013 VW_{25}	—	December 2, 2004	Kitt Peak	Spacewatch	·	2.8 km	MPC · JPL
532686	2013 VX_{25}	—	July 3, 2008	Mount Lemmon	Mount Lemmon Survey	·	1.5 km	MPC · JPL
532687	2013 VY_{25}	—	February 7, 2008	Mount Lemmon	Mount Lemmon Survey	·	2.6 km	MPC · JPL
532688	2013 VZ_{25}	—	November 2, 2013	Kitt Peak	Spacewatch	·	1.3 km	MPC · JPL
532689	2013 VD_{26}	—	October 10, 2008	Mount Lemmon	Mount Lemmon Survey	·	1.6 km	MPC · JPL
532690	2013 VG_{26}	—	November 9, 2013	Haleakala	Pan-STARRS 1	·	1.2 km	MPC · JPL
532691	2013 VL_{26}	—	September 25, 2008	Kitt Peak	Spacewatch	GEF	1.1 km	MPC · JPL
532692	2013 VN_{26}	—	November 2, 2013	Kitt Peak	Spacewatch	·	1.7 km	MPC · JPL
532693	2013 VO_{26}	—	January 17, 2010	Kitt Peak	Spacewatch	EUN	1.0 km	MPC · JPL
532694	2013 VP_{26}	—	October 8, 2008	Mount Lemmon	Mount Lemmon Survey	AGN	1.0 km	MPC · JPL
532695	2013 VR_{26}	—	January 10, 2006	Mount Lemmon	Mount Lemmon Survey	·	800 m	MPC · JPL
532696	2013 VU_{26}	—	September 23, 2008	Mount Lemmon	Mount Lemmon Survey	·	1.6 km	MPC · JPL
532697	2013 VV_{26}	—	November 9, 2013	Haleakala	Pan-STARRS 1	MAR	870 m	MPC · JPL
532698	2013 VW_{26}	—	November 18, 2008	Kitt Peak	Spacewatch	KOR	1.1 km	MPC · JPL
532699	2013 VX_{26}	—	September 28, 2003	Kitt Peak	Spacewatch	·	2.2 km	MPC · JPL
532700	2013 VC_{27}	—	November 1, 2013	Kitt Peak	Spacewatch	·	1.7 km	MPC · JPL

== 532701–532800 ==
back to top

Designation			Discovery			Properties		Ref
Permanent	Provisional	Named after	Date	Site	Discoverer(s)	Category	Diam.	Ref
532701	2013 VE_{27}	—	November 1, 2013	Kitt Peak	Spacewatch	EOS	1.5 km	MPC · JPL
532702	2013 VH_{27}	—	November 1, 2013	Kitt Peak	Spacewatch	·	2.6 km	MPC · JPL
532703	2013 VX_{27}	—	December 4, 2008	Kitt Peak	Spacewatch	·	1.4 km	MPC · JPL
532704	2013 VA_{28}	—	November 2, 2013	Mount Lemmon	Mount Lemmon Survey	·	1.8 km	MPC · JPL
532705	2013 VH_{28}	—	November 2, 2013	Mount Lemmon	Mount Lemmon Survey	·	2.2 km	MPC · JPL
532706	2013 VL_{28}	—	November 4, 2013	Mount Lemmon	Mount Lemmon Survey	·	940 m	MPC · JPL
532707	2013 VN_{28}	—	February 12, 2004	Kitt Peak	Spacewatch	·	1.9 km	MPC · JPL
532708	2013 VR_{28}	—	November 6, 2013	Mount Lemmon	Mount Lemmon Survey	·	2.1 km	MPC · JPL
532709	2013 VB_{30}	—	November 10, 2013	Kitt Peak	Spacewatch	·	2.0 km	MPC · JPL
532710	2013 VG_{30}	—	November 11, 2013	Kitt Peak	Spacewatch	·	1.9 km	MPC · JPL
532711	2013 VM_{30}	—	November 11, 2013	Mount Lemmon	Mount Lemmon Survey	·	1.7 km	MPC · JPL
532712	2013 VV_{30}	—	November 14, 2013	Mount Lemmon	Mount Lemmon Survey	·	3.0 km	MPC · JPL
532713	2013 VY_{30}	—	November 1, 2013	Mount Lemmon	Mount Lemmon Survey	·	1.0 km	MPC · JPL
532714	2013 VB_{31}	—	November 6, 2013	Haleakala	Pan-STARRS 1	·	1.1 km	MPC · JPL
532715	2013 VC_{31}	—	November 6, 2013	Mount Lemmon	Mount Lemmon Survey	EUN	1.4 km	MPC · JPL
532716	2013 VD_{31}	—	November 7, 2013	Kitt Peak	Spacewatch	·	1.5 km	MPC · JPL
532717	2013 VJ_{31}	—	November 2, 2008	Mount Lemmon	Mount Lemmon Survey	·	1.7 km	MPC · JPL
532718	2013 VN_{31}	—	November 8, 2013	Kitt Peak	Spacewatch	·	840 m	MPC · JPL
532719	2013 VQ_{31}	—	November 10, 2013	Mount Lemmon	Mount Lemmon Survey	·	1.7 km	MPC · JPL
532720	2013 VS_{31}	—	November 6, 2013	Haleakala	Pan-STARRS 1	BAR	950 m	MPC · JPL
532721	2013 VW_{31}	—	November 9, 2013	Haleakala	Pan-STARRS 1	·	2.2 km	MPC · JPL
532722	2013 VY_{31}	—	June 3, 2010	WISE	WISE	·	5.0 km	MPC · JPL
532723	2013 WT	—	October 31, 2013	Kitt Peak	Spacewatch	H	490 m	MPC · JPL
532724	2013 WF_{2}	—	September 15, 2007	Mount Lemmon	Mount Lemmon Survey	T_{j} (2.98)	3.1 km	MPC · JPL
532725	2013 WC_{6}	—	October 30, 2013	Haleakala	Pan-STARRS 1	·	1.7 km	MPC · JPL
532726	2013 WX_{6}	—	October 26, 2013	Mount Lemmon	Mount Lemmon Survey	·	1.7 km	MPC · JPL
532727	2013 WH_{7}	—	September 29, 2013	Mount Lemmon	Mount Lemmon Survey	EOS	1.9 km	MPC · JPL
532728	2013 WK_{10}	—	November 8, 1996	Kitt Peak	Spacewatch	·	1.0 km	MPC · JPL
532729	2013 WM_{12}	—	July 31, 2008	Siding Spring	SSS	·	2.2 km	MPC · JPL
532730	2013 WD_{14}	—	November 27, 2013	Haleakala	Pan-STARRS 1	·	1.6 km	MPC · JPL
532731	2013 WR_{14}	—	November 2, 2013	Mount Lemmon	Mount Lemmon Survey	EOS	1.7 km	MPC · JPL
532732	2013 WH_{15}	—	September 3, 2008	Kitt Peak	Spacewatch	·	1.4 km	MPC · JPL
532733	2013 WH_{21}	—	June 22, 1995	Kitt Peak	Spacewatch	·	3.0 km	MPC · JPL
532734	2013 WL_{22}	—	November 6, 2013	Haleakala	Pan-STARRS 1	·	2.3 km	MPC · JPL
532735	2013 WE_{23}	—	November 6, 2013	Haleakala	Pan-STARRS 1	·	1.7 km	MPC · JPL
532736	2013 WL_{23}	—	December 3, 2008	Kitt Peak	Spacewatch	·	2.0 km	MPC · JPL
532737	2013 WA_{25}	—	April 28, 2012	Mount Lemmon	Mount Lemmon Survey	H	420 m	MPC · JPL
532738	2013 WD_{25}	—	April 29, 2012	Kitt Peak	Spacewatch	H	470 m	MPC · JPL
532739	2013 WE_{25}	—	November 10, 2013	Mount Lemmon	Mount Lemmon Survey	H	550 m	MPC · JPL
532740	2013 WG_{26}	—	July 13, 2013	Haleakala	Pan-STARRS 1	·	3.2 km	MPC · JPL
532741	2013 WH_{26}	—	November 11, 2013	Mount Lemmon	Mount Lemmon Survey	H	420 m	MPC · JPL
532742	2013 WJ_{27}	—	March 18, 2010	Kitt Peak	Spacewatch	·	2.9 km	MPC · JPL
532743	2013 WJ_{28}	—	April 2, 2010	WISE	WISE	ADE	1.6 km	MPC · JPL
532744	2013 WO_{28}	—	October 30, 2013	Kitt Peak	Spacewatch	EOS	2.0 km	MPC · JPL
532745	2013 WP_{28}	—	August 30, 2011	Haleakala	Pan-STARRS 1	L5	7.3 km	MPC · JPL
532746	2013 WU_{30}	—	November 1, 2013	Haleakala	Pan-STARRS 1	·	2.2 km	MPC · JPL
532747	2013 WD_{32}	—	November 27, 2000	Kitt Peak	Spacewatch	H	450 m	MPC · JPL
532748	2013 WS_{32}	—	December 9, 2004	Kitt Peak	Spacewatch	GEF	1.0 km	MPC · JPL
532749	2013 WE_{33}	—	January 19, 2004	Kitt Peak	Spacewatch	·	1.2 km	MPC · JPL
532750	2013 WE_{35}	—	November 26, 2013	Haleakala	Pan-STARRS 1	·	2.0 km	MPC · JPL
532751	2013 WU_{37}	—	April 20, 2007	Mount Lemmon	Mount Lemmon Survey	·	1.5 km	MPC · JPL
532752	2013 WZ_{37}	—	November 27, 2013	Haleakala	Pan-STARRS 1	·	1.6 km	MPC · JPL
532753	2013 WZ_{38}	—	December 20, 2008	La Sagra	OAM	·	2.3 km	MPC · JPL
532754	2013 WK_{41}	—	September 3, 2008	Kitt Peak	Spacewatch	(13314)	1.4 km	MPC · JPL
532755	2013 WF_{42}	—	November 9, 2008	Kitt Peak	Spacewatch	KOR	1.0 km	MPC · JPL
532756	2013 WJ_{43}	—	November 18, 2008	Catalina	CSS	·	1.7 km	MPC · JPL
532757	2013 WQ_{44}	—	April 20, 2012	Siding Spring	SSS	H	500 m	MPC · JPL
532758	2013 WC_{45}	—	March 26, 2012	Mount Lemmon	Mount Lemmon Survey	H	320 m	MPC · JPL
532759	2013 WL_{45}	—	November 10, 2013	Mount Lemmon	Mount Lemmon Survey	H	430 m	MPC · JPL
532760	2013 WA_{46}	—	April 13, 2011	Haleakala	Pan-STARRS 1	GAL	1.7 km	MPC · JPL
532761	2013 WJ_{47}	—	July 18, 2013	Haleakala	Pan-STARRS 1	·	2.5 km	MPC · JPL
532762	2013 WT_{47}	—	October 23, 2013	Mount Lemmon	Mount Lemmon Survey	·	1.3 km	MPC · JPL
532763	2013 WX_{48}	—	October 28, 2013	Mount Lemmon	Mount Lemmon Survey	·	1.9 km	MPC · JPL
532764	2013 WD_{53}	—	October 3, 2002	Campo Imperatore	CINEOS	·	2.1 km	MPC · JPL
532765	2013 WQ_{53}	—	August 21, 2012	Haleakala	Pan-STARRS 1	EOS	1.7 km	MPC · JPL
532766	2013 WY_{53}	—	November 25, 2013	Haleakala	Pan-STARRS 1	·	2.0 km	MPC · JPL
532767	2013 WB_{55}	—	February 25, 2009	Siding Spring	SSS	T_{j} (2.98)	2.5 km	MPC · JPL
532768	2013 WN_{55}	—	October 14, 2013	Mount Lemmon	Mount Lemmon Survey	·	3.0 km	MPC · JPL
532769	2013 WW_{58}	—	November 11, 2013	Kitt Peak	Spacewatch	·	1.4 km	MPC · JPL
532770	2013 WZ_{58}	—	April 6, 2011	Kitt Peak	Spacewatch	·	2.3 km	MPC · JPL
532771	2013 WD_{59}	—	November 7, 2013	Kitt Peak	Spacewatch	·	2.4 km	MPC · JPL
532772	2013 WL_{59}	—	October 9, 2013	Mount Lemmon	Mount Lemmon Survey	EOS	2.0 km	MPC · JPL
532773	2013 WM_{59}	—	November 12, 2013	Kitt Peak	Spacewatch	·	1.5 km	MPC · JPL
532774	2013 WA_{61}	—	November 27, 2013	Haleakala	Pan-STARRS 1	·	1.1 km	MPC · JPL
532775	2013 WQ_{63}	—	July 14, 2013	Haleakala	Pan-STARRS 1	·	3.2 km	MPC · JPL
532776	2013 WU_{63}	—	October 23, 2013	Haleakala	Pan-STARRS 1	EUN	930 m	MPC · JPL
532777	2013 WL_{64}	—	October 20, 1999	Socorro	LINEAR	·	2.2 km	MPC · JPL
532778	2013 WO_{66}	—	May 1, 2010	WISE	WISE	DOR	2.9 km	MPC · JPL
532779	2013 WD_{72}	—	January 7, 2006	Kitt Peak	Spacewatch	·	740 m	MPC · JPL
532780	2013 WY_{72}	—	November 2, 2013	Mount Lemmon	Mount Lemmon Survey	·	1.4 km	MPC · JPL
532781	2013 WQ_{74}	—	October 26, 2013	Mount Lemmon	Mount Lemmon Survey	AEO	930 m	MPC · JPL
532782	2013 WW_{75}	—	November 8, 2013	Mount Lemmon	Mount Lemmon Survey	VER	2.2 km	MPC · JPL
532783	2013 WL_{78}	—	October 26, 2008	Mount Lemmon	Mount Lemmon Survey	·	2.7 km	MPC · JPL
532784	2013 WG_{79}	—	October 26, 2013	Catalina	CSS	·	1.8 km	MPC · JPL
532785	2013 WH_{80}	—	August 21, 2012	Haleakala	Pan-STARRS 1	EOS	1.9 km	MPC · JPL
532786	2013 WZ_{80}	—	November 26, 2013	Mount Lemmon	Mount Lemmon Survey	·	2.7 km	MPC · JPL
532787	2013 WO_{81}	—	November 24, 2008	Mount Lemmon	Mount Lemmon Survey	·	1.6 km	MPC · JPL
532788	2013 WX_{82}	—	December 30, 2008	Kitt Peak	Spacewatch	·	1.9 km	MPC · JPL
532789	2013 WZ_{82}	—	January 28, 2006	Kitt Peak	Spacewatch	·	920 m	MPC · JPL
532790	2013 WB_{84}	—	January 29, 2010	WISE	WISE	·	3.4 km	MPC · JPL
532791	2013 WF_{86}	—	November 27, 2013	Haleakala	Pan-STARRS 1	·	2.3 km	MPC · JPL
532792	2013 WK_{86}	—	October 27, 2013	Catalina	CSS	·	2.0 km	MPC · JPL
532793	2013 WU_{89}	—	January 23, 2006	Mount Lemmon	Mount Lemmon Survey	·	1.2 km	MPC · JPL
532794	2013 WR_{91}	—	November 28, 2013	Mount Lemmon	Mount Lemmon Survey	EOS	1.5 km	MPC · JPL
532795	2013 WV_{91}	—	May 16, 2010	WISE	WISE	·	1.8 km	MPC · JPL
532796	2013 WV_{93}	—	December 30, 2008	Mount Lemmon	Mount Lemmon Survey	·	1.6 km	MPC · JPL
532797	2013 WZ_{93}	—	March 13, 2011	Mount Lemmon	Mount Lemmon Survey	·	1.2 km	MPC · JPL
532798	2013 WP_{96}	—	October 26, 2009	Kitt Peak	Spacewatch	·	1.2 km	MPC · JPL
532799	2013 WX_{98}	—	November 10, 2013	Kitt Peak	Spacewatch	EOS	1.5 km	MPC · JPL
532800	2013 WB_{103}	—	July 16, 2013	Haleakala	Pan-STARRS 1	LIX	3.6 km	MPC · JPL

== 532801–532900 ==
back to top

Designation			Discovery			Properties		Ref
Permanent	Provisional	Named after	Date	Site	Discoverer(s)	Category	Diam.	Ref
532801	2013 WE_{103}	—	October 6, 2008	Mount Lemmon	Mount Lemmon Survey	·	1.9 km	MPC · JPL
532802	2013 WP_{104}	—	October 7, 2007	Kitt Peak	Spacewatch	·	3.1 km	MPC · JPL
532803	2013 WZ_{104}	—	November 23, 2008	Kitt Peak	Spacewatch	·	1.3 km	MPC · JPL
532804	2013 WN_{107}	—	November 29, 2013	Haleakala	Pan-STARRS 1	·	2.8 km	MPC · JPL
532805	2013 WB_{109}	—	July 13, 2013	Haleakala	Pan-STARRS 1	·	4.3 km	MPC · JPL
532806	2013 WF_{109}	—	May 16, 2010	WISE	WISE	·	1.9 km	MPC · JPL
532807	2013 WV_{109}	—	February 15, 2010	Mount Lemmon	Mount Lemmon Survey	·	1.4 km	MPC · JPL
532808	2013 WG_{110}	—	October 25, 2005	Catalina	CSS	H	430 m	MPC · JPL
532809	2013 WA_{111}	—	November 27, 2013	Haleakala	Pan-STARRS 1	·	1.5 km	MPC · JPL
532810	2013 WB_{111}	—	October 6, 2007	Kitt Peak	Spacewatch	·	2.9 km	MPC · JPL
532811	2013 WD_{111}	—	November 4, 2007	Mount Lemmon	Mount Lemmon Survey	·	2.8 km	MPC · JPL
532812	2013 WM_{111}	—	December 17, 2009	Mount Lemmon	Mount Lemmon Survey	·	1.5 km	MPC · JPL
532813	2013 WN_{111}	—	September 24, 2008	Mount Lemmon	Mount Lemmon Survey	KOR	1.3 km	MPC · JPL
532814	2013 WP_{111}	—	September 29, 2008	Mount Lemmon	Mount Lemmon Survey	·	1.8 km	MPC · JPL
532815	2013 WA_{112}	—	December 31, 2008	Catalina	CSS	EOS	1.9 km	MPC · JPL
532816	2013 WC_{112}	—	November 27, 2013	Haleakala	Pan-STARRS 1	·	1.6 km	MPC · JPL
532817	2013 WF_{112}	—	November 27, 2013	Haleakala	Pan-STARRS 1	·	1.0 km	MPC · JPL
532818	2013 WG_{112}	—	November 27, 2013	Haleakala	Pan-STARRS 1	·	1.8 km	MPC · JPL
532819	2013 WT_{112}	—	November 28, 2013	Haleakala	Pan-STARRS 1	·	1.7 km	MPC · JPL
532820	2013 WB_{113}	—	November 28, 2013	Mount Lemmon	Mount Lemmon Survey	·	1.9 km	MPC · JPL
532821	2013 WD_{113}	—	June 4, 2011	Mount Lemmon	Mount Lemmon Survey	BRA	1.7 km	MPC · JPL
532822	2013 WG_{113}	—	November 29, 2013	Kitt Peak	Spacewatch	·	1.1 km	MPC · JPL
532823	2013 WJ_{113}	—	November 29, 2013	Mount Lemmon	Mount Lemmon Survey	·	1.7 km	MPC · JPL
532824	2013 WT_{113}	—	November 27, 2013	Haleakala	Pan-STARRS 1	(5)	940 m	MPC · JPL
532825	2013 WV_{113}	—	November 28, 2013	Mount Lemmon	Mount Lemmon Survey	MAR	1.1 km	MPC · JPL
532826	2013 WB_{114}	—	December 17, 2009	Mount Lemmon	Mount Lemmon Survey	·	1.2 km	MPC · JPL
532827	2013 WC_{114}	—	November 27, 2013	Haleakala	Pan-STARRS 1	EOS	1.6 km	MPC · JPL
532828	2013 WD_{114}	—	November 28, 2013	Mount Lemmon	Mount Lemmon Survey	·	2.0 km	MPC · JPL
532829	2013 XA	—	November 12, 2013	Mount Lemmon	Mount Lemmon Survey	H	480 m	MPC · JPL
532830	2013 XE_{1}	—	August 25, 2012	Kitt Peak	Spacewatch	·	2.6 km	MPC · JPL
532831	2013 XW_{1}	—	October 6, 2012	Haleakala	Pan-STARRS 1	·	2.7 km	MPC · JPL
532832	2013 XX_{1}	—	September 22, 2012	Kitt Peak	Spacewatch	·	2.4 km	MPC · JPL
532833	2013 XC_{6}	—	November 21, 2008	Kitt Peak	Spacewatch	·	1.3 km	MPC · JPL
532834	2013 XZ_{6}	—	January 5, 2003	Socorro	LINEAR	H	650 m	MPC · JPL
532835	2013 XO_{7}	—	September 24, 2000	Socorro	LINEAR	BRG	1.3 km	MPC · JPL
532836	2013 XX_{7}	—	January 23, 2010	WISE	WISE	EOS	4.6 km	MPC · JPL
532837	2013 XP_{8}	—	December 8, 2004	Socorro	LINEAR	·	1.5 km	MPC · JPL
532838	2013 XV_{9}	—	December 6, 2008	Mount Lemmon	Mount Lemmon Survey	H	480 m	MPC · JPL
532839	2013 XY_{11}	—	May 12, 2010	Mount Lemmon	Mount Lemmon Survey	·	2.8 km	MPC · JPL
532840	2013 XQ_{12}	—	April 26, 2012	Haleakala	Pan-STARRS 1	H	540 m	MPC · JPL
532841	2013 XS_{12}	—	August 10, 2010	Kitt Peak	Spacewatch	·	450 m	MPC · JPL
532842	2013 XB_{13}	—	March 20, 2007	Kitt Peak	Spacewatch	·	1.7 km	MPC · JPL
532843	2013 XO_{13}	—	December 21, 2008	Mount Lemmon	Mount Lemmon Survey	·	1.5 km	MPC · JPL
532844	2013 XC_{17}	—	October 10, 2007	Kitt Peak	Spacewatch	·	2.7 km	MPC · JPL
532845	2013 XL_{17}	—	May 24, 2011	Mount Lemmon	Mount Lemmon Survey	HNS	1.1 km	MPC · JPL
532846	2013 XT_{17}	—	August 26, 2012	Haleakala	Pan-STARRS 1	HYG	2.6 km	MPC · JPL
532847	2013 XD_{18}	—	November 27, 2013	Haleakala	Pan-STARRS 1	H	480 m	MPC · JPL
532848	2013 XG_{19}	—	December 6, 2013	Haleakala	Pan-STARRS 1	·	1.8 km	MPC · JPL
532849	2013 XH_{20}	—	December 11, 2013	Haleakala	Pan-STARRS 1	GAL	1.2 km	MPC · JPL
532850	2013 XX_{20}	—	October 30, 2013	Haleakala	Pan-STARRS 1	·	1.9 km	MPC · JPL
532851	2013 XF_{21}	—	December 12, 2013	Mount Lemmon	Mount Lemmon Survey	H	520 m	MPC · JPL
532852	2013 XX_{22}	—	November 5, 2007	Kitt Peak	Spacewatch	·	3.1 km	MPC · JPL
532853	2013 XA_{24}	—	January 18, 2009	Catalina	CSS	·	2.4 km	MPC · JPL
532854	2013 XK_{26}	—	December 30, 2005	Mount Lemmon	Mount Lemmon Survey	H	410 m	MPC · JPL
532855	2013 XQ_{26}	—	December 4, 2013	Haleakala	Pan-STARRS 1	·	2.2 km	MPC · JPL
532856	2013 XZ_{26}	—	December 20, 2009	Mount Lemmon	Mount Lemmon Survey	MAR	850 m	MPC · JPL
532857	2013 XJ_{27}	—	February 15, 2010	Mount Lemmon	Mount Lemmon Survey	·	1.5 km	MPC · JPL
532858	2013 XO_{27}	—	December 10, 2013	Mount Lemmon	Mount Lemmon Survey	·	1.6 km	MPC · JPL
532859	2013 XP_{27}	—	December 10, 2013	Catalina	CSS	·	2.6 km	MPC · JPL
532860	2013 XQ_{27}	—	December 10, 2013	Haleakala	Pan-STARRS 1	·	2.0 km	MPC · JPL
532861	2013 XU_{27}	—	September 15, 2007	Catalina	CSS	·	2.9 km	MPC · JPL
532862	2013 XX_{27}	—	December 16, 2007	Catalina	CSS	·	2.2 km	MPC · JPL
532863	2013 XD_{28}	—	November 28, 2013	Catalina	CSS	·	1.4 km	MPC · JPL
532864	2013 XE_{28}	—	December 10, 2013	Mount Lemmon	Mount Lemmon Survey	KOR	1.4 km	MPC · JPL
532865	2013 XF_{28}	—	January 28, 2010	WISE	WISE	·	4.6 km	MPC · JPL
532866	2013 YY_{3}	—	September 15, 2012	Mount Lemmon	Mount Lemmon Survey	·	3.1 km	MPC · JPL
532867	2013 YC_{8}	—	March 13, 2007	Mount Lemmon	Mount Lemmon Survey	·	1.1 km	MPC · JPL
532868	2013 YT_{8}	—	September 7, 2008	Mount Lemmon	Mount Lemmon Survey	·	930 m	MPC · JPL
532869	2013 YE_{9}	—	November 1, 2008	Mount Lemmon	Mount Lemmon Survey	·	1.4 km	MPC · JPL
532870	2013 YP_{9}	—	December 29, 2008	Kitt Peak	Spacewatch	·	1.3 km	MPC · JPL
532871	2013 YZ_{9}	—	December 24, 2013	Mount Lemmon	Mount Lemmon Survey	·	2.0 km	MPC · JPL
532872	2013 YJ_{11}	—	December 24, 2013	Mount Lemmon	Mount Lemmon Survey	·	2.3 km	MPC · JPL
532873	2013 YU_{13}	—	December 25, 2013	Mount Lemmon	Mount Lemmon Survey	H	500 m	MPC · JPL
532874	2013 YZ_{13}	—	December 24, 2013	Catalina	CSS	AMO	310 m	MPC · JPL
532875	2013 YJ_{15}	—	January 14, 2010	WISE	WISE	·	2.8 km	MPC · JPL
532876	2013 YL_{19}	—	November 27, 2013	Haleakala	Pan-STARRS 1	·	1.6 km	MPC · JPL
532877	2013 YD_{20}	—	December 25, 2013	Mount Lemmon	Mount Lemmon Survey	JUN	990 m	MPC · JPL
532878	2013 YK_{20}	—	December 4, 2013	Haleakala	Pan-STARRS 1	EOS	2.1 km	MPC · JPL
532879	2013 YK_{21}	—	December 26, 2013	Haleakala	Pan-STARRS 1	H	610 m	MPC · JPL
532880	2013 YV_{21}	—	December 5, 2008	Kitt Peak	Spacewatch	·	1.9 km	MPC · JPL
532881	2013 YH_{23}	—	December 4, 2008	Kitt Peak	Spacewatch	KOR	1.5 km	MPC · JPL
532882	2013 YR_{23}	—	November 11, 2009	Mount Lemmon	Mount Lemmon Survey	·	930 m	MPC · JPL
532883	2013 YX_{23}	—	April 25, 2007	Kitt Peak	Spacewatch	HNS	1.0 km	MPC · JPL
532884	2013 YF_{24}	—	October 26, 2013	Kitt Peak	Spacewatch	·	2.8 km	MPC · JPL
532885	2013 YP_{24}	—	September 3, 2007	Mount Lemmon	Mount Lemmon Survey	·	2.4 km	MPC · JPL
532886	2013 YO_{25}	—	January 18, 1998	Kitt Peak	Spacewatch	·	2.8 km	MPC · JPL
532887	2013 YR_{25}	—	June 8, 2010	WISE	WISE	·	3.2 km	MPC · JPL
532888	2013 YH_{27}	—	December 10, 2004	Kitt Peak	Spacewatch	·	1.3 km	MPC · JPL
532889	2013 YH_{28}	—	October 19, 2007	Catalina	CSS	·	2.2 km	MPC · JPL
532890	2013 YK_{30}	—	September 20, 2012	Mount Lemmon	Mount Lemmon Survey	·	3.0 km	MPC · JPL
532891	2013 YW_{30}	—	November 28, 2013	Mount Lemmon	Mount Lemmon Survey	EOS	1.9 km	MPC · JPL
532892	2013 YE_{32}	—	December 25, 2013	Mount Lemmon	Mount Lemmon Survey	·	1.8 km	MPC · JPL
532893	2013 YR_{32}	—	December 25, 2013	Mount Lemmon	Mount Lemmon Survey	·	1.4 km	MPC · JPL
532894	2013 YF_{33}	—	September 15, 2006	Kitt Peak	Spacewatch	·	3.6 km	MPC · JPL
532895	2013 YP_{33}	—	December 26, 2013	Mount Lemmon	Mount Lemmon Survey	·	2.9 km	MPC · JPL
532896	2013 YD_{34}	—	December 26, 2013	Mount Lemmon	Mount Lemmon Survey	HNS	1.0 km	MPC · JPL
532897	2013 YF_{34}	—	December 26, 2013	Mount Lemmon	Mount Lemmon Survey	·	2.0 km	MPC · JPL
532898	2013 YR_{34}	—	October 9, 2013	Mount Lemmon	Mount Lemmon Survey	·	1.3 km	MPC · JPL
532899	2013 YC_{35}	—	October 26, 2013	Mount Lemmon	Mount Lemmon Survey	·	2.5 km	MPC · JPL
532900	2013 YT_{35}	—	April 17, 2010	WISE	WISE	·	2.2 km	MPC · JPL

== 532901–533000 ==
back to top

Designation			Discovery			Properties		Ref
Permanent	Provisional	Named after	Date	Site	Discoverer(s)	Category	Diam.	Ref
532901	2013 YJ_{39}	—	June 24, 2010	WISE	WISE	·	3.2 km	MPC · JPL
532902	2013 YV_{39}	—	December 29, 2008	Kitt Peak	Spacewatch	H	340 m	MPC · JPL
532903	2013 YK_{41}	—	November 27, 2013	Haleakala	Pan-STARRS 1	·	1.9 km	MPC · JPL
532904	2013 YK_{43}	—	December 13, 2013	Mount Lemmon	Mount Lemmon Survey	·	2.7 km	MPC · JPL
532905	2013 YP_{43}	—	December 5, 2008	Kitt Peak	Spacewatch	·	1.5 km	MPC · JPL
532906	2013 YE_{45}	—	December 3, 2008	Mount Lemmon	Mount Lemmon Survey	·	1.7 km	MPC · JPL
532907	2013 YP_{48}	—	October 10, 2007	Mount Lemmon	Mount Lemmon Survey	·	2.4 km	MPC · JPL
532908	2013 YA_{49}	—	November 9, 2013	Mount Lemmon	Mount Lemmon Survey	·	2.8 km	MPC · JPL
532909	2013 YV_{50}	—	May 6, 2003	Kitt Peak	Spacewatch	·	2.2 km	MPC · JPL
532910	2013 YO_{51}	—	December 1, 2008	Kitt Peak	Spacewatch	·	1.8 km	MPC · JPL
532911	2013 YH_{52}	—	April 21, 2012	Mount Lemmon	Mount Lemmon Survey	T_{j} (2.99) · EUP	4.2 km	MPC · JPL
532912	2013 YS_{52}	—	January 26, 2006	Kitt Peak	Spacewatch	·	870 m	MPC · JPL
532913	2013 YH_{53}	—	September 12, 2007	Mount Lemmon	Mount Lemmon Survey	·	2.3 km	MPC · JPL
532914	2013 YU_{54}	—	March 5, 2009	Siding Spring	SSS	·	3.1 km	MPC · JPL
532915	2013 YE_{55}	—	December 25, 2013	Mount Lemmon	Mount Lemmon Survey	·	2.1 km	MPC · JPL
532916	2013 YG_{55}	—	November 11, 2013	Mount Lemmon	Mount Lemmon Survey	·	1.8 km	MPC · JPL
532917	2013 YO_{55}	—	December 25, 2013	Haleakala	Pan-STARRS 1	H	450 m	MPC · JPL
532918	2013 YX_{55}	—	November 28, 2013	Kitt Peak	Spacewatch	·	2.9 km	MPC · JPL
532919	2013 YF_{59}	—	November 18, 2008	Kitt Peak	Spacewatch	·	1.7 km	MPC · JPL
532920	2013 YX_{60}	—	October 22, 2012	Haleakala	Pan-STARRS 1	·	2.4 km	MPC · JPL
532921	2013 YE_{64}	—	August 25, 2012	Catalina	CSS	·	3.4 km	MPC · JPL
532922	2013 YN_{65}	—	October 20, 2007	Mount Lemmon	Mount Lemmon Survey	·	2.5 km	MPC · JPL
532923	2013 YS_{69}	—	December 30, 2013	Mount Lemmon	Mount Lemmon Survey	·	2.9 km	MPC · JPL
532924	2013 YT_{69}	—	December 30, 2013	Mount Lemmon	Mount Lemmon Survey	·	2.0 km	MPC · JPL
532925	2013 YC_{73}	—	March 4, 2010	WISE	WISE	·	4.8 km	MPC · JPL
532926	2013 YN_{73}	—	October 9, 2012	Mount Lemmon	Mount Lemmon Survey	·	2.1 km	MPC · JPL
532927	2013 YT_{73}	—	August 26, 2012	Haleakala	Pan-STARRS 1	·	2.7 km	MPC · JPL
532928	2013 YE_{74}	—	December 27, 2000	Kitt Peak	Spacewatch	H	560 m	MPC · JPL
532929	2013 YG_{74}	—	October 18, 2007	Mount Lemmon	Mount Lemmon Survey	·	1.8 km	MPC · JPL
532930	2013 YQ_{76}	—	December 27, 2013	Kitt Peak	Spacewatch	·	2.6 km	MPC · JPL
532931	2013 YY_{77}	—	August 10, 2012	Kitt Peak	Spacewatch	·	2.7 km	MPC · JPL
532932	2013 YD_{78}	—	December 11, 2013	Mount Lemmon	Mount Lemmon Survey	·	3.3 km	MPC · JPL
532933	2013 YY_{83}	—	May 12, 2010	Mount Lemmon	Mount Lemmon Survey	·	2.6 km	MPC · JPL
532934	2013 YL_{88}	—	April 7, 2010	Catalina	CSS	JUN	900 m	MPC · JPL
532935	2013 YV_{88}	—	December 28, 2013	Kitt Peak	Spacewatch	H	510 m	MPC · JPL
532936	2013 YY_{90}	—	January 20, 2001	Kitt Peak	Spacewatch	H	490 m	MPC · JPL
532937	2013 YM_{94}	—	September 10, 2007	Mount Lemmon	Mount Lemmon Survey	·	1.9 km	MPC · JPL
532938	2013 YQ_{94}	—	December 13, 2013	Mount Lemmon	Mount Lemmon Survey	·	1.7 km	MPC · JPL
532939	2013 YR_{94}	—	December 30, 2013	Kitt Peak	Spacewatch	·	1.8 km	MPC · JPL
532940	2013 YC_{95}	—	December 30, 2013	Kitt Peak	Spacewatch	·	2.8 km	MPC · JPL
532941	2013 YM_{95}	—	February 13, 2010	Mount Lemmon	Mount Lemmon Survey	MIS	1.9 km	MPC · JPL
532942	2013 YP_{95}	—	February 14, 2010	Kitt Peak	Spacewatch	·	1.3 km	MPC · JPL
532943	2013 YR_{95}	—	December 11, 2013	Mount Lemmon	Mount Lemmon Survey	·	1.2 km	MPC · JPL
532944	2013 YZ_{95}	—	August 5, 2004	Palomar	NEAT	H	550 m	MPC · JPL
532945	2013 YS_{98}	—	October 8, 2007	Kitt Peak	Spacewatch	·	2.1 km	MPC · JPL
532946	2013 YK_{99}	—	November 6, 2013	Mount Lemmon	Mount Lemmon Survey	MAR	1.1 km	MPC · JPL
532947	2013 YV_{103}	—	May 31, 2011	Mount Lemmon	Mount Lemmon Survey	·	3.2 km	MPC · JPL
532948	2013 YH_{106}	—	December 19, 2004	Mount Lemmon	Mount Lemmon Survey	·	1.7 km	MPC · JPL
532949	2013 YF_{110}	—	February 2, 2005	Catalina	CSS	·	2.1 km	MPC · JPL
532950	2013 YL_{110}	—	June 21, 2010	WISE	WISE	·	2.2 km	MPC · JPL
532951	2013 YU_{110}	—	September 23, 2008	Catalina	CSS	·	1.9 km	MPC · JPL
532952	2013 YX_{110}	—	October 19, 2012	Mount Lemmon	Mount Lemmon Survey	(43176)	3.0 km	MPC · JPL
532953	2013 YC_{112}	—	February 3, 2009	Kitt Peak	Spacewatch	·	2.0 km	MPC · JPL
532954	2013 YP_{113}	—	February 9, 2010	WISE	WISE	·	3.3 km	MPC · JPL
532955	2013 YP_{114}	—	September 14, 2010	Catalina	CSS	H	400 m	MPC · JPL
532956	2013 YM_{117}	—	October 18, 2012	Haleakala	Pan-STARRS 1	THM	2.0 km	MPC · JPL
532957	2013 YD_{119}	—	January 8, 2006	Mount Lemmon	Mount Lemmon Survey	·	1.2 km	MPC · JPL
532958	2013 YX_{119}	—	December 11, 2013	Mount Lemmon	Mount Lemmon Survey	H	460 m	MPC · JPL
532959	2013 YU_{120}	—	November 6, 2008	Mount Lemmon	Mount Lemmon Survey	·	1.2 km	MPC · JPL
532960	2013 YD_{122}	—	December 11, 2013	Haleakala	Pan-STARRS 1	·	1.8 km	MPC · JPL
532961	2013 YM_{122}	—	August 26, 2012	Haleakala	Pan-STARRS 1	THM	1.6 km	MPC · JPL
532962	2013 YA_{123}	—	June 3, 2005	Kitt Peak	Spacewatch	·	3.2 km	MPC · JPL
532963	2013 YF_{123}	—	December 30, 2013	Kitt Peak	Spacewatch	TIR	2.5 km	MPC · JPL
532964	2013 YE_{125}	—	March 12, 2010	Mount Lemmon	Mount Lemmon Survey	·	1.3 km	MPC · JPL
532965	2013 YF_{128}	—	November 20, 2008	Kitt Peak	Spacewatch	·	1.9 km	MPC · JPL
532966	2013 YG_{131}	—	December 4, 2013	Haleakala	Pan-STARRS 1	·	3.8 km	MPC · JPL
532967	2013 YN_{132}	—	April 29, 2010	WISE	WISE	·	2.4 km	MPC · JPL
532968	2013 YV_{133}	—	December 6, 2013	Haleakala	Pan-STARRS 1	·	2.0 km	MPC · JPL
532969	2013 YS_{135}	—	April 26, 2010	Mount Lemmon	Mount Lemmon Survey	·	2.4 km	MPC · JPL
532970	2013 YR_{136}	—	January 16, 2009	Kitt Peak	Spacewatch	·	2.9 km	MPC · JPL
532971	2013 YV_{139}	—	April 21, 2010	WISE	WISE	·	2.9 km	MPC · JPL
532972	2013 YB_{143}	—	November 28, 2013	Mount Lemmon	Mount Lemmon Survey	·	2.0 km	MPC · JPL
532973	2013 YS_{151}	—	December 28, 2013	Kitt Peak	Spacewatch	·	2.3 km	MPC · JPL
532974	2013 YV_{151}	—	September 21, 2011	Mount Lemmon	Mount Lemmon Survey	·	2.0 km	MPC · JPL
532975	2013 YC_{152}	—	January 13, 2003	Kitt Peak	Spacewatch	·	3.5 km	MPC · JPL
532976	2013 YE_{152}	—	September 24, 2007	Kitt Peak	Spacewatch	·	2.0 km	MPC · JPL
532977	2013 YG_{152}	—	December 25, 2013	Mount Lemmon	Mount Lemmon Survey	·	2.2 km	MPC · JPL
532978	2013 YJ_{152}	—	March 10, 2005	Mount Lemmon	Mount Lemmon Survey	HOF	2.7 km	MPC · JPL
532979	2013 YK_{152}	—	October 21, 2007	Mount Lemmon	Mount Lemmon Survey	HYG	2.3 km	MPC · JPL
532980	2013 YL_{152}	—	October 15, 2012	Haleakala	Pan-STARRS 1	·	1.6 km	MPC · JPL
532981	2013 YN_{152}	—	November 8, 2007	Kitt Peak	Spacewatch	·	2.0 km	MPC · JPL
532982	2013 YP_{152}	—	February 27, 2009	Kitt Peak	Spacewatch	·	1.8 km	MPC · JPL
532983	2013 YS_{152}	—	November 17, 2007	Mount Lemmon	Mount Lemmon Survey	·	2.2 km	MPC · JPL
532984	2013 YA_{153}	—	December 30, 2013	Kitt Peak	Spacewatch	·	3.0 km	MPC · JPL
532985	2013 YH_{153}	—	October 3, 2003	Kitt Peak	Spacewatch	·	1.7 km	MPC · JPL
532986	2013 YJ_{153}	—	November 19, 2003	Kitt Peak	Spacewatch	·	1.6 km	MPC · JPL
532987	2013 YK_{153}	—	December 29, 2013	Haleakala	Pan-STARRS 1	EUN	1.1 km	MPC · JPL
532988	2013 YM_{153}	—	October 8, 2012	Haleakala	Pan-STARRS 1	·	1.6 km	MPC · JPL
532989	2013 YN_{153}	—	February 27, 2006	Kitt Peak	Spacewatch	·	1.6 km	MPC · JPL
532990	2013 YP_{153}	—	April 8, 2006	Catalina	CSS	·	1.7 km	MPC · JPL
532991	2013 YT_{153}	—	October 23, 2012	Haleakala	Pan-STARRS 1	·	3.4 km	MPC · JPL
532992	2013 YX_{153}	—	May 11, 2005	Kitt Peak	Spacewatch	EOS	2.0 km	MPC · JPL
532993	2013 YZ_{153}	—	December 25, 2013	Mount Lemmon	Mount Lemmon Survey	·	2.0 km	MPC · JPL
532994	2013 YB_{154}	—	December 25, 2013	Kitt Peak	Spacewatch	·	2.2 km	MPC · JPL
532995	2013 YO_{154}	—	January 29, 2009	Mount Lemmon	Mount Lemmon Survey	·	2.1 km	MPC · JPL
532996	2013 YS_{154}	—	December 31, 2013	Kitt Peak	Spacewatch	·	2.5 km	MPC · JPL
532997	2013 YJ_{155}	—	December 29, 2013	Haleakala	Pan-STARRS 1	·	1.6 km	MPC · JPL
532998	2014 AO	—	November 13, 2007	Mount Lemmon	Mount Lemmon Survey	·	2.6 km	MPC · JPL
532999	2014 AW	—	November 8, 2007	Kitt Peak	Spacewatch	·	2.6 km	MPC · JPL
533000	2014 AD_{4}	—	October 31, 2013	Mount Lemmon	Mount Lemmon Survey	TIR	2.4 km	MPC · JPL

back to top

== Meaning of names ==
As minor planet discoveries are confirmed, they are given a permanent number by the IAU's Minor Planet Center (MPC), and the discoverers can then submit names for them, following the IAU's naming conventions. The list below concerns those minor planets in the specified number-range that have received names, and explains the meanings of those names.

Official naming citations of newly named small Solar System bodies are approved and published in a bulletin by IAU's Working Group for Small Bodies Nomenclature (WGSBN). Before May 2021, citations were published in MPC's Minor Planet Circulars for many decades. Recent citations can also be found on the JPL Small-Body Database (SBDB). Until his death in 2016, German astronomer Lutz D. Schmadel compiled these citations into the Dictionary of Minor Planet Names (DMP) and regularly updated the collection.

Based on Paul Herget's The Names of the Minor Planets, Schmadel also researched the unclear origin of numerous asteroids, most of which had been named prior to World War II. This article incorporates text from this source, which is in the public domain: SBDB New namings may only be added to this list below after official publication as the preannouncement of names is condemned. The WGSBN publishes a comprehensive guideline for the naming rules of non-cometary small Solar System bodies.

Named minor planet	Provisional	This minor planet was named for...	Ref · Catalog
532037 Chiminigagua	2013 FY_{27}	Chiminigagua is the creator of light and the world of the Muisca people that inhabit the Andes mountains in the central part of Colombia. Before Chiminigagua, there was only darkness.	IAU · 532037
