= List of minor planets: 701001–702000 =

The following is a partial list of minor planets, running from minor-planet number 701001 through 702000, inclusive. The primary data for this and other partial lists is based on JPL's "Small-Body Orbital Elements" and data available from the Minor Planet Center. Critical list information is also provided by the MPC, unless otherwise specified from Lowell Observatory. A detailed description of the table's columns and additional sources are given on the main page including a complete list of every page in this series, and a statistical break-up on the dynamical classification of minor planets.

Also see the summary list of all named bodies in numerical and alphabetical order, and the corresponding naming citations for the number range of this particular list. New namings may only be added to this list after official publication, as the preannouncement of names is condemned by the Working Group for Small Bodies Nomenclature of the International Astronomical Union.

Near-Earth obj.	MBA (inner)	MBA (outer)	Centaur
Mars-crosser	MBA (middle)	Jupiter trojan	Trans-Neptunian obj.
Unclassified

== 701001–701100 ==
Designation			Discovery			Properties		Ref
Permanent	Provisional	Named after	Date	Site	Discoverer(s)	Category	Diam.	Ref
701001	2003 UW_{341}	—	September 19, 2003	Kitt Peak	Spacewatch	H	510 m	MPC · JPL
701002	2003 UY_{347}	—	September 20, 2003	Palomar	NEAT	·	1.4 km	MPC · JPL
701003	2003 UN_{350}	—	October 19, 2003	Apache Point	SDSS Collaboration	·	1.3 km	MPC · JPL
701004	2003 UH_{352}	—	January 8, 2011	Mount Lemmon	Mount Lemmon Survey	·	2.4 km	MPC · JPL
701005	2003 UL_{352}	—	October 19, 2003	Apache Point	SDSS	·	1.9 km	MPC · JPL
701006	2003 UU_{353}	—	October 19, 2003	Apache Point	SDSS Collaboration	·	1.6 km	MPC · JPL
701007	2003 UL_{354}	—	October 19, 2003	Apache Point	SDSS Collaboration	·	940 m	MPC · JPL
701008	2003 UD_{355}	—	October 19, 2003	Apache Point	SDSS Collaboration	·	1.9 km	MPC · JPL
701009	2003 UH_{358}	—	October 19, 2003	Kitt Peak	Spacewatch	·	1.5 km	MPC · JPL
701010	2003 US_{359}	—	October 19, 2003	Kitt Peak	Spacewatch	·	2.1 km	MPC · JPL
701011	2003 UZ_{360}	—	September 27, 2003	Kitt Peak	Spacewatch	·	1.6 km	MPC · JPL
701012	2003 UV_{364}	—	October 20, 2003	Kitt Peak	Spacewatch	·	990 m	MPC · JPL
701013	2003 UU_{365}	—	October 20, 2003	Kitt Peak	Spacewatch	·	940 m	MPC · JPL
701014	2003 UQ_{367}	—	October 21, 2003	Kitt Peak	Spacewatch	·	890 m	MPC · JPL
701015	2003 UL_{377}	—	October 22, 2003	Apache Point	SDSS Collaboration	MAS	580 m	MPC · JPL
701016	2003 UN_{384}	—	October 22, 2003	Apache Point	SDSS	·	1.3 km	MPC · JPL
701017	2003 UB_{389}	—	October 22, 2003	Apache Point	SDSS Collaboration	·	2.2 km	MPC · JPL
701018	2003 UM_{390}	—	October 22, 2003	Apache Point	SDSS Collaboration	·	1.1 km	MPC · JPL
701019	2003 UD_{396}	—	October 22, 2003	Apache Point	SDSS Collaboration	·	1 km	MPC · JPL
701020	2003 UF_{397}	—	November 21, 2003	Palomar	NEAT	·	1.3 km	MPC · JPL
701021	2003 UG_{398}	—	October 22, 2003	Apache Point	SDSS Collaboration	·	2.3 km	MPC · JPL
701022	2003 UF_{401}	—	September 23, 2003	Palomar	NEAT	·	1.4 km	MPC · JPL
701023	2003 UQ_{408}	—	October 23, 2003	Apache Point	SDSS Collaboration	·	1.3 km	MPC · JPL
701024	2003 UM_{409}	—	October 23, 2003	Apache Point	SDSS Collaboration	HNS	920 m	MPC · JPL
701025	2003 UK_{410}	—	October 23, 2003	Apache Point	SDSS Collaboration	·	2.5 km	MPC · JPL
701026	2003 UM_{410}	—	October 23, 2003	Apache Point	SDSS Collaboration	·	1.2 km	MPC · JPL
701027	2003 UJ_{420}	—	December 30, 2007	Kitt Peak	Spacewatch	·	750 m	MPC · JPL
701028	2003 UK_{420}	—	March 17, 2005	Catalina	CSS	EUN	1.1 km	MPC · JPL
701029	2003 UQ_{420}	—	October 23, 2003	Kitt Peak	Spacewatch	EOS	1.6 km	MPC · JPL
701030	2003 UR_{420}	—	January 21, 2012	Kitt Peak	Spacewatch	MAS	590 m	MPC · JPL
701031	2003 UL_{421}	—	March 12, 2014	Mount Lemmon	Mount Lemmon Survey	·	1.4 km	MPC · JPL
701032	2003 UC_{422}	—	October 11, 2010	Mount Lemmon	Mount Lemmon Survey	·	700 m	MPC · JPL
701033	2003 UV_{422}	—	August 29, 2014	Mount Lemmon	Mount Lemmon Survey	EOS	1.7 km	MPC · JPL
701034	2003 UA_{423}	—	November 14, 2010	Kitt Peak	Spacewatch	·	580 m	MPC · JPL
701035	2003 US_{423}	—	January 23, 2006	Kitt Peak	Spacewatch	·	2.2 km	MPC · JPL
701036	2003 UC_{424}	—	November 26, 2009	Mount Lemmon	Mount Lemmon Survey	·	2.1 km	MPC · JPL
701037	2003 UN_{424}	—	September 21, 2008	Mount Lemmon	Mount Lemmon Survey	·	2.7 km	MPC · JPL
701038	2003 UK_{425}	—	October 23, 2003	Kitt Peak	Spacewatch	·	1.4 km	MPC · JPL
701039	2003 UL_{425}	—	July 31, 2014	Haleakala	Pan-STARRS 1	·	1.0 km	MPC · JPL
701040	2003 UO_{425}	—	March 4, 2011	Mount Lemmon	Mount Lemmon Survey	·	1.8 km	MPC · JPL
701041	2003 UP_{426}	—	April 2, 2005	Mount Lemmon	Mount Lemmon Survey	JUN	880 m	MPC · JPL
701042	2003 UO_{427}	—	November 27, 2014	Haleakala	Pan-STARRS 1	·	2.7 km	MPC · JPL
701043	2003 UQ_{427}	—	September 17, 2012	Mount Lemmon	Mount Lemmon Survey	PAD	1.2 km	MPC · JPL
701044	2003 UB_{428}	—	October 9, 2016	Mount Lemmon	Mount Lemmon Survey	·	1.2 km	MPC · JPL
701045	2003 UA_{430}	—	March 2, 2009	Kitt Peak	Spacewatch	·	1.2 km	MPC · JPL
701046	2003 US_{430}	—	September 5, 2011	Haleakala	Pan-STARRS 1	H	350 m	MPC · JPL
701047	2003 UV_{431}	—	September 26, 2011	Kitt Peak	Spacewatch	(5)	1.1 km	MPC · JPL
701048	2003 UO_{432}	—	February 25, 2006	Kitt Peak	Spacewatch	·	2.1 km	MPC · JPL
701049	2003 UG_{433}	—	September 3, 2008	Kitt Peak	Spacewatch	THM	1.8 km	MPC · JPL
701050	2003 UJ_{433}	—	October 22, 2003	Kitt Peak	Spacewatch	·	1.1 km	MPC · JPL
701051	2003 UL_{433}	—	November 9, 2009	Kitt Peak	Spacewatch	EOS	1.6 km	MPC · JPL
701052	2003 UM_{433}	—	September 10, 2007	Mount Lemmon	Mount Lemmon Survey	(5)	1.1 km	MPC · JPL
701053	2003 UW_{433}	—	April 23, 2015	Haleakala	Pan-STARRS 2	·	1.2 km	MPC · JPL
701054	2003 UV_{434}	—	September 17, 2006	Kitt Peak	Spacewatch	·	560 m	MPC · JPL
701055	2003 UE_{436}	—	October 22, 1995	Kitt Peak	Spacewatch	·	730 m	MPC · JPL
701056	2003 UF_{436}	—	March 13, 2011	Mount Lemmon	Mount Lemmon Survey	·	1.9 km	MPC · JPL
701057	2003 UG_{436}	—	September 10, 2007	Mount Lemmon	Mount Lemmon Survey	·	1.6 km	MPC · JPL
701058	2003 UM_{436}	—	June 15, 2009	Kitt Peak	Spacewatch	·	660 m	MPC · JPL
701059	2003 UD_{437}	—	July 19, 2015	Haleakala	Pan-STARRS 1	·	1.2 km	MPC · JPL
701060	2003 UO_{437}	—	November 19, 2008	Kitt Peak	Spacewatch	HOF	1.8 km	MPC · JPL
701061	2003 UR_{437}	—	October 1, 2017	Haleakala	Pan-STARRS 1	·	1.4 km	MPC · JPL
701062	2003 UV_{437}	—	March 13, 2012	Mount Lemmon	Mount Lemmon Survey	·	2.1 km	MPC · JPL
701063	2003 UM_{438}	—	April 21, 2012	Mount Lemmon	Mount Lemmon Survey	EOS	1.6 km	MPC · JPL
701064	2003 UO_{438}	—	August 27, 2014	Haleakala	Pan-STARRS 1	·	2.4 km	MPC · JPL
701065	2003 UU_{438}	—	October 18, 2003	Kitt Peak	Spacewatch	EOS	1.3 km	MPC · JPL
701066	2003 UA_{440}	—	December 31, 2008	Kitt Peak	Spacewatch	·	1.2 km	MPC · JPL
701067	2003 UZ_{440}	—	May 2, 2006	Mount Lemmon	Mount Lemmon Survey	(5)	810 m	MPC · JPL
701068	2003 UR_{441}	—	May 22, 2015	Haleakala	Pan-STARRS 2	·	1.5 km	MPC · JPL
701069	2003 UG_{442}	—	October 20, 2003	Kitt Peak	Spacewatch	·	1.7 km	MPC · JPL
701070	2003 UV_{442}	—	October 1, 2008	Kitt Peak	Spacewatch	KOR	1.0 km	MPC · JPL
701071	2003 UG_{446}	—	October 19, 2003	Kitt Peak	Spacewatch	·	2.8 km	MPC · JPL
701072	2003 UT_{447}	—	October 24, 2003	Anderson Mesa	LONEOS	H	530 m	MPC · JPL
701073	2003 UH_{448}	—	October 20, 2003	Kitt Peak	Spacewatch	·	810 m	MPC · JPL
701074	2003 UD_{450}	—	October 24, 2003	Kitt Peak	Spacewatch	BRG	1.4 km	MPC · JPL
701075	2003 UJ_{450}	—	October 24, 2003	Kitt Peak	Spacewatch	·	1.3 km	MPC · JPL
701076	2003 UK_{450}	—	October 23, 2003	Kitt Peak	Spacewatch	·	730 m	MPC · JPL
701077	2003 VS_{12}	—	December 17, 2007	Mount Lemmon	Mount Lemmon Survey	·	720 m	MPC · JPL
701078	2003 WO_{8}	—	November 16, 2003	Kitt Peak	Spacewatch	·	1.5 km	MPC · JPL
701079	2003 WE_{27}	—	October 27, 2003	Kitt Peak	Spacewatch	·	2.8 km	MPC · JPL
701080	2003 WU_{32}	—	October 19, 2003	Kitt Peak	Spacewatch	·	1.4 km	MPC · JPL
701081	2003 WR_{48}	—	November 19, 2003	Kitt Peak	Spacewatch	·	690 m	MPC · JPL
701082	2003 WS_{57}	—	November 18, 2003	Kitt Peak	Spacewatch	·	670 m	MPC · JPL
701083	2003 WW_{70}	—	November 20, 2003	Palomar	NEAT	JUN	900 m	MPC · JPL
701084	2003 WZ_{92}	—	November 20, 2003	Socorro	LINEAR	·	3.4 km	MPC · JPL
701085	2003 WC_{114}	—	November 14, 2003	Palomar	NEAT	(1547)	1.4 km	MPC · JPL
701086	2003 WF_{115}	—	November 20, 2003	Socorro	LINEAR	TIR	2.7 km	MPC · JPL
701087	2003 WU_{164}	—	November 30, 2003	Kitt Peak	Spacewatch	MAS	510 m	MPC · JPL
701088	2003 WC_{176}	—	November 19, 2003	Kitt Peak	Spacewatch	EOS	1.5 km	MPC · JPL
701089	2003 WY_{176}	—	October 22, 2003	Kitt Peak	Deep Ecliptic Survey	·	860 m	MPC · JPL
701090	2003 WM_{178}	—	November 20, 2003	Kitt Peak	Deep Ecliptic Survey	·	1.1 km	MPC · JPL
701091	2003 WT_{178}	—	November 20, 2003	Kitt Peak	Deep Ecliptic Survey	MAR	770 m	MPC · JPL
701092	2003 WP_{182}	—	November 22, 2003	Kitt Peak	Deep Ecliptic Survey	·	2.0 km	MPC · JPL
701093	2003 WK_{184}	—	November 20, 2003	Kitt Peak	Deep Ecliptic Survey	·	890 m	MPC · JPL
701094	2003 WY_{185}	—	September 28, 2003	Kitt Peak	Spacewatch	(5)	800 m	MPC · JPL
701095	2003 WT_{191}	—	January 17, 2009	Kitt Peak	Spacewatch	·	1.5 km	MPC · JPL
701096	2003 WU_{197}	—	October 15, 2013	Mount Lemmon	Mount Lemmon Survey	·	570 m	MPC · JPL
701097	2003 WY_{197}	—	November 7, 2007	Catalina	CSS	·	1.6 km	MPC · JPL
701098	2003 WE_{198}	—	November 18, 2003	Kitt Peak	Spacewatch	·	960 m	MPC · JPL
701099	2003 WG_{198}	—	November 16, 2003	Kitt Peak	Spacewatch	·	2.1 km	MPC · JPL
701100	2003 WO_{198}	—	January 17, 2009	Kitt Peak	Spacewatch	·	1.3 km	MPC · JPL

== 701101–701200 ==
back to top

Designation			Discovery			Properties		Ref
Permanent	Provisional	Named after	Date	Site	Discoverer(s)	Category	Diam.	Ref
701101	2003 WP_{198}	—	August 17, 2006	Palomar	NEAT	·	730 m	MPC · JPL
701102	2003 WY_{198}	—	October 26, 2014	Mount Lemmon	Mount Lemmon Survey	PHO	960 m	MPC · JPL
701103	2003 WF_{199}	—	November 24, 2003	Kitt Peak	Spacewatch	·	630 m	MPC · JPL
701104	2003 WX_{199}	—	December 10, 2009	Mount Lemmon	Mount Lemmon Survey	·	2.3 km	MPC · JPL
701105	2003 WD_{200}	—	February 26, 2014	Haleakala	Pan-STARRS 1	·	1.5 km	MPC · JPL
701106	2003 WM_{200}	—	November 24, 2003	Kitt Peak	Spacewatch	·	570 m	MPC · JPL
701107	2003 WU_{201}	—	September 25, 2008	Kitt Peak	Spacewatch	·	1.4 km	MPC · JPL
701108	2003 WX_{201}	—	November 3, 2008	Kitt Peak	Spacewatch	·	1.4 km	MPC · JPL
701109	2003 WD_{202}	—	January 13, 2008	Kitt Peak	Spacewatch	·	560 m	MPC · JPL
701110	2003 WL_{202}	—	November 14, 2012	Kitt Peak	Spacewatch	·	1.4 km	MPC · JPL
701111	2003 WD_{204}	—	October 24, 2014	Kitt Peak	Spacewatch	·	2.5 km	MPC · JPL
701112	2003 WM_{205}	—	November 29, 2003	Kitt Peak	Spacewatch	EOS	2.0 km	MPC · JPL
701113	2003 WP_{205}	—	November 17, 2014	Haleakala	Pan-STARRS 1	EOS	1.5 km	MPC · JPL
701114	2003 WQ_{205}	—	September 24, 2008	Mount Lemmon	Mount Lemmon Survey	·	2.3 km	MPC · JPL
701115	2003 WV_{205}	—	November 20, 2003	Kitt Peak	Spacewatch	·	2.3 km	MPC · JPL
701116	2003 WB_{206}	—	August 7, 2018	Haleakala	Pan-STARRS 1	·	2.2 km	MPC · JPL
701117	2003 WF_{206}	—	November 26, 2014	Haleakala	Pan-STARRS 1	·	2.6 km	MPC · JPL
701118	2003 WK_{206}	—	April 16, 2013	Haleakala	Pan-STARRS 1	H	450 m	MPC · JPL
701119	2003 WX_{206}	—	February 20, 2014	Mount Lemmon	Mount Lemmon Survey	·	1.2 km	MPC · JPL
701120	2003 WL_{208}	—	January 1, 2008	Kitt Peak	Spacewatch	·	830 m	MPC · JPL
701121	2003 WP_{208}	—	October 15, 2007	Mount Lemmon	Mount Lemmon Survey	EUN	1.0 km	MPC · JPL
701122	2003 WY_{210}	—	January 14, 2015	Haleakala	Pan-STARRS 1	EOS	1.6 km	MPC · JPL
701123	2003 WE_{212}	—	October 16, 2014	Mount Lemmon	Mount Lemmon Survey	·	2.5 km	MPC · JPL
701124	2003 WG_{212}	—	July 4, 2018	Haleakala	Pan-STARRS 2	·	1.9 km	MPC · JPL
701125	2003 WO_{212}	—	November 26, 2017	Mount Lemmon	Mount Lemmon Survey	·	490 m	MPC · JPL
701126	2003 WG_{213}	—	July 15, 2013	Haleakala	Pan-STARRS 1	·	1.1 km	MPC · JPL
701127	2003 WO_{214}	—	November 20, 2003	Kitt Peak	Spacewatch	·	1.1 km	MPC · JPL
701128	2003 WB_{215}	—	November 23, 2003	Kitt Peak	Spacewatch	·	1.1 km	MPC · JPL
701129	2003 WC_{216}	—	November 30, 2003	Kitt Peak	Spacewatch	·	1.1 km	MPC · JPL
701130	2003 WD_{217}	—	November 21, 2003	Kitt Peak	Spacewatch	·	1.6 km	MPC · JPL
701131	2003 XF_{23}	—	December 1, 2003	Kitt Peak	Spacewatch	·	3.0 km	MPC · JPL
701132	2003 XG_{28}	—	December 1, 2003	Kitt Peak	Spacewatch	EOS	1.5 km	MPC · JPL
701133	2003 XC_{30}	—	November 19, 2003	Kitt Peak	Spacewatch	EOS	1.4 km	MPC · JPL
701134	2003 XQ_{44}	—	September 16, 2010	Mount Lemmon	Mount Lemmon Survey	·	820 m	MPC · JPL
701135	2003 XG_{45}	—	October 27, 2008	Mount Lemmon	Mount Lemmon Survey	·	1.3 km	MPC · JPL
701136	2003 XO_{45}	—	October 10, 2008	Mount Lemmon	Mount Lemmon Survey	·	2.2 km	MPC · JPL
701137	2003 XQ_{45}	—	September 6, 2008	Kitt Peak	Spacewatch	·	2.2 km	MPC · JPL
701138	2003 XW_{45}	—	September 24, 2008	Kitt Peak	Spacewatch	·	1.9 km	MPC · JPL
701139	2003 XJ_{46}	—	October 28, 2008	Mount Lemmon	Mount Lemmon Survey	EOS	1.5 km	MPC · JPL
701140	2003 YY_{8}	—	December 20, 2003	Socorro	LINEAR	H	520 m	MPC · JPL
701141	2003 YH_{67}	—	November 24, 2003	Anderson Mesa	LONEOS	EOS	1.7 km	MPC · JPL
701142	2003 YR_{166}	—	December 17, 2003	Kitt Peak	Spacewatch	·	650 m	MPC · JPL
701143	2003 YT_{183}	—	August 29, 2006	Kitt Peak	Spacewatch	·	610 m	MPC · JPL
701144	2003 YK_{184}	—	February 28, 2016	Haleakala	Pan-STARRS 1	·	3.0 km	MPC · JPL
701145	2003 YB_{185}	—	September 28, 2008	Mount Lemmon	Mount Lemmon Survey	·	2.6 km	MPC · JPL
701146	2003 YH_{185}	—	October 9, 2007	Mount Lemmon	Mount Lemmon Survey	·	1.1 km	MPC · JPL
701147	2003 YS_{185}	—	June 4, 2013	Nogales	M. Schwartz, P. R. Holvorcem	H	560 m	MPC · JPL
701148	2003 YT_{185}	—	December 28, 2003	Kitt Peak	Spacewatch	·	1.6 km	MPC · JPL
701149	2003 YA_{187}	—	October 12, 2016	Haleakala	Pan-STARRS 1	·	1.5 km	MPC · JPL
701150	2003 YO_{187}	—	December 29, 2014	Mount Lemmon	Mount Lemmon Survey	·	2.4 km	MPC · JPL
701151	2003 YT_{187}	—	January 23, 2015	Haleakala	Pan-STARRS 1	·	2.0 km	MPC · JPL
701152	2003 YU_{187}	—	October 28, 2008	Kitt Peak	Spacewatch	·	2.5 km	MPC · JPL
701153	2003 YX_{187}	—	March 12, 2016	Haleakala	Pan-STARRS 1	·	1.0 km	MPC · JPL
701154	2003 YF_{189}	—	August 27, 2006	Kitt Peak	Spacewatch	·	950 m	MPC · JPL
701155	2004 AK_{23}	—	December 21, 2003	Kitt Peak	Spacewatch	(22805)	2.7 km	MPC · JPL
701156	2004 AK_{27}	—	December 26, 2014	Haleakala	Pan-STARRS 1	·	2.4 km	MPC · JPL
701157	2004 AL_{27}	—	August 20, 2014	Haleakala	Pan-STARRS 1	·	950 m	MPC · JPL
701158	2004 BX_{11}	—	January 16, 2004	Palomar	NEAT	·	3.9 km	MPC · JPL
701159	2004 BP_{18}	—	January 18, 2004	Kitt Peak	Spacewatch	EOS	1.8 km	MPC · JPL
701160	2004 BV_{66}	—	January 22, 2004	Socorro	LINEAR	·	960 m	MPC · JPL
701161	2004 BJ_{91}	—	January 24, 2004	Socorro	LINEAR	·	2.6 km	MPC · JPL
701162	2004 BT_{112}	—	January 27, 2004	Kitt Peak	Spacewatch	·	580 m	MPC · JPL
701163	2004 BQ_{126}	—	January 16, 2004	Kitt Peak	Spacewatch	·	2.9 km	MPC · JPL
701164	2004 BL_{128}	—	January 16, 2004	Kitt Peak	Spacewatch	·	650 m	MPC · JPL
701165	2004 BV_{132}	—	January 17, 2004	Kitt Peak	Spacewatch	·	670 m	MPC · JPL
701166	2004 BC_{134}	—	January 18, 2004	Kitt Peak	Spacewatch	·	2.8 km	MPC · JPL
701167	2004 BE_{134}	—	January 18, 2004	Kitt Peak	Spacewatch	·	1.6 km	MPC · JPL
701168	2004 BN_{137}	—	January 19, 2004	Kitt Peak	Spacewatch	·	1.7 km	MPC · JPL
701169	2004 BQ_{155}	—	January 28, 2004	Kitt Peak	Spacewatch	·	3.1 km	MPC · JPL
701170	2004 BD_{156}	—	January 28, 2004	Kitt Peak	Spacewatch	AGN	1.1 km	MPC · JPL
701171	2004 BE_{156}	—	January 28, 2004	Kitt Peak	Spacewatch	·	2.4 km	MPC · JPL
701172	2004 BY_{164}	—	April 5, 2014	Haleakala	Pan-STARRS 1	·	590 m	MPC · JPL
701173	2004 BC_{165}	—	September 17, 2006	Kitt Peak	Spacewatch	·	810 m	MPC · JPL
701174	2004 BG_{165}	—	January 10, 2013	Haleakala	Pan-STARRS 1	·	1.6 km	MPC · JPL
701175	2004 BM_{165}	—	January 16, 2011	Mount Lemmon	Mount Lemmon Survey	·	610 m	MPC · JPL
701176	2004 BN_{165}	—	May 29, 2012	Mount Lemmon	Mount Lemmon Survey	URS	3.1 km	MPC · JPL
701177	2004 BO_{165}	—	April 6, 2011	Kitt Peak	Spacewatch	·	3.1 km	MPC · JPL
701178	2004 BZ_{165}	—	March 27, 2008	Mount Lemmon	Mount Lemmon Survey	·	920 m	MPC · JPL
701179	2004 BM_{166}	—	May 10, 2015	Mount Lemmon	Mount Lemmon Survey	V	560 m	MPC · JPL
701180	2004 BP_{166}	—	September 10, 2007	Kitt Peak	Spacewatch	·	1.4 km	MPC · JPL
701181	2004 BQ_{166}	—	January 31, 2004	Apache Point	SDSS Collaboration	·	2.3 km	MPC · JPL
701182	2004 BS_{166}	—	September 9, 2007	Kitt Peak	Spacewatch	DOR	2.0 km	MPC · JPL
701183	2004 BG_{168}	—	January 24, 2015	Haleakala	Pan-STARRS 1	H	510 m	MPC · JPL
701184	2004 BV_{169}	—	November 14, 2010	Kitt Peak	Spacewatch	·	1.2 km	MPC · JPL
701185	2004 BY_{169}	—	April 26, 2017	Haleakala	Pan-STARRS 1	·	2.9 km	MPC · JPL
701186	2004 BF_{170}	—	October 24, 2011	Haleakala	Pan-STARRS 1	EUN	1.2 km	MPC · JPL
701187	2004 BH_{170}	—	October 15, 2013	Kitt Peak	Spacewatch	·	2.2 km	MPC · JPL
701188	2004 BP_{170}	—	September 15, 2013	Mount Lemmon	Mount Lemmon Survey	·	2.9 km	MPC · JPL
701189	2004 BM_{171}	—	June 13, 2015	Haleakala	Pan-STARRS 1	·	1.5 km	MPC · JPL
701190	2004 BP_{172}	—	January 19, 2015	Kitt Peak	Spacewatch	·	2.1 km	MPC · JPL
701191	2004 BY_{172}	—	March 17, 2009	Kitt Peak	Spacewatch	·	1.3 km	MPC · JPL
701192	2004 CW_{8}	—	February 11, 2004	Kitt Peak	Spacewatch	MAS	570 m	MPC · JPL
701193	2004 CZ_{9}	—	January 30, 2004	Kitt Peak	Spacewatch	(11882)	1.3 km	MPC · JPL
701194	2004 CO_{11}	—	February 11, 2004	Palomar	NEAT	·	790 m	MPC · JPL
701195	2004 CS_{25}	—	February 11, 2004	Kitt Peak	Spacewatch	DOR	1.8 km	MPC · JPL
701196	2004 CY_{30}	—	January 19, 2004	Kitt Peak	Spacewatch	·	950 m	MPC · JPL
701197	2004 CT_{31}	—	January 30, 2004	Kitt Peak	Spacewatch	MAS	600 m	MPC · JPL
701198	2004 CM_{53}	—	February 11, 2004	Palomar	NEAT	·	840 m	MPC · JPL
701199	2004 CE_{60}	—	January 31, 2004	Campo Imperatore	CINEOS	·	2.4 km	MPC · JPL
701200	2004 CY_{116}	—	February 11, 2004	Kitt Peak	Spacewatch	THM	1.9 km	MPC · JPL

== 701201–701300 ==
back to top

Designation			Discovery			Properties		Ref
Permanent	Provisional	Named after	Date	Site	Discoverer(s)	Category	Diam.	Ref
701201	2004 CN_{119}	—	February 12, 2004	Kitt Peak	Spacewatch	·	2.1 km	MPC · JPL
701202	2004 CR_{131}	—	January 23, 2015	Haleakala	Pan-STARRS 1	·	950 m	MPC · JPL
701203	2004 CU_{131}	—	September 14, 2013	Haleakala	Pan-STARRS 1	V	500 m	MPC · JPL
701204	2004 CB_{132}	—	March 13, 2012	Kitt Peak	Spacewatch	·	990 m	MPC · JPL
701205	2004 CS_{132}	—	January 16, 2015	Haleakala	Pan-STARRS 1	EOS	1.6 km	MPC · JPL
701206	2004 CX_{132}	—	December 21, 2014	Haleakala	Pan-STARRS 1	·	2.4 km	MPC · JPL
701207	2004 CG_{133}	—	November 5, 2016	Haleakala	Pan-STARRS 1	·	1.6 km	MPC · JPL
701208	2004 CM_{134}	—	February 20, 2009	Kitt Peak	Spacewatch	GEF	950 m	MPC · JPL
701209	2004 CN_{134}	—	April 27, 2012	Haleakala	Pan-STARRS 1	·	840 m	MPC · JPL
701210	2004 CU_{134}	—	January 27, 2017	Haleakala	Pan-STARRS 1	·	1.5 km	MPC · JPL
701211	2004 CJ_{136}	—	January 22, 2015	Haleakala	Pan-STARRS 1	·	1.7 km	MPC · JPL
701212	2004 DS_{23}	—	February 19, 2004	Socorro	LINEAR	·	1.3 km	MPC · JPL
701213	2004 DT_{28}	—	February 17, 2004	Kitt Peak	Spacewatch	·	2.6 km	MPC · JPL
701214	2004 DB_{58}	—	February 23, 2004	Socorro	LINEAR	3:2	4.9 km	MPC · JPL
701215	2004 DT_{58}	—	February 14, 2004	Kitt Peak	Spacewatch	·	1.3 km	MPC · JPL
701216	2004 DK_{68}	—	February 26, 2004	Kitt Peak	Deep Ecliptic Survey	HOF	2.1 km	MPC · JPL
701217	2004 DU_{70}	—	February 26, 2004	Kitt Peak	Deep Ecliptic Survey	·	430 m	MPC · JPL
701218	2004 DE_{80}	—	February 11, 2004	Kitt Peak	Spacewatch	·	690 m	MPC · JPL
701219	2004 DN_{80}	—	February 16, 2004	Kitt Peak	Spacewatch	·	1.2 km	MPC · JPL
701220	2004 DO_{80}	—	September 15, 2006	Kitt Peak	Spacewatch	·	720 m	MPC · JPL
701221	2004 DZ_{80}	—	November 8, 2013	Catalina	CSS	·	2.7 km	MPC · JPL
701222	2004 DA_{81}	—	February 16, 2010	Kitt Peak	Spacewatch	·	2.9 km	MPC · JPL
701223	2004 DB_{81}	—	August 18, 2006	Kitt Peak	Spacewatch	·	2.1 km	MPC · JPL
701224	2004 DX_{81}	—	December 11, 2013	Haleakala	Pan-STARRS 1	·	660 m	MPC · JPL
701225	2004 DG_{82}	—	September 25, 2012	Kitt Peak	Spacewatch	EOS	1.7 km	MPC · JPL
701226	2004 DP_{82}	—	December 5, 1996	Kitt Peak	Spacewatch	·	630 m	MPC · JPL
701227	2004 DS_{82}	—	August 2, 2011	Haleakala	Pan-STARRS 1	·	1.6 km	MPC · JPL
701228	2004 DO_{83}	—	December 26, 2014	Haleakala	Pan-STARRS 1	·	3.1 km	MPC · JPL
701229	2004 DW_{84}	—	September 9, 2015	Haleakala	Pan-STARRS 1	·	1.3 km	MPC · JPL
701230	2004 DD_{85}	—	September 6, 2013	Kitt Peak	Spacewatch	·	2.7 km	MPC · JPL
701231	2004 DN_{85}	—	February 11, 2016	Haleakala	Pan-STARRS 1	·	3.1 km	MPC · JPL
701232	2004 DV_{85}	—	August 24, 2017	Haleakala	Pan-STARRS 1	·	1.1 km	MPC · JPL
701233	2004 DE_{86}	—	November 20, 2006	Kitt Peak	Spacewatch	·	680 m	MPC · JPL
701234	2004 DJ_{86}	—	September 15, 2017	Mauna Kea	Crowder, C.	V	400 m	MPC · JPL
701235	2004 DD_{87}	—	April 20, 2009	Catalina	CSS	·	2.0 km	MPC · JPL
701236	2004 DD_{88}	—	July 8, 2018	Haleakala	Pan-STARRS 1	·	2.6 km	MPC · JPL
701237	2004 DR_{89}	—	February 17, 2004	La Silla	Barbieri, C.	·	1.7 km	MPC · JPL
701238	2004 DW_{89}	—	February 27, 2004	Kitt Peak	Deep Ecliptic Survey	HOF	2.2 km	MPC · JPL
701239	2004 EY	—	March 10, 2004	Palomar	NEAT	H	600 m	MPC · JPL
701240	2004 EY_{15}	—	February 26, 2004	Socorro	LINEAR	·	2.4 km	MPC · JPL
701241	2004 EF_{34}	—	March 12, 2004	Palomar	NEAT	·	910 m	MPC · JPL
701242	2004 ET_{44}	—	March 15, 2004	Kitt Peak	Spacewatch	·	910 m	MPC · JPL
701243	2004 ES_{96}	—	March 11, 2004	Palomar	NEAT	·	1.7 km	MPC · JPL
701244	2004 EM_{102}	—	March 15, 2004	Kitt Peak	Spacewatch	EOS	1.9 km	MPC · JPL
701245	2004 EJ_{109}	—	August 28, 2001	Kitt Peak	Spacewatch	·	950 m	MPC · JPL
701246	2004 EJ_{111}	—	March 15, 2004	Kitt Peak	Spacewatch	·	2.7 km	MPC · JPL
701247	2004 EO_{116}	—	December 31, 2008	Kitt Peak	Spacewatch	HYG	2.3 km	MPC · JPL
701248	2004 ES_{116}	—	May 15, 2008	Kitt Peak	Spacewatch	MAS	580 m	MPC · JPL
701249	2004 EW_{116}	—	April 18, 2009	Mount Lemmon	Mount Lemmon Survey	·	1.8 km	MPC · JPL
701250	2004 EA_{117}	—	January 13, 2008	Kitt Peak	Spacewatch	WIT	820 m	MPC · JPL
701251	2004 EH_{117}	—	April 18, 2013	Mount Lemmon	Mount Lemmon Survey	·	1.5 km	MPC · JPL
701252	2004 EW_{117}	—	March 28, 2017	Haleakala	Pan-STARRS 1	·	970 m	MPC · JPL
701253	2004 FU_{70}	—	March 17, 2004	Kitt Peak	Spacewatch	·	2.2 km	MPC · JPL
701254	2004 FH_{78}	—	March 19, 2004	Kitt Peak	Spacewatch	HOF	2.4 km	MPC · JPL
701255	2004 FO_{104}	—	March 23, 2004	Socorro	LINEAR	(1547)	1.3 km	MPC · JPL
701256	2004 FQ_{109}	—	March 24, 2004	Anderson Mesa	LONEOS	·	2.3 km	MPC · JPL
701257	2004 FV_{128}	—	March 28, 2004	Kitt Peak	Spacewatch	·	700 m	MPC · JPL
701258	2004 FW_{135}	—	March 27, 2004	Kitt Peak	Spacewatch	(1298)	2.5 km	MPC · JPL
701259	2004 FC_{145}	—	March 29, 2004	Kitt Peak	Spacewatch	EUN	780 m	MPC · JPL
701260	2004 FY_{149}	—	March 16, 2004	Kitt Peak	Spacewatch	VER	2.7 km	MPC · JPL
701261	2004 FC_{156}	—	March 17, 2004	Kitt Peak	Spacewatch	V	510 m	MPC · JPL
701262	2004 FQ_{160}	—	March 18, 2004	Socorro	LINEAR	JUN	800 m	MPC · JPL
701263	2004 FE_{167}	—	October 14, 2013	Mount Lemmon	Mount Lemmon Survey	V	610 m	MPC · JPL
701264	2004 FQ_{167}	—	September 14, 2013	Mount Lemmon	Mount Lemmon Survey	·	1.0 km	MPC · JPL
701265	2004 FD_{169}	—	September 25, 2006	Kitt Peak	Spacewatch	·	1.7 km	MPC · JPL
701266	2004 FX_{169}	—	October 30, 2013	Haleakala	Pan-STARRS 1	(2076)	850 m	MPC · JPL
701267	2004 FG_{170}	—	April 4, 2014	Kitt Peak	Spacewatch	·	450 m	MPC · JPL
701268	2004 FV_{172}	—	October 13, 2007	Mount Lemmon	Mount Lemmon Survey	EOS	1.7 km	MPC · JPL
701269	2004 FC_{173}	—	July 4, 2014	Haleakala	Pan-STARRS 1	·	1.5 km	MPC · JPL
701270	2004 FK_{174}	—	October 9, 2012	Mount Lemmon	Mount Lemmon Survey	·	2.0 km	MPC · JPL
701271	2004 FY_{175}	—	April 2, 2011	Kitt Peak	Spacewatch	·	570 m	MPC · JPL
701272	2004 FD_{176}	—	March 9, 2011	Mount Lemmon	Mount Lemmon Survey	·	870 m	MPC · JPL
701273	2004 FV_{176}	—	March 9, 2011	Mount Lemmon	Mount Lemmon Survey	·	870 m	MPC · JPL
701274	2004 FJ_{177}	—	July 27, 2017	Haleakala	Pan-STARRS 1	·	2.1 km	MPC · JPL
701275	2004 FO_{178}	—	March 31, 2004	Kitt Peak	Spacewatch	·	2.6 km	MPC · JPL
701276	2004 GY_{50}	—	April 13, 2004	Kitt Peak	Spacewatch	·	2.1 km	MPC · JPL
701277	2004 GL_{53}	—	April 13, 2004	Kitt Peak	Spacewatch	·	820 m	MPC · JPL
701278	2004 GS_{54}	—	April 13, 2004	Kitt Peak	Spacewatch	·	2.3 km	MPC · JPL
701279	2004 GX_{61}	—	April 13, 2004	Kitt Peak	Spacewatch	·	1.4 km	MPC · JPL
701280	2004 GV_{63}	—	April 13, 2004	Kitt Peak	Spacewatch	·	810 m	MPC · JPL
701281	2004 GQ_{73}	—	April 12, 2004	Kitt Peak	Spacewatch	·	1.8 km	MPC · JPL
701282	2004 GG_{80}	—	April 12, 2004	Kitt Peak	Spacewatch	·	970 m	MPC · JPL
701283	2004 GA_{81}	—	March 15, 2004	Kitt Peak	Spacewatch	·	2.6 km	MPC · JPL
701284	2004 GH_{89}	—	November 1, 2005	Kitt Peak	Spacewatch	NYS	1.0 km	MPC · JPL
701285	2004 GL_{89}	—	April 14, 2004	Kitt Peak	Spacewatch	·	620 m	MPC · JPL
701286	2004 GR_{89}	—	June 17, 2012	Kitt Peak	Spacewatch	PHO	960 m	MPC · JPL
701287	2004 GW_{89}	—	February 7, 2008	Mount Lemmon	Mount Lemmon Survey	·	1.4 km	MPC · JPL
701288	2004 GR_{91}	—	November 3, 2011	Kitt Peak	Spacewatch	KOR	1.0 km	MPC · JPL
701289	2004 GT_{91}	—	March 28, 2008	Kitt Peak	Spacewatch	·	1.1 km	MPC · JPL
701290	2004 GZ_{91}	—	September 6, 2008	Kitt Peak	Spacewatch	·	450 m	MPC · JPL
701291	2004 HK_{57}	—	April 21, 2004	Kitt Peak	Spacewatch	MAS	570 m	MPC · JPL
701292	2004 HT_{69}	—	April 22, 2004	Kitt Peak	Spacewatch	·	3.2 km	MPC · JPL
701293	2004 HH_{70}	—	March 28, 2011	Mount Lemmon	Mount Lemmon Survey	NYS	800 m	MPC · JPL
701294	2004 HD_{80}	—	November 7, 2008	Mount Lemmon	Mount Lemmon Survey	·	950 m	MPC · JPL
701295	2004 HP_{80}	—	March 19, 2013	Haleakala	Pan-STARRS 1	·	1.4 km	MPC · JPL
701296	2004 HW_{81}	—	October 15, 2012	Haleakala	Pan-STARRS 1	·	2.7 km	MPC · JPL
701297	2004 HK_{83}	—	April 16, 2004	Siding Spring	SSS	·	780 m	MPC · JPL
701298	2004 HL_{83}	—	April 22, 2004	Kitt Peak	Spacewatch	·	1.6 km	MPC · JPL
701299	2004 HS_{83}	—	February 10, 2008	Mount Lemmon	Mount Lemmon Survey	·	1.2 km	MPC · JPL
701300	2004 HJ_{84}	—	October 24, 2009	Kitt Peak	Spacewatch	·	980 m	MPC · JPL

== 701301–701400 ==
back to top

Designation			Discovery			Properties		Ref
Permanent	Provisional	Named after	Date	Site	Discoverer(s)	Category	Diam.	Ref
701301	2004 HH_{85}	—	April 25, 2004	Kitt Peak	Spacewatch	PHO	790 m	MPC · JPL
701302	2004 JJ_{39}	—	May 14, 2004	Kitt Peak	Spacewatch	·	1.4 km	MPC · JPL
701303	2004 JO_{48}	—	May 13, 2004	Kitt Peak	Spacewatch	MRX	890 m	MPC · JPL
701304	2004 JQ_{48}	—	May 13, 2004	Kitt Peak	Spacewatch	·	1.5 km	MPC · JPL
701305	2004 KE_{21}	—	June 24, 2014	Haleakala	Pan-STARRS 1	·	1.6 km	MPC · JPL
701306	2004 KF_{22}	—	October 3, 2006	Mount Lemmon	Mount Lemmon Survey	·	2.5 km	MPC · JPL
701307	2004 LZ_{31}	—	March 6, 2011	Mount Lemmon	Mount Lemmon Survey	NYS	990 m	MPC · JPL
701308	2004 LJ_{32}	—	May 12, 2013	Haleakala	Pan-STARRS 1	·	2.3 km	MPC · JPL
701309	2004 MW_{5}	—	June 21, 2004	Socorro	LINEAR	·	1.9 km	MPC · JPL
701310	2004 MC_{9}	—	October 14, 2010	Mount Lemmon	Mount Lemmon Survey	H	450 m	MPC · JPL
701311	2004 NX_{20}	—	June 25, 2004	Kitt Peak	Spacewatch	·	1.2 km	MPC · JPL
701312	2004 NA_{32}	—	July 15, 2004	Siding Spring	SSS	·	1.4 km	MPC · JPL
701313	2004 NP_{34}	—	July 15, 2004	Siding Spring	SSS	·	1.5 km	MPC · JPL
701314	2004 OW_{13}	—	July 22, 2004	Mauna Kea	Veillet, C.	·	1.9 km	MPC · JPL
701315	2004 OB_{16}	—	January 9, 2013	Kitt Peak	Spacewatch	·	760 m	MPC · JPL
701316	2004 OF_{16}	—	July 9, 2015	Haleakala	Pan-STARRS 1	TIR	2.2 km	MPC · JPL
701317	2004 PK_{3}	—	July 16, 2004	Socorro	LINEAR	·	660 m	MPC · JPL
701318	2004 PV_{30}	—	August 8, 2004	Socorro	LINEAR	·	820 m	MPC · JPL
701319	2004 PV_{51}	—	August 8, 2004	Socorro	LINEAR	·	1.1 km	MPC · JPL
701320	2004 PE_{53}	—	August 8, 2004	Socorro	LINEAR	·	2.1 km	MPC · JPL
701321	2004 PC_{82}	—	August 10, 2004	Socorro	LINEAR	·	810 m	MPC · JPL
701322	2004 PC_{91}	—	August 11, 2004	Socorro	LINEAR	·	730 m	MPC · JPL
701323	2004 PJ_{108}	—	August 8, 2004	Palomar	NEAT	·	600 m	MPC · JPL
701324	2004 PB_{119}	—	August 10, 2016	Haleakala	Pan-STARRS 1	·	2.1 km	MPC · JPL
701325	2004 PV_{119}	—	November 26, 2014	Kitt Peak	Spacewatch	·	810 m	MPC · JPL
701326	2004 PA_{120}	—	March 4, 2017	Haleakala	Pan-STARRS 1	·	2.4 km	MPC · JPL
701327	2004 PE_{120}	—	December 1, 2005	Mount Lemmon	Mount Lemmon Survey	KOR	1.3 km	MPC · JPL
701328	2004 QM_{7}	—	August 21, 2004	Siding Spring	SSS	EUN	1.0 km	MPC · JPL
701329	2004 QY_{22}	—	August 22, 2004	Mauna Kea	Veillet, C.	·	1.4 km	MPC · JPL
701330	2004 QA_{23}	—	August 22, 2004	Mauna Kea	Veillet, C.	·	820 m	MPC · JPL
701331	2004 QS_{30}	—	May 25, 2007	Mount Lemmon	Mount Lemmon Survey	·	720 m	MPC · JPL
701332	2004 QA_{31}	—	June 3, 2011	Mount Lemmon	Mount Lemmon Survey	·	680 m	MPC · JPL
701333	2004 QF_{31}	—	August 13, 2012	Haleakala	Pan-STARRS 1	·	780 m	MPC · JPL
701334	2004 QH_{35}	—	March 1, 2011	Mount Lemmon	Mount Lemmon Survey	MAS	770 m	MPC · JPL
701335	2004 QJ_{35}	—	July 9, 2015	Haleakala	Pan-STARRS 1	PHO	780 m	MPC · JPL
701336	2004 RF_{8}	—	September 6, 2004	Altschwendt	W. Ries	·	580 m	MPC · JPL
701337	2004 RD_{87}	—	September 7, 2004	Palomar	NEAT	·	570 m	MPC · JPL
701338	2004 RC_{98}	—	September 8, 2004	Socorro	LINEAR	·	600 m	MPC · JPL
701339	2004 RT_{119}	—	September 7, 2004	Kitt Peak	Spacewatch	·	1.7 km	MPC · JPL
701340	2004 RY_{121}	—	September 7, 2004	Kitt Peak	Spacewatch	·	730 m	MPC · JPL
701341	2004 RT_{125}	—	September 7, 2004	Kitt Peak	Spacewatch	·	1.7 km	MPC · JPL
701342	2004 RR_{126}	—	September 7, 2004	Kitt Peak	Spacewatch	·	710 m	MPC · JPL
701343	2004 RV_{126}	—	September 7, 2004	Kitt Peak	Spacewatch	·	1.0 km	MPC · JPL
701344	2004 RO_{128}	—	September 7, 2004	Kitt Peak	Spacewatch	·	520 m	MPC · JPL
701345	2004 RZ_{128}	—	September 7, 2004	Kitt Peak	Spacewatch	·	1.4 km	MPC · JPL
701346	2004 RH_{130}	—	September 7, 2004	Kitt Peak	Spacewatch	·	1.5 km	MPC · JPL
701347	2004 RQ_{145}	—	September 9, 2004	Socorro	LINEAR	·	2.2 km	MPC · JPL
701348	2004 RC_{167}	—	September 7, 2004	Socorro	LINEAR	·	630 m	MPC · JPL
701349	2004 RK_{233}	—	September 9, 2004	Kitt Peak	Spacewatch	·	780 m	MPC · JPL
701350	2004 RR_{246}	—	September 11, 2004	Socorro	LINEAR	MAR	1.0 km	MPC · JPL
701351	2004 RZ_{258}	—	September 10, 2004	Kitt Peak	Spacewatch	AGN	1.0 km	MPC · JPL
701352	2004 RD_{259}	—	September 10, 2004	Kitt Peak	Spacewatch	·	2.8 km	MPC · JPL
701353	2004 RU_{260}	—	September 10, 2004	Kitt Peak	Spacewatch	·	2.0 km	MPC · JPL
701354	2004 RJ_{273}	—	September 11, 2004	Kitt Peak	Spacewatch	·	930 m	MPC · JPL
701355	2004 RY_{274}	—	September 11, 2004	Kitt Peak	Spacewatch	AST	1.3 km	MPC · JPL
701356	2004 RL_{277}	—	September 13, 2004	Kitt Peak	Spacewatch	·	850 m	MPC · JPL
701357	2004 RB_{294}	—	September 11, 2004	Kitt Peak	Spacewatch	·	1.5 km	MPC · JPL
701358	2004 RS_{294}	—	September 11, 2004	Kitt Peak	Spacewatch	·	1.4 km	MPC · JPL
701359	2004 RE_{297}	—	September 11, 2004	Kitt Peak	Spacewatch	MAS	520 m	MPC · JPL
701360	2004 RG_{297}	—	September 11, 2004	Kitt Peak	Spacewatch	·	1.5 km	MPC · JPL
701361	2004 RO_{304}	—	August 22, 2004	Kitt Peak	Spacewatch	·	560 m	MPC · JPL
701362	2004 RV_{326}	—	September 13, 2004	Kitt Peak	Spacewatch	(194)	750 m	MPC · JPL
701363	2004 RG_{344}	—	September 11, 2004	Kitt Peak	Spacewatch	·	860 m	MPC · JPL
701364	2004 RF_{345}	—	October 30, 2005	Mount Lemmon	Mount Lemmon Survey	·	2.4 km	MPC · JPL
701365	2004 RO_{347}	—	January 23, 2006	Kitt Peak	Spacewatch	·	800 m	MPC · JPL
701366	2004 RT_{348}	—	September 12, 2004	Mauna Kea	Wiegert, P.	·	1.0 km	MPC · JPL
701367	2004 RD_{351}	—	October 12, 2004	Kitt Peak	Wasserman, L. H., J. R. Lovering	·	860 m	MPC · JPL
701368	2004 RJ_{358}	—	August 3, 2014	Haleakala	Pan-STARRS 1	·	590 m	MPC · JPL
701369	2004 RG_{360}	—	March 17, 2012	Mount Lemmon	Mount Lemmon Survey	EOS	1.4 km	MPC · JPL
701370	2004 RV_{361}	—	August 28, 2014	Haleakala	Pan-STARRS 1	·	1.7 km	MPC · JPL
701371	2004 RA_{362}	—	September 22, 2004	Goodricke-Pigott	R. A. Tucker	·	780 m	MPC · JPL
701372	2004 RM_{363}	—	September 12, 2004	Kitt Peak	Spacewatch	PHO	970 m	MPC · JPL
701373	2004 RH_{364}	—	September 22, 2011	Mount Lemmon	Mount Lemmon Survey	·	590 m	MPC · JPL
701374	2004 RZ_{365}	—	September 24, 2004	Kitt Peak	Spacewatch	·	2.0 km	MPC · JPL
701375	2004 RC_{366}	—	June 18, 2018	Haleakala	Pan-STARRS 1	KOR	880 m	MPC · JPL
701376	2004 SF_{2}	—	September 16, 2004	Kitt Peak	Spacewatch	·	520 m	MPC · JPL
701377	2004 SN_{15}	—	September 17, 2004	Anderson Mesa	LONEOS	·	2.4 km	MPC · JPL
701378	2004 SY_{62}	—	July 12, 2013	Haleakala	Pan-STARRS 1	·	1.9 km	MPC · JPL
701379	2004 SF_{63}	—	September 3, 2008	Kitt Peak	Spacewatch	·	860 m	MPC · JPL
701380	2004 SL_{65}	—	November 7, 2008	Mount Lemmon	Mount Lemmon Survey	·	740 m	MPC · JPL
701381	2004 SQ_{65}	—	July 27, 2014	Haleakala	Pan-STARRS 1	·	1.5 km	MPC · JPL
701382	2004 TS_{5}	—	October 5, 2004	Kitt Peak	Spacewatch	·	1.8 km	MPC · JPL
701383	2004 TH_{63}	—	April 13, 2002	Kitt Peak	Spacewatch	EOS	1.5 km	MPC · JPL
701384	2004 TE_{84}	—	October 5, 2004	Kitt Peak	Spacewatch	·	1.0 km	MPC · JPL
701385	2004 TK_{84}	—	October 5, 2004	Kitt Peak	Spacewatch	·	1.0 km	MPC · JPL
701386	2004 TM_{89}	—	October 5, 2004	Kitt Peak	Spacewatch	·	1.2 km	MPC · JPL
701387	2004 TC_{99}	—	October 5, 2004	Kitt Peak	Spacewatch	KOR	990 m	MPC · JPL
701388	2004 TW_{140}	—	October 4, 2004	Kitt Peak	Spacewatch	EOS	1.6 km	MPC · JPL
701389	2004 TW_{141}	—	September 10, 2004	Saint-Véran	St. Veran	·	910 m	MPC · JPL
701390	2004 TL_{151}	—	September 10, 2004	Kitt Peak	Spacewatch	·	510 m	MPC · JPL
701391	2004 TU_{159}	—	October 6, 2004	Kitt Peak	Spacewatch	·	1.3 km	MPC · JPL
701392	2004 TF_{165}	—	October 7, 2004	Kitt Peak	Spacewatch	EOS	1.5 km	MPC · JPL
701393	2004 TK_{171}	—	October 8, 2004	Socorro	LINEAR	·	870 m	MPC · JPL
701394	2004 TO_{171}	—	October 8, 2004	Socorro	LINEAR	·	620 m	MPC · JPL
701395	2004 TM_{195}	—	October 7, 2004	Kitt Peak	Spacewatch	·	650 m	MPC · JPL
701396	2004 TS_{199}	—	October 7, 2004	Kitt Peak	Spacewatch	EOS	1.7 km	MPC · JPL
701397	2004 TP_{211}	—	October 8, 2004	Kitt Peak	Spacewatch	·	1.0 km	MPC · JPL
701398	2004 TY_{213}	—	October 9, 2004	Kitt Peak	Spacewatch	KOR	1.1 km	MPC · JPL
701399	2004 TR_{232}	—	October 8, 2004	Kitt Peak	Spacewatch	·	960 m	MPC · JPL
701400	2004 TX_{235}	—	October 8, 2004	Kitt Peak	Spacewatch	EOS	1.7 km	MPC · JPL

== 701401–701500 ==
back to top

Designation			Discovery			Properties		Ref
Permanent	Provisional	Named after	Date	Site	Discoverer(s)	Category	Diam.	Ref
701401	2004 TV_{259}	—	October 9, 2004	Kitt Peak	Spacewatch	·	2.1 km	MPC · JPL
701402	2004 TD_{290}	—	October 10, 2004	Kitt Peak	Spacewatch	·	520 m	MPC · JPL
701403	2004 TN_{291}	—	October 10, 2004	Kitt Peak	Spacewatch	·	1.4 km	MPC · JPL
701404	2004 TP_{299}	—	October 8, 2004	Kitt Peak	Spacewatch	·	1.4 km	MPC · JPL
701405	2004 TV_{311}	—	October 11, 2004	Kitt Peak	Spacewatch	·	1.4 km	MPC · JPL
701406	2004 TO_{314}	—	September 10, 2004	Kitt Peak	Spacewatch	·	1.3 km	MPC · JPL
701407	2004 TC_{317}	—	October 11, 2004	Kitt Peak	Spacewatch	NYS	1.0 km	MPC · JPL
701408	2004 TK_{320}	—	October 11, 2004	Kitt Peak	Spacewatch	·	1.9 km	MPC · JPL
701409	2004 TD_{329}	—	September 7, 2004	Kitt Peak	Spacewatch	·	2.5 km	MPC · JPL
701410	2004 TX_{337}	—	October 4, 2004	Kitt Peak	Spacewatch	·	2.1 km	MPC · JPL
701411	2004 TU_{361}	—	October 13, 2004	Kitt Peak	Spacewatch	·	1.9 km	MPC · JPL
701412	2004 TK_{368}	—	March 13, 2007	Mount Lemmon	Mount Lemmon Survey	·	1.1 km	MPC · JPL
701413	2004 TE_{373}	—	April 16, 2013	Haleakala	Pan-STARRS 1	EMA	3.4 km	MPC · JPL
701414	2004 TP_{373}	—	October 5, 2004	Palomar	NEAT	·	1.7 km	MPC · JPL
701415	2004 TX_{373}	—	October 9, 2004	Kitt Peak	Spacewatch	·	1.1 km	MPC · JPL
701416	2004 TM_{374}	—	October 9, 2004	Kitt Peak	Spacewatch	·	3.0 km	MPC · JPL
701417	2004 TR_{374}	—	October 13, 2015	Haleakala	Pan-STARRS 1	T_{j} (2.99)	3.5 km	MPC · JPL
701418	2004 TV_{374}	—	September 28, 2011	Mount Lemmon	Mount Lemmon Survey	(2076)	700 m	MPC · JPL
701419	2004 TU_{375}	—	October 23, 2004	Kitt Peak	Spacewatch	·	2.7 km	MPC · JPL
701420	2004 TC_{376}	—	April 5, 2014	Haleakala	Pan-STARRS 1	·	2.9 km	MPC · JPL
701421	2004 TG_{377}	—	September 23, 2011	Haleakala	Pan-STARRS 1	·	590 m	MPC · JPL
701422	2004 TU_{377}	—	June 29, 2014	Haleakala	Pan-STARRS 1	·	630 m	MPC · JPL
701423	2004 TV_{377}	—	January 26, 2014	Haleakala	Pan-STARRS 1	·	780 m	MPC · JPL
701424 Piotrguzik	2004 TX_{378}	Piotrguzik	December 2, 2013	Tincana	M. Kusiak, M. Żolnowski	·	1.5 km	MPC · JPL
701425	2004 TE_{379}	—	September 24, 2009	Mount Lemmon	Mount Lemmon Survey	·	1.6 km	MPC · JPL
701426	2004 TG_{379}	—	October 15, 2004	Mount Lemmon	Mount Lemmon Survey	·	2.0 km	MPC · JPL
701427	2004 TO_{379}	—	August 28, 2014	Haleakala	Pan-STARRS 1	·	1.7 km	MPC · JPL
701428	2004 TD_{380}	—	October 16, 2009	Mount Lemmon	Mount Lemmon Survey	·	1.7 km	MPC · JPL
701429	2004 TM_{382}	—	December 5, 2008	Kitt Peak	Spacewatch	·	770 m	MPC · JPL
701430	2004 TQ_{383}	—	October 14, 2004	Kitt Peak	Spacewatch	EOS	1.4 km	MPC · JPL
701431	2004 TX_{383}	—	November 8, 2009	Mount Lemmon	Mount Lemmon Survey	·	1.5 km	MPC · JPL
701432	2004 TS_{384}	—	October 26, 2011	Haleakala	Pan-STARRS 1	·	600 m	MPC · JPL
701433	2004 TX_{384}	—	October 10, 2004	Kitt Peak	Deep Ecliptic Survey	EOS	1.2 km	MPC · JPL
701434	2004 TF_{385}	—	October 7, 2004	Kitt Peak	Spacewatch	·	2.7 km	MPC · JPL
701435	2004 TL_{386}	—	October 15, 2004	Mount Lemmon	Mount Lemmon Survey	·	750 m	MPC · JPL
701436	2004 TN_{386}	—	October 11, 2004	Kitt Peak	Deep Ecliptic Survey	EOS	1.2 km	MPC · JPL
701437	2004 VD_{43}	—	November 4, 2004	Kitt Peak	Spacewatch	EOS	1.2 km	MPC · JPL
701438	2004 VB_{49}	—	November 4, 2004	Kitt Peak	Spacewatch	·	1.4 km	MPC · JPL
701439	2004 VH_{67}	—	October 23, 2004	Kitt Peak	Spacewatch	NYS	1.1 km	MPC · JPL
701440	2004 VW_{82}	—	October 23, 2004	Kitt Peak	Spacewatch	·	2.6 km	MPC · JPL
701441	2004 VC_{84}	—	November 10, 2004	Kitt Peak	Spacewatch	3:2	3.2 km	MPC · JPL
701442	2004 VE_{93}	—	November 9, 2004	Kitt Peak	M. W. Buie, Wasserman, L. H.	·	2.4 km	MPC · JPL
701443	2004 VZ_{95}	—	November 11, 2004	Kitt Peak	Spacewatch	·	2.2 km	MPC · JPL
701444	2004 VA_{98}	—	November 9, 2004	Mauna Kea	Veillet, C.	·	1.3 km	MPC · JPL
701445	2004 VY_{99}	—	November 9, 2004	Mauna Kea	Veillet, C.	·	780 m	MPC · JPL
701446	2004 VG_{101}	—	November 9, 2004	Mauna Kea	Veillet, C.	MAS	680 m	MPC · JPL
701447	2004 VN_{104}	—	March 11, 2003	Palomar	NEAT	·	740 m	MPC · JPL
701448	2004 VT_{104}	—	October 18, 2004	Kitt Peak	Deep Ecliptic Survey	(2076)	500 m	MPC · JPL
701449	2004 VA_{105}	—	November 9, 2004	Mauna Kea	Veillet, C.	·	1.1 km	MPC · JPL
701450	2004 VX_{107}	—	November 9, 2004	Mauna Kea	Veillet, C.	·	950 m	MPC · JPL
701451	2004 VB_{108}	—	October 18, 2004	Kitt Peak	Deep Ecliptic Survey	HOF	1.9 km	MPC · JPL
701452	2004 VG_{109}	—	November 9, 2004	Mauna Kea	Veillet, C.	KOR	1.1 km	MPC · JPL
701453	2004 VN_{109}	—	November 9, 2004	Mauna Kea	Veillet, C.	·	2.2 km	MPC · JPL
701454	2004 VB_{113}	—	November 9, 2004	Mauna Kea	P. A. Wiegert, A. Papadimos	·	770 m	MPC · JPL
701455	2004 VL_{114}	—	November 9, 2004	Mauna Kea	P. A. Wiegert, A. Papadimos	·	1.8 km	MPC · JPL
701456	2004 VR_{117}	—	November 9, 2004	Mauna Kea	P. A. Wiegert, A. Papadimos	MAS	540 m	MPC · JPL
701457	2004 VE_{132}	—	September 9, 2013	Haleakala	Pan-STARRS 1	(16286)	1.8 km	MPC · JPL
701458	2004 VJ_{132}	—	August 28, 2014	ESA OGS	ESA OGS	·	650 m	MPC · JPL
701459	2004 VP_{132}	—	November 10, 2004	Kitt Peak	Spacewatch	·	2.3 km	MPC · JPL
701460	2004 VW_{132}	—	September 29, 2009	Mount Lemmon	Mount Lemmon Survey	·	1.7 km	MPC · JPL
701461	2004 VB_{135}	—	September 25, 2013	Mount Lemmon	Mount Lemmon Survey	KOR	1.4 km	MPC · JPL
701462	2004 VQ_{135}	—	January 3, 2009	Mount Lemmon	Mount Lemmon Survey	(2076)	740 m	MPC · JPL
701463	2004 VC_{137}	—	September 19, 2014	Haleakala	Pan-STARRS 1	EOS	1.6 km	MPC · JPL
701464	2004 VZ_{137}	—	November 11, 2004	Kitt Peak	Spacewatch	(2076)	640 m	MPC · JPL
701465	2004 WS_{13}	—	December 28, 2017	Mount Lemmon	Mount Lemmon Survey	·	1.2 km	MPC · JPL
701466	2004 WT_{13}	—	October 12, 2009	Mount Lemmon	Mount Lemmon Survey	TEL	1.0 km	MPC · JPL
701467	2004 XV_{58}	—	December 10, 2004	Kitt Peak	Spacewatch	·	1.5 km	MPC · JPL
701468	2004 XX_{66}	—	December 3, 2004	Kitt Peak	Spacewatch	·	2.0 km	MPC · JPL
701469	2004 XF_{88}	—	December 10, 2004	Kitt Peak	Spacewatch	·	1.2 km	MPC · JPL
701470	2004 XG_{114}	—	December 10, 2004	Kitt Peak	Spacewatch	EOS	1.5 km	MPC · JPL
701471	2004 XQ_{115}	—	December 11, 2004	Kitt Peak	Spacewatch	·	890 m	MPC · JPL
701472	2004 XV_{141}	—	December 14, 2004	Catalina	CSS	·	1.5 km	MPC · JPL
701473	2004 XH_{149}	—	December 15, 2004	Kitt Peak	Spacewatch	·	2.9 km	MPC · JPL
701474	2004 XQ_{158}	—	December 14, 2004	Kitt Peak	Spacewatch	·	1.4 km	MPC · JPL
701475	2004 XG_{185}	—	December 11, 2004	Kitt Peak	Spacewatch	·	910 m	MPC · JPL
701476	2004 XA_{195}	—	October 30, 2009	Mount Lemmon	Mount Lemmon Survey	EOS	1.8 km	MPC · JPL
701477	2004 XR_{195}	—	September 19, 2014	Haleakala	Pan-STARRS 1	·	2.0 km	MPC · JPL
701478	2004 XV_{196}	—	November 30, 2011	Kitt Peak	Spacewatch	·	820 m	MPC · JPL
701479	2004 XJ_{197}	—	August 13, 2012	Haleakala	Pan-STARRS 1	·	1.2 km	MPC · JPL
701480	2004 XK_{197}	—	August 20, 2014	Haleakala	Pan-STARRS 1	·	600 m	MPC · JPL
701481	2004 YF_{15}	—	December 19, 2004	Mount Lemmon	Mount Lemmon Survey	L5	8.7 km	MPC · JPL
701482	2004 YK_{15}	—	December 19, 2004	Mount Lemmon	Mount Lemmon Survey	L5	7.5 km	MPC · JPL
701483	2004 YR_{37}	—	December 19, 2004	Mount Lemmon	Mount Lemmon Survey	(5)	1.1 km	MPC · JPL
701484	2004 YT_{37}	—	December 20, 2004	Mount Lemmon	Mount Lemmon Survey	MAR	1.1 km	MPC · JPL
701485	2004 YW_{37}	—	January 2, 2012	Kitt Peak	Spacewatch	·	680 m	MPC · JPL
701486	2004 YX_{37}	—	December 21, 2004	Kitt Peak	Spacewatch	PHO	1.0 km	MPC · JPL
701487	2004 YD_{38}	—	October 28, 2008	Catalina	CSS	EUN	1.0 km	MPC · JPL
701488	2004 YO_{38}	—	January 4, 2013	Mount Lemmon	Mount Lemmon Survey	·	1.2 km	MPC · JPL
701489	2004 YW_{38}	—	March 14, 2012	Catalina	CSS	·	3.4 km	MPC · JPL
701490	2004 YB_{39}	—	September 25, 1995	Kitt Peak	Spacewatch	·	1.0 km	MPC · JPL
701491	2004 YA_{40}	—	December 11, 2013	Haleakala	Pan-STARRS 1	·	1.1 km	MPC · JPL
701492	2004 YB_{40}	—	November 21, 2017	Haleakala	Pan-STARRS 1	·	1.2 km	MPC · JPL
701493	2004 YN_{40}	—	January 13, 2018	Mount Lemmon	Mount Lemmon Survey	·	3.6 km	MPC · JPL
701494	2004 YX_{40}	—	October 28, 2008	Mount Lemmon	Mount Lemmon Survey	·	1.0 km	MPC · JPL
701495	2004 YS_{41}	—	December 19, 2004	Mount Lemmon	Mount Lemmon Survey	MAR	840 m	MPC · JPL
701496	2004 YC_{42}	—	December 18, 2004	Mount Lemmon	Mount Lemmon Survey	·	1.2 km	MPC · JPL
701497	2005 AQ_{59}	—	January 15, 2005	Kitt Peak	Spacewatch	·	730 m	MPC · JPL
701498	2005 AC_{60}	—	January 15, 2005	Kitt Peak	Spacewatch	·	1.3 km	MPC · JPL
701499	2005 AB_{64}	—	January 13, 2005	Kitt Peak	Spacewatch	·	1.4 km	MPC · JPL
701500	2005 AO_{74}	—	January 15, 2005	Kitt Peak	Spacewatch	EOS	2.0 km	MPC · JPL

== 701501–701600 ==
back to top

Designation			Discovery			Properties		Ref
Permanent	Provisional	Named after	Date	Site	Discoverer(s)	Category	Diam.	Ref
701501	2005 AM_{83}	—	December 11, 2004	Catalina	CSS	·	1.4 km	MPC · JPL
701502	2005 AH_{84}	—	December 12, 2012	Haleakala	Pan-STARRS 1	(194)	1.5 km	MPC · JPL
701503	2005 AK_{84}	—	December 23, 2013	Mount Lemmon	Mount Lemmon Survey	·	1.5 km	MPC · JPL
701504	2005 AT_{84}	—	October 30, 2014	Mount Lemmon	Mount Lemmon Survey	EOS	1.4 km	MPC · JPL
701505	2005 AX_{84}	—	January 19, 2016	Mount Lemmon	Mount Lemmon Survey	·	750 m	MPC · JPL
701506	2005 BV_{19}	—	January 16, 2005	Kitt Peak	Spacewatch	·	2.7 km	MPC · JPL
701507	2005 BR_{21}	—	January 16, 2005	Kitt Peak	Spacewatch	MAR	1.0 km	MPC · JPL
701508	2005 BJ_{30}	—	January 16, 2005	Mauna Kea	Veillet, C.	·	1.3 km	MPC · JPL
701509	2005 BD_{32}	—	January 16, 2005	Mauna Kea	Veillet, C.	·	2.7 km	MPC · JPL
701510	2005 BS_{33}	—	January 16, 2005	Mauna Kea	Veillet, C.	·	1.4 km	MPC · JPL
701511	2005 BE_{35}	—	January 16, 2005	Mauna Kea	Veillet, C.	·	790 m	MPC · JPL
701512	2005 BR_{37}	—	January 16, 2005	Mauna Kea	Veillet, C.	EOS	1.4 km	MPC · JPL
701513	2005 BL_{38}	—	December 16, 2003	Mauna Kea	D. D. Balam	·	1.9 km	MPC · JPL
701514	2005 BA_{40}	—	March 10, 2005	Mount Lemmon	Mount Lemmon Survey	(5)	1.2 km	MPC · JPL
701515	2005 BE_{42}	—	January 16, 2005	Mauna Kea	Veillet, C.	·	1.7 km	MPC · JPL
701516	2005 BK_{43}	—	January 16, 2005	Mauna Kea	Veillet, C.	KOR	940 m	MPC · JPL
701517	2005 BO_{45}	—	January 16, 2005	Mauna Kea	Veillet, C.	·	1.3 km	MPC · JPL
701518	2005 BQ_{45}	—	January 16, 2005	Mauna Kea	Veillet, C.	THM	1.8 km	MPC · JPL
701519	2005 BD_{51}	—	October 8, 2008	Mount Lemmon	Mount Lemmon Survey	EOS	2.0 km	MPC · JPL
701520	2005 BE_{51}	—	March 21, 2015	Haleakala	Pan-STARRS 1	·	1.6 km	MPC · JPL
701521	2005 BM_{51}	—	June 9, 2016	Haleakala	Pan-STARRS 1	H	380 m	MPC · JPL
701522	2005 BQ_{51}	—	November 1, 2008	Mount Lemmon	Mount Lemmon Survey	(5)	1.2 km	MPC · JPL
701523	2005 BZ_{51}	—	October 20, 2011	Mount Lemmon	Mount Lemmon Survey	MAS	540 m	MPC · JPL
701524	2005 BG_{52}	—	March 19, 2009	Kitt Peak	Spacewatch	NYS	740 m	MPC · JPL
701525	2005 BW_{52}	—	February 28, 2009	Mount Lemmon	Mount Lemmon Survey	·	880 m	MPC · JPL
701526	2005 BQ_{54}	—	October 29, 2017	Haleakala	Pan-STARRS 1	H	560 m	MPC · JPL
701527	2005 BT_{54}	—	January 17, 2005	Kitt Peak	Spacewatch	·	1.1 km	MPC · JPL
701528	2005 BH_{55}	—	November 21, 2008	Mount Lemmon	Mount Lemmon Survey	WIT	730 m	MPC · JPL
701529	2005 BJ_{55}	—	October 28, 2008	Mount Lemmon	Mount Lemmon Survey	·	1.2 km	MPC · JPL
701530	2005 BM_{55}	—	April 26, 2009	Mount Lemmon	Mount Lemmon Survey	NYS	750 m	MPC · JPL
701531	2005 BO_{57}	—	September 29, 2019	Mount Lemmon	Mount Lemmon Survey	·	2.4 km	MPC · JPL
701532	2005 CQ_{3}	—	February 1, 2005	Kitt Peak	Spacewatch	EOS	1.8 km	MPC · JPL
701533	2005 CS_{17}	—	February 2, 2005	Kitt Peak	Spacewatch	·	1.2 km	MPC · JPL
701534	2005 CL_{35}	—	February 2, 2005	Kitt Peak	Spacewatch	·	1.0 km	MPC · JPL
701535	2005 CZ_{38}	—	February 9, 2005	La Silla	A. Boattini	·	1.4 km	MPC · JPL
701536	2005 CM_{40}	—	February 9, 2005	La Silla	A. Boattini	·	2.5 km	MPC · JPL
701537	2005 CQ_{40}	—	February 9, 2005	La Silla	A. Boattini, H. Scholl	·	1.3 km	MPC · JPL
701538	2005 CZ_{40}	—	February 9, 2005	La Silla	A. Boattini	·	2.4 km	MPC · JPL
701539	2005 CB_{70}	—	February 8, 2005	Mauna Kea	Veillet, C.	·	1.2 km	MPC · JPL
701540	2005 CC_{77}	—	February 9, 2005	Socorro	LINEAR	·	2.6 km	MPC · JPL
701541	2005 CM_{82}	—	February 2, 2005	Kitt Peak	Spacewatch	·	1.1 km	MPC · JPL
701542	2005 CX_{82}	—	September 5, 2010	Mount Lemmon	Mount Lemmon Survey	·	520 m	MPC · JPL
701543	2005 CE_{83}	—	December 28, 2011	Mount Lemmon	Mount Lemmon Survey	·	640 m	MPC · JPL
701544	2005 CT_{83}	—	August 4, 2013	Haleakala	Pan-STARRS 1	·	2.4 km	MPC · JPL
701545	2005 CZ_{83}	—	August 10, 2016	Haleakala	Pan-STARRS 1	·	1.2 km	MPC · JPL
701546	2005 CE_{84}	—	September 13, 2007	Mount Lemmon	Mount Lemmon Survey	URS	2.7 km	MPC · JPL
701547	2005 CN_{84}	—	February 14, 2005	Kitt Peak	Spacewatch	·	1.3 km	MPC · JPL
701548	2005 CR_{84}	—	January 3, 2014	Mount Lemmon	Mount Lemmon Survey	DOR	1.6 km	MPC · JPL
701549	2005 CZ_{84}	—	August 13, 2014	Haleakala	Pan-STARRS 1	H	480 m	MPC · JPL
701550	2005 CG_{85}	—	March 25, 2012	Mount Lemmon	Mount Lemmon Survey	·	600 m	MPC · JPL
701551	2005 CJ_{85}	—	October 18, 2012	Haleakala	Pan-STARRS 1	·	1.3 km	MPC · JPL
701552	2005 CM_{85}	—	February 9, 2005	Kitt Peak	Spacewatch	·	1.3 km	MPC · JPL
701553	2005 CA_{87}	—	October 1, 2008	Catalina	CSS	·	2.0 km	MPC · JPL
701554	2005 CO_{87}	—	January 28, 2016	Mount Lemmon	Mount Lemmon Survey	·	2.3 km	MPC · JPL
701555	2005 CH_{88}	—	September 10, 2007	Mount Lemmon	Mount Lemmon Survey	·	1.3 km	MPC · JPL
701556	2005 CH_{89}	—	February 2, 2005	Kitt Peak	Spacewatch	·	1.1 km	MPC · JPL
701557	2005 DD_{2}	—	February 18, 2005	La Silla	A. Boattini	·	1.5 km	MPC · JPL
701558	2005 DW_{3}	—	August 27, 2006	Kitt Peak	Spacewatch	THM	2.0 km	MPC · JPL
701559	2005 DF_{4}	—	October 24, 2011	Haleakala	Pan-STARRS 1	EUN	900 m	MPC · JPL
701560	2005 EP_{47}	—	March 3, 2005	Kitt Peak	Spacewatch	·	1.1 km	MPC · JPL
701561	2005 EH_{52}	—	February 2, 2005	Kitt Peak	Spacewatch	·	2.4 km	MPC · JPL
701562	2005 EG_{53}	—	September 25, 2003	Palomar	NEAT	EUN	1.0 km	MPC · JPL
701563	2005 EA_{58}	—	March 4, 2005	Mount Lemmon	Mount Lemmon Survey	EOS	1.8 km	MPC · JPL
701564	2005 ER_{59}	—	January 9, 2016	Haleakala	Pan-STARRS 1	MAS	470 m	MPC · JPL
701565	2005 ES_{88}	—	March 8, 2005	Kitt Peak	Spacewatch	·	870 m	MPC · JPL
701566	2005 EO_{92}	—	March 8, 2005	Mount Lemmon	Mount Lemmon Survey	·	2.1 km	MPC · JPL
701567	2005 EN_{104}	—	January 18, 2016	Mount Lemmon	Mount Lemmon Survey	·	2.6 km	MPC · JPL
701568	2005 EV_{104}	—	January 17, 2005	Kitt Peak	Spacewatch	·	3.2 km	MPC · JPL
701569	2005 ES_{109}	—	March 4, 2005	Mount Lemmon	Mount Lemmon Survey	THM	2.0 km	MPC · JPL
701570	2005 EP_{128}	—	March 9, 2005	Kitt Peak	Spacewatch	·	2.0 km	MPC · JPL
701571	2005 EQ_{128}	—	March 9, 2005	Kitt Peak	Spacewatch	·	2.9 km	MPC · JPL
701572	2005 EO_{131}	—	March 9, 2005	Mount Lemmon	Mount Lemmon Survey	·	2.4 km	MPC · JPL
701573	2005 EE_{140}	—	March 1, 2005	Kitt Peak	Spacewatch	ADE	1.5 km	MPC · JPL
701574	2005 EO_{167}	—	March 11, 2005	Mount Lemmon	Mount Lemmon Survey	·	1.2 km	MPC · JPL
701575	2005 EV_{172}	—	March 8, 2005	Kitt Peak	Spacewatch	·	2.9 km	MPC · JPL
701576	2005 EJ_{176}	—	March 8, 2005	Mount Lemmon	Mount Lemmon Survey	EOS	1.6 km	MPC · JPL
701577	2005 EF_{186}	—	March 10, 2005	Catalina	CSS	·	2.4 km	MPC · JPL
701578	2005 EC_{197}	—	March 11, 2005	Mount Lemmon	Mount Lemmon Survey	·	1.4 km	MPC · JPL
701579	2005 EH_{207}	—	March 13, 2005	Mount Lemmon	Mount Lemmon Survey	·	2.2 km	MPC · JPL
701580	2005 EF_{209}	—	March 4, 2005	Mount Lemmon	Mount Lemmon Survey	·	2.4 km	MPC · JPL
701581	2005 ET_{229}	—	October 11, 2010	Catalina	CSS	·	590 m	MPC · JPL
701582	2005 EW_{230}	—	May 9, 2006	Mount Lemmon	Mount Lemmon Survey	·	2.4 km	MPC · JPL
701583	2005 EA_{235}	—	March 10, 2005	Mount Lemmon	Mount Lemmon Survey	·	1.1 km	MPC · JPL
701584	2005 EL_{236}	—	March 10, 2005	Mount Lemmon	Mount Lemmon Survey	·	1.3 km	MPC · JPL
701585	2005 EN_{236}	—	September 21, 2012	Mount Lemmon	Mount Lemmon Survey	·	1.6 km	MPC · JPL
701586	2005 EO_{236}	—	March 10, 2005	Mount Lemmon	Mount Lemmon Survey	·	670 m	MPC · JPL
701587	2005 EL_{248}	—	March 12, 2005	Kitt Peak	Spacewatch	EUN	900 m	MPC · JPL
701588	2005 EX_{249}	—	January 13, 2005	Kitt Peak	Spacewatch	·	850 m	MPC · JPL
701589	2005 EH_{258}	—	March 11, 2005	Mount Lemmon	Mount Lemmon Survey	EOS	1.7 km	MPC · JPL
701590	2005 ET_{260}	—	March 12, 2005	Socorro	LINEAR	·	1.2 km	MPC · JPL
701591	2005 EM_{261}	—	March 13, 2005	Kitt Peak	Spacewatch	·	1.3 km	MPC · JPL
701592	2005 EB_{269}	—	March 14, 2005	Mount Lemmon	Mount Lemmon Survey	·	2.2 km	MPC · JPL
701593	2005 EV_{299}	—	March 10, 2005	Mount Lemmon	Mount Lemmon Survey	·	1.5 km	MPC · JPL
701594	2005 EY_{301}	—	March 12, 2005	Mount Lemmon	Mount Lemmon Survey	·	2.0 km	MPC · JPL
701595	2005 EA_{304}	—	March 11, 2005	Kitt Peak	Deep Ecliptic Survey	·	2.6 km	MPC · JPL
701596	2005 EQ_{307}	—	March 8, 2005	Mount Lemmon	Mount Lemmon Survey	·	1.4 km	MPC · JPL
701597	2005 EV_{309}	—	March 9, 2005	Mount Lemmon	Mount Lemmon Survey	·	1.1 km	MPC · JPL
701598	2005 EA_{310}	—	March 10, 2005	Mount Lemmon	Mount Lemmon Survey	·	2.3 km	MPC · JPL
701599	2005 EF_{334}	—	March 3, 2005	Catalina	CSS	NYS	1.1 km	MPC · JPL
701600	2005 EU_{334}	—	March 14, 2005	Mount Lemmon	Mount Lemmon Survey	NYS	940 m	MPC · JPL

== 701601–701700 ==
back to top

Designation			Discovery			Properties		Ref
Permanent	Provisional	Named after	Date	Site	Discoverer(s)	Category	Diam.	Ref
701601	2005 EB_{336}	—	March 11, 2005	Mount Lemmon	Mount Lemmon Survey	·	1.4 km	MPC · JPL
701602	2005 EF_{336}	—	November 8, 2008	Mount Lemmon	Mount Lemmon Survey	THM	2.2 km	MPC · JPL
701603	2005 EQ_{336}	—	March 2, 2012	Kitt Peak	Spacewatch	BAP	720 m	MPC · JPL
701604	2005 EW_{336}	—	November 3, 2007	Kitt Peak	Spacewatch	NYS	690 m	MPC · JPL
701605	2005 EY_{336}	—	November 26, 2012	Mount Lemmon	Mount Lemmon Survey	MRX	830 m	MPC · JPL
701606	2005 EB_{337}	—	March 12, 2005	Kitt Peak	Spacewatch	MAS	660 m	MPC · JPL
701607	2005 EH_{337}	—	March 10, 2005	Catalina	CSS	·	2.6 km	MPC · JPL
701608	2005 EA_{338}	—	December 13, 2015	Haleakala	Pan-STARRS 1	·	2.9 km	MPC · JPL
701609	2005 EM_{338}	—	December 31, 2011	Kitt Peak	Spacewatch	·	880 m	MPC · JPL
701610	2005 ES_{339}	—	January 29, 2009	Mount Lemmon	Mount Lemmon Survey	·	1.2 km	MPC · JPL
701611	2005 EV_{339}	—	March 8, 2014	Mount Lemmon	Mount Lemmon Survey	HNS	850 m	MPC · JPL
701612	2005 EH_{340}	—	October 23, 2003	Apache Point	SDSS	·	1.4 km	MPC · JPL
701613	2005 ER_{340}	—	September 13, 2007	Mount Lemmon	Mount Lemmon Survey	·	1.5 km	MPC · JPL
701614	2005 EV_{340}	—	September 24, 2008	Mount Lemmon	Mount Lemmon Survey	·	2.5 km	MPC · JPL
701615	2005 EX_{340}	—	March 10, 2005	Mount Lemmon	Mount Lemmon Survey	EOS	1.6 km	MPC · JPL
701616	2005 EC_{341}	—	August 28, 2013	Mount Lemmon	Mount Lemmon Survey	·	2.4 km	MPC · JPL
701617	2005 EG_{341}	—	October 3, 2013	Mount Lemmon	Mount Lemmon Survey	·	2.5 km	MPC · JPL
701618	2005 EN_{341}	—	March 6, 2016	Haleakala	Pan-STARRS 1	·	940 m	MPC · JPL
701619	2005 EO_{341}	—	September 11, 2007	Kitt Peak	Spacewatch	·	2.6 km	MPC · JPL
701620	2005 EQ_{341}	—	January 26, 2015	Haleakala	Pan-STARRS 1	·	1.5 km	MPC · JPL
701621	2005 ES_{341}	—	February 25, 2018	Mount Lemmon	Mount Lemmon Survey	·	1.3 km	MPC · JPL
701622	2005 ER_{342}	—	March 11, 2005	Mount Lemmon	Mount Lemmon Survey	V	520 m	MPC · JPL
701623	2005 EK_{344}	—	September 28, 2011	Mount Lemmon	Mount Lemmon Survey	·	1.2 km	MPC · JPL
701624	2005 EH_{346}	—	February 5, 2016	Haleakala	Pan-STARRS 1	·	870 m	MPC · JPL
701625	2005 EG_{348}	—	March 4, 2005	Kitt Peak	Spacewatch	·	1.7 km	MPC · JPL
701626	2005 FE_{17}	—	March 17, 2005	Kitt Peak	Spacewatch	EOS	1.6 km	MPC · JPL
701627	2005 FN_{17}	—	February 2, 2008	Mount Lemmon	Mount Lemmon Survey	·	670 m	MPC · JPL
701628	2005 FX_{17}	—	February 2, 2016	Haleakala	Pan-STARRS 1	·	3.1 km	MPC · JPL
701629	2005 FA_{18}	—	January 29, 2009	Mount Lemmon	Mount Lemmon Survey	·	1.5 km	MPC · JPL
701630	2005 FW_{18}	—	December 23, 2017	Haleakala	Pan-STARRS 1	WIT	760 m	MPC · JPL
701631	2005 FJ_{19}	—	March 13, 2012	Mount Lemmon	Mount Lemmon Survey	·	650 m	MPC · JPL
701632	2005 FU_{20}	—	March 29, 2019	Mount Lemmon	Mount Lemmon Survey	AGN	820 m	MPC · JPL
701633	2005 GK_{25}	—	April 2, 2005	Mount Lemmon	Mount Lemmon Survey	·	1.4 km	MPC · JPL
701634	2005 GL_{25}	—	April 2, 2005	Mount Lemmon	Mount Lemmon Survey	·	740 m	MPC · JPL
701635	2005 GA_{36}	—	March 16, 2005	Kitt Peak	Spacewatch	·	880 m	MPC · JPL
701636	2005 GY_{67}	—	April 2, 2005	Mount Lemmon	Mount Lemmon Survey	PHO	880 m	MPC · JPL
701637	2005 GN_{81}	—	March 12, 2005	Kitt Peak	Spacewatch	·	1.2 km	MPC · JPL
701638	2005 GS_{83}	—	April 4, 2005	Kitt Peak	Spacewatch	·	880 m	MPC · JPL
701639	2005 GZ_{84}	—	April 4, 2005	Kitt Peak	Spacewatch	·	830 m	MPC · JPL
701640	2005 GG_{94}	—	April 6, 2005	Mount Lemmon	Mount Lemmon Survey	·	2.1 km	MPC · JPL
701641	2005 GK_{94}	—	April 6, 2005	Kitt Peak	Spacewatch	·	1.9 km	MPC · JPL
701642	2005 GK_{96}	—	April 6, 2005	Mount Lemmon	Mount Lemmon Survey	·	2.5 km	MPC · JPL
701643	2005 GL_{96}	—	April 6, 2005	Mount Lemmon	Mount Lemmon Survey	·	870 m	MPC · JPL
701644	2005 GF_{101}	—	April 9, 2005	Kitt Peak	Spacewatch	·	910 m	MPC · JPL
701645	2005 GZ_{105}	—	April 10, 2005	Kitt Peak	Spacewatch	·	2.5 km	MPC · JPL
701646	2005 GL_{106}	—	April 10, 2005	Mount Lemmon	Mount Lemmon Survey	EOS	1.6 km	MPC · JPL
701647	2005 GL_{109}	—	April 10, 2005	Mount Lemmon	Mount Lemmon Survey	·	2.7 km	MPC · JPL
701648	2005 GV_{121}	—	April 6, 2005	Mount Lemmon	Mount Lemmon Survey	·	590 m	MPC · JPL
701649	2005 GU_{133}	—	April 2, 2005	Kitt Peak	Spacewatch	ERI	1.2 km	MPC · JPL
701650	2005 GE_{135}	—	April 10, 2005	Mount Lemmon	Mount Lemmon Survey	·	1.3 km	MPC · JPL
701651	2005 GV_{139}	—	April 12, 2005	Mount Lemmon	Mount Lemmon Survey	·	710 m	MPC · JPL
701652	2005 GX_{144}	—	April 11, 2005	Kitt Peak	Spacewatch	·	1.7 km	MPC · JPL
701653	2005 GE_{147}	—	April 11, 2005	Kitt Peak	Spacewatch	·	900 m	MPC · JPL
701654	2005 GD_{158}	—	April 12, 2005	Kitt Peak	Spacewatch	·	590 m	MPC · JPL
701655	2005 GB_{160}	—	April 12, 2005	Kitt Peak	Spacewatch	·	920 m	MPC · JPL
701656	2005 GD_{168}	—	April 11, 2005	Mount Lemmon	Mount Lemmon Survey	·	1.7 km	MPC · JPL
701657	2005 GP_{169}	—	April 2, 2005	Mount Lemmon	Mount Lemmon Survey	·	2.6 km	MPC · JPL
701658	2005 GE_{183}	—	April 10, 2005	Kitt Peak	Deep Ecliptic Survey	·	2.4 km	MPC · JPL
701659	2005 GU_{188}	—	March 8, 2005	Mount Lemmon	Mount Lemmon Survey	·	1.1 km	MPC · JPL
701660	2005 GD_{196}	—	April 10, 2005	Kitt Peak	Deep Ecliptic Survey	·	2.3 km	MPC · JPL
701661	2005 GK_{202}	—	April 5, 2005	Mount Lemmon	Mount Lemmon Survey	·	1.6 km	MPC · JPL
701662	2005 GX_{217}	—	April 2, 2005	Mount Lemmon	Mount Lemmon Survey	·	1.6 km	MPC · JPL
701663	2005 GB_{220}	—	March 10, 2005	Kitt Peak	M. W. Buie, Wasserman, L. H.	AEO	790 m	MPC · JPL
701664	2005 GY_{220}	—	April 6, 2005	Kitt Peak	Spacewatch	·	1.4 km	MPC · JPL
701665	2005 GO_{222}	—	April 10, 2005	Kitt Peak	Spacewatch	·	2.8 km	MPC · JPL
701666	2005 GD_{229}	—	March 11, 2005	Kitt Peak	Spacewatch	EOS	2.0 km	MPC · JPL
701667	2005 GC_{230}	—	April 4, 2005	Mount Lemmon	Mount Lemmon Survey	·	560 m	MPC · JPL
701668	2005 GU_{230}	—	August 26, 2012	Haleakala	Pan-STARRS 1	EOS	1.7 km	MPC · JPL
701669	2005 GX_{230}	—	April 11, 2005	Kitt Peak	Spacewatch	·	1.6 km	MPC · JPL
701670	2005 GM_{231}	—	September 21, 2009	Kitt Peak	Spacewatch	·	560 m	MPC · JPL
701671	2005 GR_{231}	—	December 6, 2007	Mount Lemmon	Mount Lemmon Survey	NYS	960 m	MPC · JPL
701672	2005 GK_{232}	—	October 3, 2013	Haleakala	Pan-STARRS 1	·	2.8 km	MPC · JPL
701673	2005 GB_{233}	—	September 11, 2007	Mount Lemmon	Mount Lemmon Survey	·	2.3 km	MPC · JPL
701674	2005 GK_{234}	—	August 23, 2007	Kitt Peak	Spacewatch	EOS	1.5 km	MPC · JPL
701675	2005 GV_{236}	—	May 12, 2011	Mount Lemmon	Mount Lemmon Survey	VER	2.8 km	MPC · JPL
701676	2005 GZ_{238}	—	April 11, 2005	Mount Lemmon	Mount Lemmon Survey	URS	2.3 km	MPC · JPL
701677	2005 GQ_{241}	—	April 12, 2005	Kitt Peak	Spacewatch	·	1.4 km	MPC · JPL
701678	2005 HQ_{9}	—	April 30, 2005	Kitt Peak	Spacewatch	·	1.2 km	MPC · JPL
701679	2005 HA_{11}	—	December 2, 2012	Mount Lemmon	Mount Lemmon Survey	·	1.5 km	MPC · JPL
701680	2005 HC_{11}	—	April 16, 2005	Kitt Peak	Spacewatch	·	1.2 km	MPC · JPL
701681	2005 HG_{13}	—	April 16, 2005	Kitt Peak	Spacewatch	THM	2.0 km	MPC · JPL
701682	2005 JN_{6}	—	April 5, 2005	Mount Lemmon	Mount Lemmon Survey	EOS	1.4 km	MPC · JPL
701683	2005 JR_{7}	—	April 5, 2005	Mount Lemmon	Mount Lemmon Survey	EOS	1.9 km	MPC · JPL
701684	2005 JP_{10}	—	July 5, 2014	Haleakala	Pan-STARRS 1	·	810 m	MPC · JPL
701685	2005 JS_{15}	—	April 11, 2005	Mount Lemmon	Mount Lemmon Survey	NYS	1.0 km	MPC · JPL
701686	2005 JD_{19}	—	May 4, 2005	Mount Lemmon	Mount Lemmon Survey	·	2.3 km	MPC · JPL
701687	2005 JM_{38}	—	April 1, 2005	Kitt Peak	Spacewatch	·	870 m	MPC · JPL
701688	2005 JQ_{39}	—	May 7, 2005	Mount Lemmon	Mount Lemmon Survey	·	2.2 km	MPC · JPL
701689	2005 JF_{45}	—	May 2, 2005	Kitt Peak	D. E. Trilling, A. S. Rivkin	H	440 m	MPC · JPL
701690	2005 JQ_{45}	—	May 3, 2005	Kitt Peak	D. E. Trilling, A. S. Rivkin	H	400 m	MPC · JPL
701691	2005 JK_{46}	—	May 3, 2005	Kitt Peak	Spacewatch	·	1.3 km	MPC · JPL
701692	2005 JC_{53}	—	May 4, 2005	Mount Lemmon	Mount Lemmon Survey	·	1.4 km	MPC · JPL
701693	2005 JL_{53}	—	May 4, 2005	Mount Lemmon	Mount Lemmon Survey	·	1.5 km	MPC · JPL
701694	2005 JY_{57}	—	May 7, 2005	Kitt Peak	Spacewatch	·	2.9 km	MPC · JPL
701695	2005 JG_{60}	—	May 8, 2005	Kitt Peak	Spacewatch	·	1.3 km	MPC · JPL
701696	2005 JK_{63}	—	May 4, 2005	Kitt Peak	D. E. Trilling, A. S. Rivkin	H	570 m	MPC · JPL
701697	2005 JB_{64}	—	May 4, 2005	Kitt Peak	D. E. Trilling, A. S. Rivkin	H	480 m	MPC · JPL
701698	2005 JU_{64}	—	May 4, 2005	Kitt Peak	Spacewatch	NYS	660 m	MPC · JPL
701699	2005 JC_{71}	—	May 7, 2005	Mount Lemmon	Mount Lemmon Survey	AEO	1.0 km	MPC · JPL
701700	2005 JS_{73}	—	May 8, 2005	Kitt Peak	Spacewatch	·	2.4 km	MPC · JPL

== 701701–701800 ==
back to top

Designation			Discovery			Properties		Ref
Permanent	Provisional	Named after	Date	Site	Discoverer(s)	Category	Diam.	Ref
701701	2005 JN_{77}	—	May 10, 2005	Kitt Peak	Spacewatch	·	450 m	MPC · JPL
701702	2005 JP_{85}	—	May 8, 2005	Mount Lemmon	Mount Lemmon Survey	·	1.2 km	MPC · JPL
701703	2005 JU_{89}	—	May 11, 2005	Mount Lemmon	Mount Lemmon Survey	·	750 m	MPC · JPL
701704	2005 JD_{101}	—	May 9, 2005	Mount Lemmon	Mount Lemmon Survey	EUN	1.1 km	MPC · JPL
701705	2005 JB_{102}	—	May 9, 2005	Kitt Peak	Spacewatch	EOS	1.9 km	MPC · JPL
701706	2005 JH_{105}	—	May 11, 2005	Mount Lemmon	Mount Lemmon Survey	·	1.4 km	MPC · JPL
701707	2005 JU_{110}	—	May 8, 2005	Kitt Peak	Spacewatch	AGN	1.1 km	MPC · JPL
701708	2005 JV_{110}	—	May 8, 2005	Kitt Peak	Spacewatch	·	2.5 km	MPC · JPL
701709	2005 JF_{111}	—	May 8, 2005	Kitt Peak	Spacewatch	·	2.9 km	MPC · JPL
701710	2005 JP_{114}	—	April 30, 2005	Kitt Peak	Spacewatch	VER	2.8 km	MPC · JPL
701711	2005 JV_{116}	—	May 10, 2005	Mount Lemmon	Mount Lemmon Survey	·	710 m	MPC · JPL
701712	2005 JZ_{119}	—	May 10, 2005	Mount Lemmon	Mount Lemmon Survey	NEM	1.9 km	MPC · JPL
701713	2005 JC_{120}	—	May 10, 2005	Mount Lemmon	Mount Lemmon Survey	·	1.6 km	MPC · JPL
701714	2005 JA_{138}	—	May 13, 2005	Kitt Peak	Spacewatch	·	1.9 km	MPC · JPL
701715	2005 JA_{146}	—	May 4, 2005	Palomar	NEAT	·	2.2 km	MPC · JPL
701716	2005 JV_{152}	—	May 4, 2005	Kitt Peak	Spacewatch	NYS	810 m	MPC · JPL
701717	2005 JA_{155}	—	April 17, 2005	Kitt Peak	Spacewatch	·	1.5 km	MPC · JPL
701718	2005 JD_{159}	—	May 7, 2005	Kitt Peak	Spacewatch	·	1.4 km	MPC · JPL
701719	2005 JM_{172}	—	May 10, 2005	Cerro Tololo	Deep Ecliptic Survey	·	2.1 km	MPC · JPL
701720	2005 JP_{178}	—	May 1, 2005	Palomar	NEAT	·	1.8 km	MPC · JPL
701721	2005 JG_{181}	—	May 8, 2005	Mount Lemmon	Mount Lemmon Survey	MAS	620 m	MPC · JPL
701722	2005 JX_{186}	—	August 25, 2012	Kitt Peak	Spacewatch	·	2.5 km	MPC · JPL
701723	2005 JT_{188}	—	July 22, 2017	ESA OGS	ESA OGS	(58892)	2.4 km	MPC · JPL
701724	2005 JQ_{189}	—	May 14, 2005	Kitt Peak	Spacewatch	·	1.7 km	MPC · JPL
701725	2005 JW_{190}	—	May 10, 2005	Mount Lemmon	Mount Lemmon Survey	NYS	1.0 km	MPC · JPL
701726	2005 JJ_{191}	—	March 19, 2017	Mount Lemmon	Mount Lemmon Survey	·	840 m	MPC · JPL
701727	2005 JT_{191}	—	November 2, 2013	Mount Lemmon	Mount Lemmon Survey	·	2.5 km	MPC · JPL
701728	2005 JV_{191}	—	May 11, 2005	Kitt Peak	Spacewatch	·	3.5 km	MPC · JPL
701729	2005 JX_{192}	—	March 8, 2014	Nogales	M. Schwartz, P. R. Holvorcem	·	1.7 km	MPC · JPL
701730	2005 JZ_{192}	—	July 7, 2016	Haleakala	Pan-STARRS 1	·	600 m	MPC · JPL
701731	2005 JB_{193}	—	November 18, 2016	Mount Lemmon	Mount Lemmon Survey	·	1.7 km	MPC · JPL
701732	2005 JX_{193}	—	October 3, 2013	Kitt Peak	Spacewatch	·	2.9 km	MPC · JPL
701733	2005 JA_{195}	—	September 18, 2014	Haleakala	Pan-STARRS 1	·	960 m	MPC · JPL
701734	2005 KH_{1}	—	May 16, 2005	Kitt Peak	Spacewatch	·	880 m	MPC · JPL
701735	2005 KZ_{15}	—	May 16, 2005	Mount Lemmon	Mount Lemmon Survey	·	1.2 km	MPC · JPL
701736	2005 KG_{16}	—	May 19, 2005	Mount Lemmon	Mount Lemmon Survey	·	3.2 km	MPC · JPL
701737	2005 LM_{12}	—	May 21, 2005	Palomar	NEAT	·	1.3 km	MPC · JPL
701738	2005 LM_{17}	—	June 6, 2005	Kitt Peak	Spacewatch	·	1.7 km	MPC · JPL
701739	2005 LT_{19}	—	June 8, 2005	Kitt Peak	Spacewatch	·	1.3 km	MPC · JPL
701740	2005 LV_{21}	—	May 13, 2005	Kitt Peak	Spacewatch	MAR	910 m	MPC · JPL
701741	2005 LA_{31}	—	June 9, 2005	Bergisch Gladbach	W. Bickel	RAF	830 m	MPC · JPL
701742	2005 LQ_{46}	—	May 15, 2005	Mount Lemmon	Mount Lemmon Survey	·	1.1 km	MPC · JPL
701743	2005 LH_{49}	—	June 10, 2005	Kitt Peak	Spacewatch	·	2.2 km	MPC · JPL
701744	2005 LG_{52}	—	June 14, 2005	Mount Lemmon	Mount Lemmon Survey	H	480 m	MPC · JPL
701745	2005 LR_{54}	—	October 15, 2012	Mount Lemmon	Mount Lemmon Survey	·	2.5 km	MPC · JPL
701746	2005 LE_{55}	—	October 23, 2011	Haleakala	Pan-STARRS 1	·	1.5 km	MPC · JPL
701747	2005 LJ_{55}	—	March 8, 2014	Mount Lemmon	Mount Lemmon Survey	·	1.8 km	MPC · JPL
701748	2005 LS_{55}	—	June 8, 2005	Kitt Peak	Spacewatch	·	2.9 km	MPC · JPL
701749	2005 LE_{56}	—	February 22, 2014	Haleakala	Pan-STARRS 1	·	1.9 km	MPC · JPL
701750	2005 LQ_{57}	—	December 15, 2007	Catalina	CSS	HNS	1.2 km	MPC · JPL
701751	2005 LU_{57}	—	August 12, 2015	Haleakala	Pan-STARRS 1	·	1.7 km	MPC · JPL
701752	2005 LB_{59}	—	June 15, 2005	Mount Lemmon	Mount Lemmon Survey	NYS	1.1 km	MPC · JPL
701753	2005 MJ_{55}	—	June 21, 2014	Haleakala	Pan-STARRS 1	·	1.6 km	MPC · JPL
701754	2005 NO_{2}	—	July 2, 2005	Kitt Peak	Spacewatch	NYS	920 m	MPC · JPL
701755	2005 NG_{3}	—	July 1, 2005	Kitt Peak	Spacewatch	EUN	980 m	MPC · JPL
701756	2005 NW_{27}	—	July 8, 2005	Kitt Peak	Spacewatch	·	740 m	MPC · JPL
701757	2005 NG_{74}	—	July 9, 2005	Kitt Peak	Spacewatch	·	810 m	MPC · JPL
701758	2005 NF_{75}	—	July 10, 2005	Kitt Peak	Spacewatch	·	1.7 km	MPC · JPL
701759	2005 NP_{86}	—	September 26, 2009	Kitt Peak	Spacewatch	·	910 m	MPC · JPL
701760	2005 NC_{93}	—	July 5, 2005	Mount Lemmon	Mount Lemmon Survey	·	1.9 km	MPC · JPL
701761	2005 NW_{97}	—	July 9, 2005	Kitt Peak	Spacewatch	·	540 m	MPC · JPL
701762	2005 NS_{100}	—	July 9, 2005	Kitt Peak	Spacewatch	·	560 m	MPC · JPL
701763	2005 NC_{104}	—	July 7, 2005	Mauna Kea	Veillet, C.	·	1.6 km	MPC · JPL
701764	2005 NT_{106}	—	July 7, 2005	Mauna Kea	Veillet, C.	·	1.9 km	MPC · JPL
701765	2005 NH_{110}	—	July 7, 2005	Mauna Kea	Veillet, C.	·	1.3 km	MPC · JPL
701766	2005 NM_{113}	—	July 7, 2005	Mauna Kea	Veillet, C.	·	2.2 km	MPC · JPL
701767	2005 NV_{127}	—	September 4, 2014	Haleakala	Pan-STARRS 1	·	1.6 km	MPC · JPL
701768	2005 NA_{128}	—	December 20, 2014	Haleakala	Pan-STARRS 1	·	3.0 km	MPC · JPL
701769	2005 NW_{128}	—	March 7, 2008	Catalina	CSS	PHO	800 m	MPC · JPL
701770	2005 NA_{129}	—	March 3, 2009	Kitt Peak	Spacewatch	·	2.8 km	MPC · JPL
701771	2005 NB_{130}	—	July 10, 2005	Kitt Peak	Spacewatch	·	610 m	MPC · JPL
701772	2005 NC_{131}	—	January 28, 2017	Haleakala	Pan-STARRS 1	·	500 m	MPC · JPL
701773	2005 NM_{132}	—	December 5, 2007	Mount Lemmon	Mount Lemmon Survey	THM	1.8 km	MPC · JPL
701774	2005 NE_{134}	—	February 2, 2013	Mount Lemmon	Mount Lemmon Survey	·	1.5 km	MPC · JPL
701775	2005 OQ_{12}	—	July 29, 2005	Palomar	NEAT	·	970 m	MPC · JPL
701776	2005 OH_{23}	—	October 17, 1998	Kitt Peak	Spacewatch	·	930 m	MPC · JPL
701777	2005 OM_{32}	—	July 30, 2005	Palomar	NEAT	·	1.2 km	MPC · JPL
701778	2005 OW_{34}	—	July 27, 2005	Palomar	NEAT	·	1.5 km	MPC · JPL
701779	2005 PF_{16}	—	July 28, 2005	Palomar	NEAT	(18466)	2.1 km	MPC · JPL
701780	2005 PR_{18}	—	July 30, 2005	Palomar	NEAT	·	1.8 km	MPC · JPL
701781 Dougjohnstone	2005 PX_{24}	Dougjohnstone	August 5, 2005	Mauna Kea	P. A. Wiegert, D. D. Balam	·	1.3 km	MPC · JPL
701782	2005 PP_{29}	—	March 6, 2011	Mount Lemmon	Mount Lemmon Survey	V	600 m	MPC · JPL
701783	2005 PU_{29}	—	October 22, 2006	Mount Lemmon	Mount Lemmon Survey	·	1.7 km	MPC · JPL
701784	2005 PK_{30}	—	December 28, 2013	Kitt Peak	Spacewatch	·	2.8 km	MPC · JPL
701785	2005 QU_{2}	—	August 24, 2005	Palomar	NEAT	H	510 m	MPC · JPL
701786	2005 QQ_{9}	—	August 6, 2005	Palomar	NEAT	·	950 m	MPC · JPL
701787	2005 QU_{34}	—	August 25, 2005	Palomar	NEAT	·	1.8 km	MPC · JPL
701788	2005 QT_{45}	—	August 28, 2005	Kitt Peak	Spacewatch	AGN	990 m	MPC · JPL
701789	2005 QR_{48}	—	August 28, 2005	Kitt Peak	Spacewatch	·	930 m	MPC · JPL
701790	2005 QL_{52}	—	August 27, 2005	Kitt Peak	Spacewatch	·	770 m	MPC · JPL
701791	2005 QA_{58}	—	August 25, 2005	Palomar	NEAT	·	1.1 km	MPC · JPL
701792	2005 QB_{65}	—	August 26, 2005	Palomar	NEAT	·	1.4 km	MPC · JPL
701793	2005 QA_{72}	—	July 6, 2005	Kitt Peak	Spacewatch	NYS	1.0 km	MPC · JPL
701794	2005 QK_{75}	—	August 29, 2005	Saint-Véran	St. Veran	·	1.8 km	MPC · JPL
701795	2005 QT_{77}	—	August 25, 2005	Palomar	NEAT	·	1.7 km	MPC · JPL
701796	2005 QN_{79}	—	August 26, 2005	Palomar	NEAT	V	630 m	MPC · JPL
701797	2005 QM_{88}	—	August 29, 2005	St. Véran	C. Demeautis, Matter, D.	·	560 m	MPC · JPL
701798	2005 QY_{96}	—	August 31, 2005	Kitt Peak	Spacewatch	MAS	590 m	MPC · JPL
701799	2005 QW_{97}	—	August 30, 2005	Anderson Mesa	LONEOS	·	1.8 km	MPC · JPL
701800	2005 QC_{100}	—	July 31, 2005	Palomar	NEAT	·	1.6 km	MPC · JPL

== 701801–701900 ==
back to top

Designation			Discovery			Properties		Ref
Permanent	Provisional	Named after	Date	Site	Discoverer(s)	Category	Diam.	Ref
701801	2005 QA_{101}	—	August 30, 2005	Kitt Peak	Spacewatch	·	1.5 km	MPC · JPL
701802	2005 QW_{108}	—	August 31, 2005	Kitt Peak	Spacewatch	AGN	1.1 km	MPC · JPL
701803	2005 QQ_{112}	—	September 1, 2005	Kitt Peak	Spacewatch	EUN	860 m	MPC · JPL
701804	2005 QZ_{121}	—	August 28, 2005	Kitt Peak	Spacewatch	·	1.9 km	MPC · JPL
701805	2005 QE_{123}	—	August 28, 2005	Kitt Peak	Spacewatch	MAR	1.0 km	MPC · JPL
701806	2005 QV_{127}	—	August 28, 2005	Kitt Peak	Spacewatch	MAS	550 m	MPC · JPL
701807	2005 QK_{168}	—	August 30, 2005	Palomar	NEAT	·	1.1 km	MPC · JPL
701808	2005 QF_{170}	—	August 30, 2005	Palomar	NEAT	·	1.1 km	MPC · JPL
701809	2005 QZ_{176}	—	August 27, 2005	Kitt Peak	Spacewatch	·	1.1 km	MPC · JPL
701810	2005 QL_{189}	—	August 26, 2005	Palomar	NEAT	·	1.5 km	MPC · JPL
701811	2005 QT_{190}	—	July 30, 2005	Palomar	NEAT	·	1.1 km	MPC · JPL
701812	2005 QG_{191}	—	July 29, 2005	Palomar	NEAT	·	1.1 km	MPC · JPL
701813	2005 QT_{191}	—	August 30, 2005	Kitt Peak	Spacewatch	·	1.8 km	MPC · JPL
701814	2005 QU_{191}	—	August 28, 2005	Kitt Peak	Spacewatch	·	860 m	MPC · JPL
701815	2005 QW_{192}	—	January 20, 2015	Haleakala	Pan-STARRS 1	·	960 m	MPC · JPL
701816	2005 QK_{193}	—	July 31, 2009	Kitt Peak	Spacewatch	·	1.3 km	MPC · JPL
701817	2005 QL_{193}	—	August 29, 2005	Kitt Peak	Spacewatch	(5)	950 m	MPC · JPL
701818	2005 QB_{194}	—	August 29, 2005	Kitt Peak	Spacewatch	·	1.4 km	MPC · JPL
701819	2005 QZ_{194}	—	October 14, 2013	Kitt Peak	Spacewatch	·	1 km	MPC · JPL
701820	2005 QW_{197}	—	August 29, 2005	Kitt Peak	Spacewatch	·	1.7 km	MPC · JPL
701821	2005 QC_{198}	—	April 17, 2009	Kitt Peak	Spacewatch	·	1.7 km	MPC · JPL
701822	2005 QN_{198}	—	August 29, 2005	Kitt Peak	Spacewatch	MAS	670 m	MPC · JPL
701823	2005 QF_{199}	—	July 11, 2005	Catalina	CSS	·	1.1 km	MPC · JPL
701824	2005 QY_{199}	—	August 6, 2016	Haleakala	Pan-STARRS 1	H	370 m	MPC · JPL
701825	2005 QZ_{201}	—	August 28, 2016	Mount Lemmon	Mount Lemmon Survey	·	840 m	MPC · JPL
701826	2005 QE_{202}	—	May 23, 2014	Haleakala	Pan-STARRS 1	·	1.6 km	MPC · JPL
701827	2005 QF_{202}	—	February 27, 2012	Haleakala	Pan-STARRS 1	·	850 m	MPC · JPL
701828	2005 QU_{205}	—	August 28, 2005	Kitt Peak	Spacewatch	·	1.1 km	MPC · JPL
701829	2005 QO_{206}	—	October 13, 2010	Mount Lemmon	Mount Lemmon Survey	·	1.3 km	MPC · JPL
701830	2005 QP_{206}	—	January 28, 2014	Mount Lemmon	Mount Lemmon Survey	·	2.3 km	MPC · JPL
701831	2005 QE_{208}	—	March 11, 2008	Kitt Peak	Spacewatch	·	1.3 km	MPC · JPL
701832	2005 QZ_{208}	—	August 30, 2005	Kitt Peak	Spacewatch	EOS	1.3 km	MPC · JPL
701833	2005 QR_{209}	—	August 31, 2005	Kitt Peak	Spacewatch	·	1.2 km	MPC · JPL
701834	2005 QF_{210}	—	September 14, 2020	Haleakala	Pan-STARRS 1	·	1.2 km	MPC · JPL
701835	2005 RX_{12}	—	March 20, 1999	Apache Point	SDSS Collaboration	·	1.6 km	MPC · JPL
701836	2005 RN_{17}	—	September 1, 2005	Kitt Peak	Spacewatch	·	1.2 km	MPC · JPL
701837	2005 RP_{35}	—	September 3, 2005	Mauna Kea	Veillet, C.	EOS	1.3 km	MPC · JPL
701838	2005 RR_{46}	—	October 1, 2005	Apache Point	SDSS Collaboration	·	1.7 km	MPC · JPL
701839	2005 RV_{46}	—	October 3, 2005	Apache Point	SDSS Collaboration	·	1.5 km	MPC · JPL
701840	2005 RP_{56}	—	March 10, 2008	Kitt Peak	Spacewatch	·	1.7 km	MPC · JPL
701841	2005 RY_{56}	—	September 13, 2005	Kitt Peak	Spacewatch	·	950 m	MPC · JPL
701842	2005 RZ_{56}	—	September 17, 2010	Mount Lemmon	Mount Lemmon Survey	·	1.5 km	MPC · JPL
701843	2005 RK_{57}	—	June 3, 2011	Mount Lemmon	Mount Lemmon Survey	·	600 m	MPC · JPL
701844	2005 RF_{58}	—	September 13, 2005	Kitt Peak	Spacewatch	·	500 m	MPC · JPL
701845	2005 RT_{58}	—	July 4, 2016	Haleakala	Pan-STARRS 1	·	1.1 km	MPC · JPL
701846	2005 RN_{63}	—	September 1, 2005	Kitt Peak	Spacewatch	·	1.0 km	MPC · JPL
701847	2005 SX_{9}	—	September 23, 2005	Junk Bond	D. Healy	·	2.0 km	MPC · JPL
701848	2005 SD_{18}	—	September 26, 2005	Kitt Peak	Spacewatch	·	1.1 km	MPC · JPL
701849	2005 SR_{38}	—	September 24, 2005	Kitt Peak	Spacewatch	THM	2.4 km	MPC · JPL
701850	2005 SD_{57}	—	September 23, 2005	Catalina	CSS	·	710 m	MPC · JPL
701851	2005 SE_{58}	—	September 26, 2005	Kitt Peak	Spacewatch	BRA	1.1 km	MPC · JPL
701852	2005 SQ_{80}	—	March 17, 2004	Kitt Peak	Spacewatch	·	930 m	MPC · JPL
701853	2005 ST_{95}	—	September 25, 2005	Kitt Peak	Spacewatch	·	2.0 km	MPC · JPL
701854	2005 SQ_{107}	—	August 29, 2005	Palomar	NEAT	·	2.2 km	MPC · JPL
701855	2005 SR_{136}	—	September 13, 2005	Kitt Peak	Spacewatch	KOR	1.1 km	MPC · JPL
701856	2005 SZ_{142}	—	September 25, 2005	Kitt Peak	Spacewatch	·	1.3 km	MPC · JPL
701857	2005 SX_{144}	—	September 25, 2005	Kitt Peak	Spacewatch	·	850 m	MPC · JPL
701858	2005 SY_{172}	—	September 29, 2005	Kitt Peak	Spacewatch	·	1.0 km	MPC · JPL
701859	2005 SF_{180}	—	September 29, 2005	Mount Lemmon	Mount Lemmon Survey	·	1.3 km	MPC · JPL
701860	2005 SH_{185}	—	September 29, 2005	Kitt Peak	Spacewatch	KOR	1.0 km	MPC · JPL
701861	2005 SG_{203}	—	September 30, 2005	Mount Lemmon	Mount Lemmon Survey	THM	2.2 km	MPC · JPL
701862	2005 SG_{205}	—	August 29, 2005	Palomar	NEAT	GEF	1.4 km	MPC · JPL
701863	2005 SN_{209}	—	August 29, 2005	Palomar	NEAT	DOR	2.3 km	MPC · JPL
701864	2005 SM_{234}	—	September 29, 2005	Mount Lemmon	Mount Lemmon Survey	·	1.5 km	MPC · JPL
701865	2005 SD_{241}	—	September 30, 2005	Kitt Peak	Spacewatch	·	500 m	MPC · JPL
701866	2005 SM_{256}	—	August 26, 2005	Palomar	NEAT	V	690 m	MPC · JPL
701867	2005 SM_{258}	—	July 29, 2005	Palomar	NEAT	·	620 m	MPC · JPL
701868	2005 SB_{259}	—	September 24, 2005	Kitt Peak	Spacewatch	·	1.6 km	MPC · JPL
701869	2005 SA_{274}	—	September 29, 2005	Kitt Peak	Spacewatch	·	1.6 km	MPC · JPL
701870	2005 SJ_{282}	—	October 25, 2005	Apache Point	SDSS Collaboration	·	1.7 km	MPC · JPL
701871	2005 SW_{283}	—	September 23, 2005	Kitt Peak	Spacewatch	·	1.5 km	MPC · JPL
701872	2005 SL_{286}	—	October 11, 2005	Apache Point	SDSS Collaboration	·	1.7 km	MPC · JPL
701873	2005 SA_{287}	—	October 1, 2005	Apache Point	SDSS Collaboration	·	2.1 km	MPC · JPL
701874	2005 SC_{289}	—	October 1, 2005	Apache Point	SDSS Collaboration	·	920 m	MPC · JPL
701875	2005 SD_{294}	—	September 30, 2005	Mauna Kea	A. Boattini	·	1.4 km	MPC · JPL
701876	2005 SH_{295}	—	September 29, 2005	Kitt Peak	Spacewatch	·	790 m	MPC · JPL
701877	2005 SQ_{295}	—	October 26, 2011	Haleakala	Pan-STARRS 1	·	1.8 km	MPC · JPL
701878	2005 SN_{296}	—	February 23, 2015	Haleakala	Pan-STARRS 1	·	1.0 km	MPC · JPL
701879	2005 SG_{298}	—	February 26, 2011	Mount Lemmon	Mount Lemmon Survey	·	940 m	MPC · JPL
701880	2005 SG_{299}	—	November 23, 2015	Mount Lemmon	Mount Lemmon Survey	·	450 m	MPC · JPL
701881	2005 SB_{300}	—	September 29, 2005	Kitt Peak	Spacewatch	·	1.5 km	MPC · JPL
701882	2005 SN_{301}	—	September 30, 2005	Mount Lemmon	Mount Lemmon Survey	·	2.2 km	MPC · JPL
701883	2005 SU_{301}	—	September 30, 2005	Mauna Kea	A. Boattini	·	2.3 km	MPC · JPL
701884	2005 SD_{302}	—	September 30, 2005	Mount Lemmon	Mount Lemmon Survey	·	1.8 km	MPC · JPL
701885	2005 TV_{12}	—	September 29, 2005	Anderson Mesa	LONEOS	·	510 m	MPC · JPL
701886	2005 TD_{16}	—	July 30, 2005	Palomar	NEAT	·	1.3 km	MPC · JPL
701887	2005 TJ_{34}	—	October 1, 2005	Kitt Peak	Spacewatch	·	630 m	MPC · JPL
701888	2005 TQ_{42}	—	October 3, 2005	Palomar	NEAT	·	2.8 km	MPC · JPL
701889	2005 TZ_{59}	—	October 2, 2005	Mount Lemmon	Mount Lemmon Survey	·	1.4 km	MPC · JPL
701890	2005 TM_{67}	—	October 5, 2005	Mount Lemmon	Mount Lemmon Survey	·	1.3 km	MPC · JPL
701891	2005 TL_{84}	—	October 3, 2005	Kitt Peak	Spacewatch	·	1.9 km	MPC · JPL
701892	2005 TQ_{92}	—	October 6, 2005	Kitt Peak	Spacewatch	·	1.5 km	MPC · JPL
701893	2005 TA_{93}	—	September 26, 2005	Kitt Peak	Spacewatch	·	2.1 km	MPC · JPL
701894	2005 TC_{117}	—	October 7, 2005	Kitt Peak	Spacewatch	NYS	1.0 km	MPC · JPL
701895	2005 TD_{120}	—	October 7, 2005	Kitt Peak	Spacewatch	·	2.0 km	MPC · JPL
701896	2005 TF_{137}	—	October 6, 2005	Kitt Peak	Spacewatch	NYS	1.0 km	MPC · JPL
701897	2005 TE_{145}	—	September 29, 2005	Kitt Peak	Spacewatch	WIT	840 m	MPC · JPL
701898	2005 TV_{145}	—	October 8, 2005	Kitt Peak	Spacewatch	·	1.4 km	MPC · JPL
701899	2005 TR_{156}	—	October 3, 2005	Kitt Peak	Spacewatch	·	520 m	MPC · JPL
701900	2005 TF_{160}	—	October 9, 2005	Kitt Peak	Spacewatch	·	1.4 km	MPC · JPL

== 701901–702000 ==
back to top

Designation			Discovery			Properties		Ref
Permanent	Provisional	Named after	Date	Site	Discoverer(s)	Category	Diam.	Ref
701901	2005 TS_{160}	—	October 9, 2005	Kitt Peak	Spacewatch	·	2.0 km	MPC · JPL
701902	2005 TP_{161}	—	October 9, 2005	Kitt Peak	Spacewatch	BRA	1.2 km	MPC · JPL
701903	2005 TU_{166}	—	October 9, 2005	Kitt Peak	Spacewatch	·	1.5 km	MPC · JPL
701904	2005 TQ_{169}	—	October 10, 2005	Kitt Peak	Spacewatch	·	1.9 km	MPC · JPL
701905	2005 TL_{170}	—	October 3, 2005	Kitt Peak	Spacewatch	·	3.0 km	MPC · JPL
701906	2005 TM_{177}	—	September 13, 2005	Kitt Peak	Spacewatch	·	830 m	MPC · JPL
701907	2005 TA_{185}	—	October 1, 2005	Mount Lemmon	Mount Lemmon Survey	MAS	620 m	MPC · JPL
701908	2005 TV_{188}	—	October 13, 2005	Kitt Peak	Spacewatch	·	1.9 km	MPC · JPL
701909	2005 TT_{193}	—	October 1, 2005	Kitt Peak	Spacewatch	·	1.3 km	MPC · JPL
701910	2005 TO_{195}	—	October 1, 2005	Mount Lemmon	Mount Lemmon Survey	·	1.1 km	MPC · JPL
701911	2005 TB_{199}	—	October 1, 2005	Mount Lemmon	Mount Lemmon Survey	·	1.5 km	MPC · JPL
701912	2005 TD_{199}	—	October 1, 2005	Mount Lemmon	Mount Lemmon Survey	·	530 m	MPC · JPL
701913	2005 TD_{200}	—	October 10, 2005	Kitt Peak	Spacewatch	MAS	620 m	MPC · JPL
701914	2005 TO_{200}	—	October 3, 2014	Mount Lemmon	Mount Lemmon Survey	·	1.7 km	MPC · JPL
701915	2005 TZ_{200}	—	January 8, 2011	Mount Lemmon	Mount Lemmon Survey	·	1.3 km	MPC · JPL
701916	2005 TC_{201}	—	October 9, 2005	Kitt Peak	Spacewatch	·	2.2 km	MPC · JPL
701917	2005 TB_{202}	—	October 9, 2010	Mount Lemmon	Mount Lemmon Survey	·	1.5 km	MPC · JPL
701918	2005 TG_{202}	—	October 1, 2005	Kitt Peak	Spacewatch	·	2.0 km	MPC · JPL
701919	2005 TS_{202}	—	July 29, 2008	Kitt Peak	Spacewatch	·	500 m	MPC · JPL
701920	2005 TM_{207}	—	October 17, 2012	Mount Lemmon	Mount Lemmon Survey	·	3.2 km	MPC · JPL
701921	2005 TZ_{210}	—	October 11, 2005	Kitt Peak	Spacewatch	·	1.4 km	MPC · JPL
701922	2005 TD_{211}	—	May 8, 2013	Haleakala	Pan-STARRS 1	HOF	1.7 km	MPC · JPL
701923	2005 TZ_{211}	—	October 12, 2005	Kitt Peak	Spacewatch	MAS	710 m	MPC · JPL
701924	2005 TM_{212}	—	January 4, 2016	Haleakala	Pan-STARRS 1	AST	1.3 km	MPC · JPL
701925	2005 TF_{214}	—	October 9, 2005	Kitt Peak	Spacewatch	·	1.8 km	MPC · JPL
701926	2005 TM_{215}	—	October 1, 2005	Mount Lemmon	Mount Lemmon Survey	·	1.7 km	MPC · JPL
701927	2005 TQ_{217}	—	October 1, 2005	Kitt Peak	Spacewatch	·	1.5 km	MPC · JPL
701928	2005 TC_{218}	—	October 1, 2005	Mount Lemmon	Mount Lemmon Survey	KOR	990 m	MPC · JPL
701929	2005 UR_{34}	—	October 24, 2005	Kitt Peak	Spacewatch	PHO	800 m	MPC · JPL
701930	2005 UY_{84}	—	April 13, 2004	Kitt Peak	Spacewatch	·	1.4 km	MPC · JPL
701931	2005 UD_{102}	—	October 22, 2005	Kitt Peak	Spacewatch	·	1.3 km	MPC · JPL
701932	2005 UT_{103}	—	October 22, 2005	Kitt Peak	Spacewatch	·	1.7 km	MPC · JPL
701933	2005 UB_{113}	—	October 22, 2005	Kitt Peak	Spacewatch	·	1.1 km	MPC · JPL
701934	2005 UL_{115}	—	October 23, 2005	Kitt Peak	Spacewatch	·	1.4 km	MPC · JPL
701935	2005 UC_{116}	—	October 23, 2005	Catalina	CSS	·	1.1 km	MPC · JPL
701936	2005 UK_{121}	—	October 24, 2005	Kitt Peak	Spacewatch	·	1.2 km	MPC · JPL
701937	2005 UA_{123}	—	October 24, 2005	Kitt Peak	Spacewatch	·	1.4 km	MPC · JPL
701938	2005 UR_{123}	—	October 24, 2005	Kitt Peak	Spacewatch	NYS	950 m	MPC · JPL
701939	2005 UO_{129}	—	October 24, 2005	Kitt Peak	Spacewatch	BRA	1.2 km	MPC · JPL
701940	2005 UE_{133}	—	October 25, 2005	Kitt Peak	Spacewatch	MAS	660 m	MPC · JPL
701941	2005 UU_{137}	—	October 1, 2005	Mount Lemmon	Mount Lemmon Survey	·	1.3 km	MPC · JPL
701942	2005 UL_{146}	—	September 30, 2005	Mount Lemmon	Mount Lemmon Survey	·	1.6 km	MPC · JPL
701943	2005 UY_{146}	—	February 13, 2002	Apache Point	SDSS Collaboration	DOR	1.9 km	MPC · JPL
701944	2005 UB_{148}	—	October 26, 2005	Kitt Peak	Spacewatch	·	1.1 km	MPC · JPL
701945	2005 UY_{163}	—	October 24, 2005	Kitt Peak	Spacewatch	·	1.5 km	MPC · JPL
701946	2005 UN_{173}	—	October 24, 2005	Kitt Peak	Spacewatch	KOR	1.1 km	MPC · JPL
701947	2005 UN_{191}	—	October 27, 2005	Mount Lemmon	Mount Lemmon Survey	·	3.4 km	MPC · JPL
701948	2005 UL_{208}	—	October 27, 2005	Kitt Peak	Spacewatch	·	1.7 km	MPC · JPL
701949	2005 UB_{221}	—	August 25, 2000	Cerro Tololo	Deep Ecliptic Survey	·	1.9 km	MPC · JPL
701950	2005 US_{221}	—	October 25, 2005	Kitt Peak	Spacewatch	ADE	1.9 km	MPC · JPL
701951	2005 UG_{231}	—	October 25, 2005	Mount Lemmon	Mount Lemmon Survey	TEL	1.2 km	MPC · JPL
701952	2005 UA_{232}	—	October 25, 2005	Mount Lemmon	Mount Lemmon Survey	·	1.5 km	MPC · JPL
701953	2005 UC_{232}	—	October 25, 2005	Mount Lemmon	Mount Lemmon Survey	EOS	1.4 km	MPC · JPL
701954	2005 UW_{232}	—	October 25, 2005	Kitt Peak	Spacewatch	HOF	1.8 km	MPC · JPL
701955	2005 US_{245}	—	October 26, 2005	Kitt Peak	Spacewatch	·	1.1 km	MPC · JPL
701956	2005 UM_{249}	—	October 28, 2005	Mount Lemmon	Mount Lemmon Survey	KOR	1.2 km	MPC · JPL
701957	2005 UQ_{258}	—	October 25, 2005	Kitt Peak	Spacewatch	·	1.7 km	MPC · JPL
701958	2005 UM_{270}	—	October 4, 2005	Mount Lemmon	Mount Lemmon Survey	KOR	1.1 km	MPC · JPL
701959	2005 UH_{285}	—	September 25, 2005	Kitt Peak	Spacewatch	·	2.1 km	MPC · JPL
701960	2005 UE_{294}	—	October 26, 2005	Kitt Peak	Spacewatch	AGN	1.0 km	MPC · JPL
701961	2005 UR_{294}	—	October 26, 2005	Kitt Peak	Spacewatch	(5)	1.0 km	MPC · JPL
701962	2005 UF_{295}	—	October 26, 2005	Kitt Peak	Spacewatch	·	1.7 km	MPC · JPL
701963	2005 UR_{295}	—	October 26, 2005	Kitt Peak	Spacewatch	·	1.3 km	MPC · JPL
701964	2005 UX_{300}	—	October 26, 2005	Kitt Peak	Spacewatch	EOS	1.4 km	MPC · JPL
701965	2005 UT_{320}	—	October 27, 2005	Kitt Peak	Spacewatch	·	1.3 km	MPC · JPL
701966	2005 UE_{323}	—	October 7, 2005	Kitt Peak	Spacewatch	·	1.3 km	MPC · JPL
701967	2005 UE_{328}	—	October 28, 2005	Kitt Peak	Spacewatch	·	840 m	MPC · JPL
701968	2005 UD_{329}	—	October 28, 2005	Mount Lemmon	Mount Lemmon Survey	·	690 m	MPC · JPL
701969	2005 UP_{329}	—	October 28, 2005	Mount Lemmon	Mount Lemmon Survey	EOS	1.6 km	MPC · JPL
701970	2005 UT_{331}	—	October 29, 2005	Kitt Peak	Spacewatch	·	1.1 km	MPC · JPL
701971	2005 UJ_{333}	—	October 27, 2005	Kitt Peak	Spacewatch	PHO	790 m	MPC · JPL
701972	2005 UY_{338}	—	October 31, 2005	Kitt Peak	Spacewatch	V	580 m	MPC · JPL
701973	2005 UB_{340}	—	October 31, 2005	Kitt Peak	Spacewatch	·	2.2 km	MPC · JPL
701974	2005 UD_{345}	—	October 29, 2005	Mount Lemmon	Mount Lemmon Survey	·	510 m	MPC · JPL
701975	2005 UC_{348}	—	October 31, 2005	Kitt Peak	Spacewatch	·	2.1 km	MPC · JPL
701976	2005 UT_{356}	—	October 30, 2005	Kitt Peak	Spacewatch	KOR	1.0 km	MPC · JPL
701977	2005 UP_{364}	—	October 27, 2005	Kitt Peak	Spacewatch	AGN	910 m	MPC · JPL
701978	2005 UL_{365}	—	October 27, 2005	Kitt Peak	Spacewatch	EOS	1.2 km	MPC · JPL
701979	2005 UO_{373}	—	October 27, 2005	Kitt Peak	Spacewatch	V	610 m	MPC · JPL
701980	2005 US_{379}	—	October 29, 2005	Mount Lemmon	Mount Lemmon Survey	·	570 m	MPC · JPL
701981	2005 UT_{381}	—	October 31, 2005	Kitt Peak	Spacewatch	·	490 m	MPC · JPL
701982	2005 UN_{385}	—	October 5, 2005	Catalina	CSS	BRA	1.6 km	MPC · JPL
701983	2005 UW_{387}	—	October 26, 2005	Kitt Peak	Spacewatch	·	1.4 km	MPC · JPL
701984	2005 UE_{395}	—	October 30, 2005	Mount Lemmon	Mount Lemmon Survey	THM	2.2 km	MPC · JPL
701985	2005 UQ_{399}	—	October 25, 2005	Kitt Peak	Spacewatch	·	2.0 km	MPC · JPL
701986	2005 UZ_{399}	—	October 26, 2005	Kitt Peak	Spacewatch	·	1.4 km	MPC · JPL
701987	2005 UB_{400}	—	October 26, 2005	Kitt Peak	Spacewatch	·	3.3 km	MPC · JPL
701988	2005 UX_{401}	—	October 27, 2005	Kitt Peak	Spacewatch	·	930 m	MPC · JPL
701989	2005 UK_{411}	—	October 31, 2005	Mount Lemmon	Mount Lemmon Survey	·	1.1 km	MPC · JPL
701990	2005 UD_{420}	—	October 25, 2005	Kitt Peak	Spacewatch	·	1.9 km	MPC · JPL
701991	2005 UC_{426}	—	October 28, 2005	Kitt Peak	Spacewatch	·	1.7 km	MPC · JPL
701992	2005 UP_{428}	—	October 28, 2005	Kitt Peak	Spacewatch	EOS	1.4 km	MPC · JPL
701993	2005 UN_{429}	—	October 28, 2005	Kitt Peak	Spacewatch	KOR	1.3 km	MPC · JPL
701994	2005 UM_{432}	—	October 24, 2005	Kitt Peak	Spacewatch	·	2.1 km	MPC · JPL
701995	2005 UQ_{433}	—	October 28, 2005	Kitt Peak	Spacewatch	MAR	830 m	MPC · JPL
701996	2005 UK_{434}	—	October 29, 2005	Mount Lemmon	Mount Lemmon Survey	·	1.3 km	MPC · JPL
701997	2005 UE_{447}	—	October 23, 2005	Catalina	CSS	·	1.3 km	MPC · JPL
701998	2005 UW_{448}	—	October 30, 2005	Kitt Peak	Spacewatch	·	3.3 km	MPC · JPL
701999	2005 UZ_{460}	—	October 28, 2005	Mount Lemmon	Mount Lemmon Survey	·	2.1 km	MPC · JPL
702000	2005 UV_{479}	—	October 31, 2005	Mount Lemmon	Mount Lemmon Survey	·	880 m	MPC · JPL

back to top

== Meaning of names ==
As minor planet discoveries are confirmed, they are given a permanent number by the IAU's Minor Planet Center (MPC), and the discoverers can then submit names for them, following the IAU's naming conventions. The list below concerns those minor planets in the specified number-range that have received names, and explains the meanings of those names.

Official naming citations of newly named small Solar System bodies are approved and published in a bulletin by IAU's Working Group for Small Bodies Nomenclature (WGSBN). Before May 2021, citations were published in MPC's Minor Planet Circulars for many decades. Recent citations can also be found on the JPL Small-Body Database (SBDB). Until his death in 2016, German astronomer Lutz D. Schmadel compiled these citations into the Dictionary of Minor Planet Names (DMP) and regularly updated the collection.

Based on Paul Herget's The Names of the Minor Planets, Schmadel also researched the unclear origin of numerous asteroids, most of which had been named prior to World War II. This article incorporates text from this source, which is in the public domain: SBDB New namings may only be added to this list below after official publication as the preannouncement of names is condemned. The WGSBN publishes a comprehensive guideline for the naming rules of non-cometary small Solar System bodies.

Named minor planet	Provisional	This minor planet was named for...	Ref · Catalog
701424 Piotrguzik	2004 TX_{378}	Piotr Guzik (b. 1985), a Polish post-doctoral researcher	IAU · 701424
701781 Dougjohnstone	2005 PX_{24}	Doug Johnstone (born 1966), Canadian astronomer and Principal Research Officer at the Herzberg Astronomy and Astrophysics Institute of the National Research Council of Canada.	IAU · 701781
