= List of minor planets: 433001–434000 =

The following is a partial list of minor planets, running from minor-planet number 433001 through 434000, inclusive. The primary data for this and other partial lists is based on JPL's "Small-Body Orbital Elements" and data available from the Minor Planet Center. Critical list information is also provided by the MPC, unless otherwise specified from Lowell Observatory. A detailed description of the table's columns and additional sources are given on the main page including a complete list of every page in this series, and a statistical break-up on the dynamical classification of minor planets.

Also see the summary list of all named bodies in numerical and alphabetical order, and the corresponding naming citations for the number range of this particular list. New namings may only be added to this list after official publication, as the preannouncement of names is condemned by the Working Group for Small Bodies Nomenclature of the International Astronomical Union.

Near-Earth obj.	MBA (inner)	MBA (outer)	Centaur
Mars-crosser	MBA (middle)	Jupiter trojan	Trans-Neptunian obj.
Unclassified

== 433001–433100 ==
Designation			Discovery			Properties		Ref
Permanent	Provisional	Named after	Date	Site	Discoverer(s)	Category	Diam.	Ref
433001	2012 QM_{29}	—	June 15, 2010	WISE	WISE	·	4.2 km	MPC · JPL
433002	2012 QU_{31}	—	September 19, 2003	Kitt Peak	Spacewatch	·	1.8 km	MPC · JPL
433003	2012 QE_{39}	—	May 13, 2010	Mount Lemmon	Mount Lemmon Survey	·	3.5 km	MPC · JPL
433004	2012 QQ_{41}	—	July 19, 2012	Siding Spring	SSS	·	1.9 km	MPC · JPL
433005	2012 QH_{45}	—	April 30, 2011	Mount Lemmon	Mount Lemmon Survey	·	1.9 km	MPC · JPL
433006	2012 QF_{51}	—	January 27, 2007	Kitt Peak	Spacewatch	MAS	890 m	MPC · JPL
433007	2012 RS_{6}	—	May 28, 2011	Mount Lemmon	Mount Lemmon Survey	THB	3.8 km	MPC · JPL
433008	2012 RC_{10}	—	October 15, 2007	Mount Lemmon	Mount Lemmon Survey	BRA	1.7 km	MPC · JPL
433009	2012 RY_{15}	—	January 20, 2009	Mount Lemmon	Mount Lemmon Survey	·	2.6 km	MPC · JPL
433010	2012 RT_{18}	—	August 19, 2008	Siding Spring	SSS	·	1.3 km	MPC · JPL
433011	2012 RC_{19}	—	March 18, 2010	Kitt Peak	Spacewatch	·	6.3 km	MPC · JPL
433012	2012 RO_{19}	—	August 23, 2008	Siding Spring	SSS	·	1.4 km	MPC · JPL
433013	2012 RT_{19}	—	March 11, 2005	Mount Lemmon	Mount Lemmon Survey	EOS	1.8 km	MPC · JPL
433014	2012 RO_{21}	—	October 29, 2003	Kitt Peak	Spacewatch	(13314)	2.2 km	MPC · JPL
433015	2012 RE_{26}	—	November 3, 2005	Mount Lemmon	Mount Lemmon Survey	·	1.2 km	MPC · JPL
433016	2012 RR_{28}	—	June 4, 2003	Kitt Peak	Spacewatch	·	1.8 km	MPC · JPL
433017	2012 RO_{29}	—	November 20, 2009	Kitt Peak	Spacewatch	·	1.3 km	MPC · JPL
433018	2012 RM_{32}	—	April 20, 2004	Kitt Peak	Spacewatch	·	1.1 km	MPC · JPL
433019	2012 RW_{34}	—	November 11, 2006	Kitt Peak	Spacewatch	VER	2.9 km	MPC · JPL
433020	2012 RP_{38}	—	March 18, 2010	Mount Lemmon	Mount Lemmon Survey	EOS	1.9 km	MPC · JPL
433021	2012 RB_{39}	—	October 4, 2006	Mount Lemmon	Mount Lemmon Survey	(260) · CYB	3.6 km	MPC · JPL
433022	2012 RZ_{40}	—	November 4, 2004	Kitt Peak	Spacewatch	·	1.2 km	MPC · JPL
433023	2012 RJ_{41}	—	November 26, 2003	Kitt Peak	Spacewatch	·	1.9 km	MPC · JPL
433024	2012 SY	—	April 20, 2007	Kitt Peak	Spacewatch	·	1.3 km	MPC · JPL
433025	2012 SJ_{4}	—	September 19, 2006	Catalina	CSS	·	3.5 km	MPC · JPL
433026	2012 SW_{4}	—	March 10, 2010	XuYi	PMO NEO Survey Program	·	5.6 km	MPC · JPL
433027	2012 SM_{5}	—	September 14, 2012	Catalina	CSS	EUN	1.5 km	MPC · JPL
433028	2012 SU_{7}	—	May 26, 2000	Kitt Peak	Spacewatch	MAS	860 m	MPC · JPL
433029	2012 SK_{11}	—	November 8, 2008	Kitt Peak	Spacewatch	·	1.4 km	MPC · JPL
433030	2012 SV_{11}	—	September 16, 2003	Kitt Peak	Spacewatch	NEM	2.3 km	MPC · JPL
433031	2012 SS_{12}	—	May 22, 2003	Kitt Peak	Spacewatch	·	1.1 km	MPC · JPL
433032	2012 SQ_{13}	—	March 11, 2005	Mount Lemmon	Mount Lemmon Survey	AGN	1.2 km	MPC · JPL
433033	2012 SW_{16}	—	October 2, 1995	Kitt Peak	Spacewatch	·	3.0 km	MPC · JPL
433034	2012 SZ_{17}	—	October 19, 2007	Kitt Peak	Spacewatch	·	1.8 km	MPC · JPL
433035	2012 SZ_{18}	—	October 9, 2008	Kitt Peak	Spacewatch	·	1.1 km	MPC · JPL
433036	2012 SE_{25}	—	October 10, 2007	Mount Lemmon	Mount Lemmon Survey	·	4.4 km	MPC · JPL
433037	2012 SY_{25}	—	April 13, 2011	Mount Lemmon	Mount Lemmon Survey	·	1.4 km	MPC · JPL
433038	2012 SP_{26}	—	September 23, 2008	Mount Lemmon	Mount Lemmon Survey	·	1.5 km	MPC · JPL
433039	2012 SS_{26}	—	September 12, 2006	Catalina	CSS	·	4.1 km	MPC · JPL
433040	2012 SU_{28}	—	September 28, 2003	Anderson Mesa	LONEOS	·	2.4 km	MPC · JPL
433041	2012 SL_{32}	—	September 13, 2007	Mount Lemmon	Mount Lemmon Survey	·	1.9 km	MPC · JPL
433042	2012 SX_{32}	—	June 8, 2007	Kitt Peak	Spacewatch	·	1.3 km	MPC · JPL
433043	2012 SK_{36}	—	November 7, 2008	Mount Lemmon	Mount Lemmon Survey	·	1.6 km	MPC · JPL
433044	2012 SF_{37}	—	September 11, 2007	Mount Lemmon	Mount Lemmon Survey	·	1.9 km	MPC · JPL
433045	2012 SR_{39}	—	September 18, 2003	Kitt Peak	Spacewatch	·	2.0 km	MPC · JPL
433046	2012 SP_{43}	—	September 14, 2012	Catalina	CSS	EOS	1.8 km	MPC · JPL
433047	2012 SG_{46}	—	May 15, 2007	Mount Lemmon	Mount Lemmon Survey	EUN	1.2 km	MPC · JPL
433048	2012 SV_{49}	—	May 5, 2006	Mount Lemmon	Mount Lemmon Survey	·	2.2 km	MPC · JPL
433049	2012 SJ_{51}	—	February 13, 2010	Mount Lemmon	Mount Lemmon Survey	·	2.6 km	MPC · JPL
433050	2012 SS_{54}	—	October 11, 2001	Kitt Peak	Spacewatch	EOS	1.9 km	MPC · JPL
433051	2012 SY_{57}	—	March 23, 2004	Kitt Peak	Spacewatch	·	3.4 km	MPC · JPL
433052	2012 ST_{60}	—	March 2, 2006	Mount Lemmon	Mount Lemmon Survey	·	1.7 km	MPC · JPL
433053	2012 SD_{62}	—	September 12, 2007	Mount Lemmon	Mount Lemmon Survey	·	1.7 km	MPC · JPL
433054	2012 SC_{63}	—	November 6, 2008	Kitt Peak	Spacewatch	·	2.0 km	MPC · JPL
433055	2012 SZ_{63}	—	August 14, 2006	Siding Spring	SSS	LIX	3.9 km	MPC · JPL
433056	2012 TC_{1}	—	October 10, 2007	Mount Lemmon	Mount Lemmon Survey	EOS	1.8 km	MPC · JPL
433057	2012 TK_{6}	—	October 28, 2005	Catalina	CSS	NYS	1.1 km	MPC · JPL
433058	2012 TN_{11}	—	October 23, 1995	Kitt Peak	Spacewatch	·	3.0 km	MPC · JPL
433059	2012 TS_{16}	—	October 10, 1996	Kitt Peak	Spacewatch	EOS	1.9 km	MPC · JPL
433060	2012 TM_{17}	—	October 5, 2012	Mount Lemmon	Mount Lemmon Survey	·	2.6 km	MPC · JPL
433061	2012 TL_{18}	—	March 23, 2006	Kitt Peak	Spacewatch	·	1.8 km	MPC · JPL
433062	2012 TP_{21}	—	September 9, 2008	Mount Lemmon	Mount Lemmon Survey	EUN	1.2 km	MPC · JPL
433063	2012 TS_{21}	—	February 2, 2009	Kitt Peak	Spacewatch	·	2.7 km	MPC · JPL
433064	2012 TF_{23}	—	May 9, 2010	Mount Lemmon	Mount Lemmon Survey	(31811)	2.7 km	MPC · JPL
433065	2012 TS_{24}	—	October 8, 2012	Mount Lemmon	Mount Lemmon Survey	·	1.9 km	MPC · JPL
433066	2012 TA_{26}	—	January 31, 2009	Mount Lemmon	Mount Lemmon Survey	·	2.9 km	MPC · JPL
433067	2012 TY_{27}	—	April 10, 2010	Mount Lemmon	Mount Lemmon Survey	·	2.8 km	MPC · JPL
433068	2012 TY_{28}	—	September 14, 2007	Mount Lemmon	Mount Lemmon Survey	EOS	1.6 km	MPC · JPL
433069	2012 TX_{31}	—	October 20, 2007	Mount Lemmon	Mount Lemmon Survey	·	2.2 km	MPC · JPL
433070	2012 TN_{39}	—	November 18, 2007	Mount Lemmon	Mount Lemmon Survey	·	4.5 km	MPC · JPL
433071	2012 TW_{41}	—	September 24, 2008	Kitt Peak	Spacewatch	·	1.5 km	MPC · JPL
433072	2012 TZ_{42}	—	March 8, 2005	Mount Lemmon	Mount Lemmon Survey	·	1.7 km	MPC · JPL
433073	2012 TV_{48}	—	September 24, 1995	Kitt Peak	Spacewatch	·	2.3 km	MPC · JPL
433074	2012 TA_{49}	—	April 29, 2011	Mount Lemmon	Mount Lemmon Survey	·	2.8 km	MPC · JPL
433075	2012 TU_{57}	—	October 16, 2007	Mount Lemmon	Mount Lemmon Survey	·	2.0 km	MPC · JPL
433076	2012 TG_{58}	—	November 1, 2007	Kitt Peak	Spacewatch	·	2.4 km	MPC · JPL
433077	2012 TY_{59}	—	April 10, 2010	Mount Lemmon	Mount Lemmon Survey	EOS	2.1 km	MPC · JPL
433078	2012 TB_{60}	—	February 18, 2010	Kitt Peak	Spacewatch	KOR	1.6 km	MPC · JPL
433079	2012 TU_{66}	—	October 19, 2006	Kitt Peak	Spacewatch	·	3.5 km	MPC · JPL
433080	2012 TW_{66}	—	October 16, 2007	Kitt Peak	Spacewatch	EOS	2.2 km	MPC · JPL
433081	2012 TP_{73}	—	January 28, 2004	Kitt Peak	Spacewatch	·	2.2 km	MPC · JPL
433082	2012 TY_{73}	—	October 20, 2007	Mount Lemmon	Mount Lemmon Survey	·	2.8 km	MPC · JPL
433083	2012 TR_{75}	—	March 7, 2011	Siding Spring	SSS	·	1.5 km	MPC · JPL
433084	2012 TY_{75}	—	October 21, 2006	Kitt Peak	Spacewatch	·	3.9 km	MPC · JPL
433085	2012 TL_{76}	—	April 12, 2002	Socorro	LINEAR	·	1.8 km	MPC · JPL
433086	2012 TD_{78}	—	January 18, 2009	Kitt Peak	Spacewatch	·	2.7 km	MPC · JPL
433087	2012 TW_{81}	—	October 2, 1995	Kitt Peak	Spacewatch	·	2.8 km	MPC · JPL
433088	2012 TB_{85}	—	April 16, 2004	Kitt Peak	Spacewatch	VER	2.6 km	MPC · JPL
433089	2012 TB_{86}	—	November 9, 2007	Kitt Peak	Spacewatch	EMA	3.4 km	MPC · JPL
433090	2012 TO_{86}	—	January 31, 2009	Mount Lemmon	Mount Lemmon Survey	·	2.9 km	MPC · JPL
433091	2012 TD_{87}	—	September 22, 2008	Mount Lemmon	Mount Lemmon Survey	·	1.2 km	MPC · JPL
433092	2012 TR_{87}	—	April 2, 2005	Mount Lemmon	Mount Lemmon Survey	·	1.9 km	MPC · JPL
433093	2012 TS_{87}	—	September 19, 2007	Kitt Peak	Spacewatch	AGN	1.5 km	MPC · JPL
433094	2012 TL_{90}	—	October 8, 2007	Mount Lemmon	Mount Lemmon Survey	EOS	1.8 km	MPC · JPL
433095	2012 TA_{92}	—	September 22, 2008	Kitt Peak	Spacewatch	·	1.1 km	MPC · JPL
433096	2012 TV_{93}	—	March 11, 2005	Mount Lemmon	Mount Lemmon Survey	·	2.2 km	MPC · JPL
433097	2012 TD_{95}	—	August 27, 2006	Kitt Peak	Spacewatch	·	3.1 km	MPC · JPL
433098	2012 TC_{97}	—	October 8, 2012	Kitt Peak	Spacewatch	·	3.6 km	MPC · JPL
433099	2012 TM_{97}	—	April 7, 2005	Kitt Peak	Spacewatch	EOS	1.8 km	MPC · JPL
433100	2012 TS_{99}	—	September 19, 1995	Kitt Peak	Spacewatch	·	2.1 km	MPC · JPL

== 433101–433200 ==
back to top

Designation			Discovery			Properties		Ref
Permanent	Provisional	Named after	Date	Site	Discoverer(s)	Category	Diam.	Ref
433101	2012 TY_{103}	—	March 16, 2004	Kitt Peak	Spacewatch	·	2.7 km	MPC · JPL
433102	2012 TG_{105}	—	August 29, 2006	Kitt Peak	Spacewatch	·	3.0 km	MPC · JPL
433103	2012 TU_{106}	—	October 11, 1996	Kitt Peak	Spacewatch	EOS	1.6 km	MPC · JPL
433104	2012 TP_{108}	—	January 16, 2009	Mount Lemmon	Mount Lemmon Survey	VER	2.6 km	MPC · JPL
433105	2012 TG_{110}	—	January 20, 2009	Kitt Peak	Spacewatch	·	2.9 km	MPC · JPL
433106	2012 TV_{114}	—	April 8, 2010	Catalina	CSS	·	3.5 km	MPC · JPL
433107	2012 TP_{122}	—	September 28, 2008	Mount Lemmon	Mount Lemmon Survey	·	1.6 km	MPC · JPL
433108	2012 TN_{123}	—	July 11, 2005	Kitt Peak	Spacewatch	·	3.9 km	MPC · JPL
433109	2012 TP_{123}	—	October 20, 2003	Kitt Peak	Spacewatch	AGN	1.4 km	MPC · JPL
433110	2012 TE_{125}	—	April 30, 2011	Mount Lemmon	Mount Lemmon Survey	ADE	2.5 km	MPC · JPL
433111	2012 TM_{125}	—	September 12, 2001	Socorro	LINEAR	·	2.9 km	MPC · JPL
433112	2012 TO_{132}	—	September 25, 2007	Mount Lemmon	Mount Lemmon Survey	EOS	1.8 km	MPC · JPL
433113	2012 TU_{133}	—	December 30, 2005	Kitt Peak	Spacewatch	RAF	2.9 km	MPC · JPL
433114	2012 TQ_{136}	—	September 24, 2012	Kitt Peak	Spacewatch	·	2.9 km	MPC · JPL
433115	2012 TM_{138}	—	April 20, 2007	Mount Lemmon	Mount Lemmon Survey	·	1.2 km	MPC · JPL
433116	2012 TH_{143}	—	October 16, 2003	Kitt Peak	Spacewatch	·	2.2 km	MPC · JPL
433117	2012 TM_{150}	—	February 24, 2006	Kitt Peak	Spacewatch	·	1.6 km	MPC · JPL
433118	2012 TO_{160}	—	April 4, 2005	Mount Lemmon	Mount Lemmon Survey	·	1.6 km	MPC · JPL
433119	2012 TE_{161}	—	September 30, 2006	Mount Lemmon	Mount Lemmon Survey	·	2.6 km	MPC · JPL
433120	2012 TE_{167}	—	April 2, 2006	Kitt Peak	Spacewatch	·	2.0 km	MPC · JPL
433121	2012 TD_{170}	—	October 18, 2007	Mount Lemmon	Mount Lemmon Survey	·	3.5 km	MPC · JPL
433122	2012 TO_{170}	—	March 25, 2006	Kitt Peak	Spacewatch	·	2.1 km	MPC · JPL
433123	2012 TQ_{171}	—	October 2, 1999	Kitt Peak	Spacewatch	·	2.0 km	MPC · JPL
433124	2012 TR_{173}	—	May 7, 2000	Kitt Peak	Spacewatch	·	2.0 km	MPC · JPL
433125	2012 TS_{174}	—	September 10, 2007	Mount Lemmon	Mount Lemmon Survey	·	2.7 km	MPC · JPL
433126	2012 TV_{175}	—	September 22, 2008	Kitt Peak	Spacewatch	·	1.2 km	MPC · JPL
433127	2012 TB_{176}	—	May 13, 2007	Mount Lemmon	Mount Lemmon Survey	·	1.2 km	MPC · JPL
433128	2012 TE_{181}	—	August 18, 2006	Kitt Peak	Spacewatch	VER	2.3 km	MPC · JPL
433129	2012 TM_{184}	—	September 11, 2007	Mount Lemmon	Mount Lemmon Survey	·	2.1 km	MPC · JPL
433130	2012 TZ_{185}	—	June 10, 2007	Siding Spring	SSS	·	2.5 km	MPC · JPL
433131	2012 TK_{188}	—	March 4, 2006	Kitt Peak	Spacewatch	·	1.4 km	MPC · JPL
433132	2012 TG_{191}	—	December 6, 2005	Kitt Peak	Spacewatch	3:2 · (6124)	4.2 km	MPC · JPL
433133	2012 TN_{194}	—	September 18, 1995	Kitt Peak	Spacewatch	(5)	1.2 km	MPC · JPL
433134	2012 TW_{199}	—	November 20, 2001	Socorro	LINEAR	·	3.5 km	MPC · JPL
433135	2012 TF_{204}	—	September 10, 2007	Kitt Peak	Spacewatch	·	1.9 km	MPC · JPL
433136	2012 TR_{212}	—	August 29, 2006	Kitt Peak	Spacewatch	·	3.2 km	MPC · JPL
433137	2012 TS_{217}	—	March 16, 2007	Kitt Peak	Spacewatch	·	1.2 km	MPC · JPL
433138	2012 TN_{221}	—	October 9, 2007	Kitt Peak	Spacewatch	·	2.3 km	MPC · JPL
433139	2012 TW_{223}	—	August 29, 2006	Kitt Peak	Spacewatch	·	2.9 km	MPC · JPL
433140	2012 TF_{227}	—	September 25, 1995	Kitt Peak	Spacewatch	·	2.9 km	MPC · JPL
433141	2012 TM_{228}	—	February 1, 2006	Kitt Peak	Spacewatch	MIS	2.5 km	MPC · JPL
433142	2012 TQ_{228}	—	September 14, 2007	Mount Lemmon	Mount Lemmon Survey	·	2.2 km	MPC · JPL
433143	2012 TC_{230}	—	February 8, 2010	WISE	WISE	·	3.7 km	MPC · JPL
433144	2012 TH_{231}	—	September 26, 2006	Catalina	CSS	·	4.0 km	MPC · JPL
433145	2012 TD_{235}	—	March 17, 2004	Kitt Peak	Spacewatch	·	2.8 km	MPC · JPL
433146	2012 TA_{236}	—	January 16, 2005	Kitt Peak	Spacewatch	·	2.5 km	MPC · JPL
433147	2012 TH_{240}	—	March 2, 2009	Mount Lemmon	Mount Lemmon Survey	·	3.4 km	MPC · JPL
433148	2012 TJ_{240}	—	March 17, 2010	Kitt Peak	Spacewatch	·	3.1 km	MPC · JPL
433149	2012 TU_{240}	—	May 13, 2004	Kitt Peak	Spacewatch	·	3.6 km	MPC · JPL
433150	2012 TD_{241}	—	December 30, 2007	Mount Lemmon	Mount Lemmon Survey	·	3.0 km	MPC · JPL
433151	2012 TV_{241}	—	May 3, 2005	Kitt Peak	Spacewatch	·	3.3 km	MPC · JPL
433152	2012 TY_{241}	—	September 19, 2007	Kitt Peak	Spacewatch	·	1.6 km	MPC · JPL
433153	2012 TQ_{242}	—	October 5, 2003	Kitt Peak	Spacewatch	NEM	2.2 km	MPC · JPL
433154	2012 TZ_{242}	—	November 3, 2007	Kitt Peak	Spacewatch	·	2.0 km	MPC · JPL
433155	2012 TN_{243}	—	December 2, 2008	Kitt Peak	Spacewatch	·	3.3 km	MPC · JPL
433156	2012 TV_{244}	—	October 26, 2008	Mount Lemmon	Mount Lemmon Survey	·	1.6 km	MPC · JPL
433157	2012 TZ_{247}	—	February 20, 2006	Kitt Peak	Spacewatch	·	1.7 km	MPC · JPL
433158	2012 TN_{249}	—	September 28, 2006	Kitt Peak	Spacewatch	·	3.1 km	MPC · JPL
433159	2012 TN_{255}	—	September 4, 2008	Kitt Peak	Spacewatch	·	2.4 km	MPC · JPL
433160	2012 TY_{255}	—	September 11, 2007	Kitt Peak	Spacewatch	KOR	1.5 km	MPC · JPL
433161	2012 TB_{258}	—	March 13, 2007	Mount Lemmon	Mount Lemmon Survey	·	1.1 km	MPC · JPL
433162	2012 TL_{258}	—	October 12, 2004	Kitt Peak	Spacewatch	3:2	3.7 km	MPC · JPL
433163	2012 TF_{259}	—	September 10, 2007	Kitt Peak	Spacewatch	·	1.9 km	MPC · JPL
433164	2012 TL_{259}	—	September 4, 2007	Mount Lemmon	Mount Lemmon Survey	·	1.7 km	MPC · JPL
433165	2012 TW_{260}	—	May 6, 2006	Mount Lemmon	Mount Lemmon Survey	·	2.3 km	MPC · JPL
433166	2012 TV_{263}	—	October 7, 2007	Kitt Peak	Spacewatch	·	2.1 km	MPC · JPL
433167	2012 TE_{278}	—	May 11, 2010	Kitt Peak	Spacewatch	·	3.5 km	MPC · JPL
433168	2012 TH_{286}	—	October 21, 2008	Kitt Peak	Spacewatch	EUN	1.3 km	MPC · JPL
433169	2012 TK_{289}	—	August 27, 2006	Kitt Peak	Spacewatch	·	2.9 km	MPC · JPL
433170	2012 TW_{289}	—	January 31, 2009	Mount Lemmon	Mount Lemmon Survey	EOS	1.8 km	MPC · JPL
433171	2012 TH_{291}	—	October 15, 2012	Mount Lemmon	Mount Lemmon Survey	·	2.9 km	MPC · JPL
433172	2012 TM_{295}	—	October 16, 2007	Catalina	CSS	·	3.1 km	MPC · JPL
433173	2012 TR_{295}	—	October 17, 2003	Kitt Peak	Spacewatch	·	2.4 km	MPC · JPL
433174	2012 TJ_{296}	—	May 19, 2005	Mount Lemmon	Mount Lemmon Survey	EOS	2.2 km	MPC · JPL
433175	2012 TF_{298}	—	May 9, 2005	Kitt Peak	Spacewatch	·	2.9 km	MPC · JPL
433176	2012 TL_{304}	—	March 16, 2007	Mount Lemmon	Mount Lemmon Survey	·	1.6 km	MPC · JPL
433177	2012 TR_{305}	—	March 4, 2011	Mount Lemmon	Mount Lemmon Survey	·	1.7 km	MPC · JPL
433178	2012 TW_{307}	—	January 12, 2010	WISE	WISE	·	4.0 km	MPC · JPL
433179	2012 TQ_{308}	—	October 15, 2007	Mount Lemmon	Mount Lemmon Survey	·	2.7 km	MPC · JPL
433180	2012 TM_{314}	—	July 30, 2008	Mount Lemmon	Mount Lemmon Survey	·	1.7 km	MPC · JPL
433181	2012 TT_{314}	—	May 10, 2003	Kitt Peak	Spacewatch	·	1.4 km	MPC · JPL
433182	2012 TV_{314}	—	October 13, 2004	Socorro	LINEAR	·	2.0 km	MPC · JPL
433183	2012 TH_{315}	—	January 13, 2005	Kitt Peak	Spacewatch	·	2.1 km	MPC · JPL
433184	2012 TN_{317}	—	September 17, 2012	Kitt Peak	Spacewatch	T_{j} (2.99) · 3:2	4.1 km	MPC · JPL
433185	2012 TE_{318}	—	February 14, 2009	Mount Lemmon	Mount Lemmon Survey	EOS	2.0 km	MPC · JPL
433186	2012 TV_{322}	—	March 12, 2007	Kitt Peak	Spacewatch	KON	2.1 km	MPC · JPL
433187	2012 UA_{4}	—	March 23, 2006	Kitt Peak	Spacewatch	·	3.6 km	MPC · JPL
433188	2012 US_{8}	—	September 23, 2012	Kitt Peak	Spacewatch	·	2.3 km	MPC · JPL
433189	2012 UF_{13}	—	October 16, 2001	Kitt Peak	Spacewatch	·	2.5 km	MPC · JPL
433190	2012 UZ_{17}	—	May 13, 2010	Mount Lemmon	Mount Lemmon Survey	·	2.4 km	MPC · JPL
433191	2012 UF_{19}	—	October 1, 2008	Mount Lemmon	Mount Lemmon Survey	·	1.4 km	MPC · JPL
433192	2012 UM_{23}	—	December 31, 2008	Kitt Peak	Spacewatch	EOS	1.9 km	MPC · JPL
433193	2012 UZ_{24}	—	November 19, 2007	Mount Lemmon	Mount Lemmon Survey	·	2.8 km	MPC · JPL
433194	2012 UO_{31}	—	May 9, 2010	Mount Lemmon	Mount Lemmon Survey	·	3.4 km	MPC · JPL
433195	2012 UR_{34}	—	January 18, 2010	WISE	WISE	·	3.9 km	MPC · JPL
433196	2012 UP_{42}	—	October 9, 2007	Mount Lemmon	Mount Lemmon Survey	·	2.4 km	MPC · JPL
433197	2012 UD_{47}	—	May 19, 2010	Mount Lemmon	Mount Lemmon Survey	·	3.1 km	MPC · JPL
433198	2012 UA_{49}	—	October 28, 2008	Kitt Peak	Spacewatch	·	1.7 km	MPC · JPL
433199	2012 UH_{50}	—	September 12, 2006	Catalina	CSS	·	3.8 km	MPC · JPL
433200	2012 UM_{51}	—	March 21, 2010	Mount Lemmon	Mount Lemmon Survey	·	2.5 km	MPC · JPL

== 433201–433300 ==
back to top

Designation			Discovery			Properties		Ref
Permanent	Provisional	Named after	Date	Site	Discoverer(s)	Category	Diam.	Ref
433201	2012 UT_{57}	—	October 5, 2003	Kitt Peak	Spacewatch	·	3.8 km	MPC · JPL
433202	2012 UX_{62}	—	November 16, 2006	Kitt Peak	Spacewatch	CYB	4.2 km	MPC · JPL
433203	2012 UT_{63}	—	May 4, 2005	Kitt Peak	Spacewatch	·	2.9 km	MPC · JPL
433204	2012 UZ_{63}	—	October 17, 2001	Socorro	LINEAR	·	1.4 km	MPC · JPL
433205	2012 UT_{75}	—	September 10, 2007	Mount Lemmon	Mount Lemmon Survey	·	1.7 km	MPC · JPL
433206	2012 UG_{77}	—	September 14, 2006	Catalina	CSS	·	3.3 km	MPC · JPL
433207	2012 UJ_{91}	—	September 19, 2003	Kitt Peak	Spacewatch	·	2.2 km	MPC · JPL
433208	2012 UH_{95}	—	September 6, 2008	Mount Lemmon	Mount Lemmon Survey	·	1.4 km	MPC · JPL
433209	2012 UR_{100}	—	November 18, 2001	Kitt Peak	Spacewatch	·	3.3 km	MPC · JPL
433210	2012 UZ_{105}	—	September 20, 2001	Socorro	LINEAR	·	2.6 km	MPC · JPL
433211	2012 UW_{107}	—	March 18, 2004	Kitt Peak	Spacewatch	EOS	2.1 km	MPC · JPL
433212	2012 UH_{108}	—	October 8, 2007	Kitt Peak	Spacewatch	·	2.1 km	MPC · JPL
433213	2012 UP_{110}	—	October 21, 2003	Palomar	NEAT	·	2.5 km	MPC · JPL
433214	2012 UU_{115}	—	October 10, 2007	Mount Lemmon	Mount Lemmon Survey	·	2.2 km	MPC · JPL
433215	2012 UW_{115}	—	August 29, 2006	Kitt Peak	Spacewatch	·	2.5 km	MPC · JPL
433216	2012 UM_{117}	—	October 19, 2003	Kitt Peak	Spacewatch	EUN	1.2 km	MPC · JPL
433217	2012 UD_{128}	—	October 17, 2012	Mount Lemmon	Mount Lemmon Survey	EOS	1.8 km	MPC · JPL
433218	2012 UX_{132}	—	November 7, 2008	Mount Lemmon	Mount Lemmon Survey	·	1.5 km	MPC · JPL
433219	2012 UN_{139}	—	August 27, 2006	Kitt Peak	Spacewatch	·	2.8 km	MPC · JPL
433220	2012 UZ_{139}	—	January 17, 2009	Kitt Peak	Spacewatch	·	2.9 km	MPC · JPL
433221	2012 UJ_{140}	—	December 22, 2008	Kitt Peak	Spacewatch	EOS	3.2 km	MPC · JPL
433222	2012 UY_{140}	—	September 7, 2008	Mount Lemmon	Mount Lemmon Survey	·	1.8 km	MPC · JPL
433223	2012 UP_{148}	—	October 19, 1995	Kitt Peak	Spacewatch	·	3.3 km	MPC · JPL
433224	2012 UR_{148}	—	September 12, 2007	Mount Lemmon	Mount Lemmon Survey	HOF	3.1 km	MPC · JPL
433225	2012 UX_{148}	—	April 5, 2010	Kitt Peak	Spacewatch	·	2.8 km	MPC · JPL
433226	2012 UY_{150}	—	October 21, 2012	Kitt Peak	Spacewatch	·	3.7 km	MPC · JPL
433227	2012 UU_{159}	—	March 2, 2006	Kitt Peak	Spacewatch	·	1.8 km	MPC · JPL
433228	2012 VA_{1}	—	October 17, 2012	Mount Lemmon	Mount Lemmon Survey	·	3.3 km	MPC · JPL
433229	2012 VX_{11}	—	October 9, 2007	Mount Lemmon	Mount Lemmon Survey	KOR	1.4 km	MPC · JPL
433230	2012 VE_{13}	—	May 13, 2011	Mount Lemmon	Mount Lemmon Survey	·	1.9 km	MPC · JPL
433231	2012 VT_{14}	—	August 29, 2006	Kitt Peak	Spacewatch	·	2.7 km	MPC · JPL
433232	2012 VN_{33}	—	February 1, 2009	Kitt Peak	Spacewatch	·	2.7 km	MPC · JPL
433233	2012 VK_{43}	—	August 21, 2007	Siding Spring	SSS	·	2.8 km	MPC · JPL
433234	2012 VS_{48}	—	October 10, 2007	Kitt Peak	Spacewatch	·	2.0 km	MPC · JPL
433235	2012 VU_{49}	—	April 7, 2006	Kitt Peak	Spacewatch	·	1.4 km	MPC · JPL
433236	2012 VY_{52}	—	September 17, 1995	Kitt Peak	Spacewatch	·	2.3 km	MPC · JPL
433237	2012 VB_{57}	—	October 16, 2012	Kitt Peak	Spacewatch	·	1.8 km	MPC · JPL
433238	2012 VR_{63}	—	September 16, 2006	Catalina	CSS	·	3.2 km	MPC · JPL
433239	2012 VK_{65}	—	June 2, 2010	WISE	WISE	·	3.1 km	MPC · JPL
433240	2012 VO_{65}	—	April 16, 2004	Kitt Peak	Spacewatch	·	3.9 km	MPC · JPL
433241	2012 VB_{68}	—	October 27, 2006	Kitt Peak	Spacewatch	CYB	3.4 km	MPC · JPL
433242	2012 VP_{71}	—	December 18, 2001	Socorro	LINEAR	·	3.6 km	MPC · JPL
433243	2012 VS_{83}	—	September 28, 2006	Catalina	CSS	T_{j} (2.94)	4.9 km	MPC · JPL
433244	2012 VR_{93}	—	September 26, 2006	Mount Lemmon	Mount Lemmon Survey	·	3.3 km	MPC · JPL
433245	2012 VA_{96}	—	November 23, 1995	Kitt Peak	Spacewatch	EUN	1.3 km	MPC · JPL
433246	2012 VG_{96}	—	October 9, 2012	Mount Lemmon	Mount Lemmon Survey	·	1.9 km	MPC · JPL
433247	2012 VS_{96}	—	November 7, 2007	Mount Lemmon	Mount Lemmon Survey	EOS	2.2 km	MPC · JPL
433248	2012 VB_{97}	—	November 11, 2004	Kitt Peak	Spacewatch	(5)	1.4 km	MPC · JPL
433249	2012 VL_{101}	—	August 23, 2001	Kitt Peak	Spacewatch	·	1.8 km	MPC · JPL
433250	2012 VP_{102}	—	March 3, 2009	Kitt Peak	Spacewatch	·	3.1 km	MPC · JPL
433251	2012 VT_{109}	—	May 19, 2010	Mount Lemmon	Mount Lemmon Survey	·	4.1 km	MPC · JPL
433252	2012 WR_{6}	—	March 18, 2009	Kitt Peak	Spacewatch	·	3.0 km	MPC · JPL
433253	2012 WO_{11}	—	May 8, 2006	Kitt Peak	Spacewatch	·	2.5 km	MPC · JPL
433254	2012 WJ_{17}	—	October 3, 2006	Mount Lemmon	Mount Lemmon Survey	·	3.1 km	MPC · JPL
433255	2012 WP_{28}	—	November 17, 2007	Kitt Peak	Spacewatch	·	2.3 km	MPC · JPL
433256	2012 WB_{29}	—	March 3, 2009	Mount Lemmon	Mount Lemmon Survey	·	4.0 km	MPC · JPL
433257	2012 XT_{29}	—	September 8, 1999	Catalina	CSS	(5)	1.6 km	MPC · JPL
433258	2012 XP_{33}	—	January 1, 2008	Mount Lemmon	Mount Lemmon Survey	·	3.1 km	MPC · JPL
433259	2012 XN_{37}	—	September 25, 2006	Catalina	CSS	·	3.4 km	MPC · JPL
433260	2012 XP_{63}	—	July 10, 2007	Siding Spring	SSS	EUN	1.3 km	MPC · JPL
433261	2012 XD_{66}	—	July 30, 1995	Kitt Peak	Spacewatch	·	2.2 km	MPC · JPL
433262	2012 XQ_{78}	—	November 2, 2007	Mount Lemmon	Mount Lemmon Survey	·	3.7 km	MPC · JPL
433263	2012 XX_{84}	—	June 24, 2011	Mount Lemmon	Mount Lemmon Survey	·	2.5 km	MPC · JPL
433264	2012 XU_{94}	—	November 3, 2007	Mount Lemmon	Mount Lemmon Survey	·	3.5 km	MPC · JPL
433265	2012 XZ_{114}	—	November 19, 2003	Anderson Mesa	LONEOS	·	2.6 km	MPC · JPL
433266	2012 XM_{129}	—	October 19, 2007	Mount Lemmon	Mount Lemmon Survey	·	3.8 km	MPC · JPL
433267	2012 XW_{134}	—	December 17, 2007	Mount Lemmon	Mount Lemmon Survey	·	3.8 km	MPC · JPL
433268	2012 XU_{150}	—	May 25, 2001	Kitt Peak	Spacewatch	·	2.4 km	MPC · JPL
433269	2013 AH_{38}	—	March 18, 2004	Kitt Peak	Spacewatch	L4	8.5 km	MPC · JPL
433270	2013 AA_{39}	—	January 5, 2013	Kitt Peak	Spacewatch	L4	10 km	MPC · JPL
433271	2013 AH_{56}	—	October 13, 2010	Mount Lemmon	Mount Lemmon Survey	L4	7.1 km	MPC · JPL
433272	2013 AE_{60}	—	November 10, 2010	Mount Lemmon	Mount Lemmon Survey	L4	7.9 km	MPC · JPL
433273	2013 AQ_{76}	—	January 10, 2013	Mount Lemmon	Mount Lemmon Survey	L4	10 km	MPC · JPL
433274	2013 AO_{91}	—	October 20, 2012	Mount Lemmon	Mount Lemmon Survey	L4	10 km	MPC · JPL
433275	2013 AT_{93}	—	September 4, 2008	Kitt Peak	Spacewatch	L4	10 km	MPC · JPL
433276	2013 AX_{100}	—	January 18, 2010	WISE	WISE	L4	10 km	MPC · JPL
433277	2013 AT_{108}	—	November 8, 2010	Mount Lemmon	Mount Lemmon Survey	L4	7.6 km	MPC · JPL
433278	2013 AB_{119}	—	February 20, 2002	Kitt Peak	Spacewatch	L4	6.5 km	MPC · JPL
433279	2013 AP_{129}	—	December 2, 2010	Mount Lemmon	Mount Lemmon Survey	L4	9.3 km	MPC · JPL
433280	2013 AU_{130}	—	January 5, 2013	Kitt Peak	Spacewatch	L4	10 km	MPC · JPL
433281	2013 AW_{130}	—	September 24, 2009	Mount Lemmon	Mount Lemmon Survey	L4	6.9 km	MPC · JPL
433282	2013 AR_{137}	—	October 30, 2010	Mount Lemmon	Mount Lemmon Survey	L4	7.0 km	MPC · JPL
433283	2013 BK	—	September 27, 2009	Mount Lemmon	Mount Lemmon Survey	L4	7.9 km	MPC · JPL
433284	2013 BV	—	September 16, 2009	Kitt Peak	Spacewatch	L4	7.3 km	MPC · JPL
433285	2013 BP_{10}	—	November 12, 2012	Mount Lemmon	Mount Lemmon Survey	L4	7.4 km	MPC · JPL
433286	2013 BV_{17}	—	August 24, 2008	Kitt Peak	Spacewatch	L4	8.0 km	MPC · JPL
433287	2013 BU_{44}	—	September 15, 2009	Kitt Peak	Spacewatch	L4 · ERY	7.4 km	MPC · JPL
433288	2013 BL_{51}	—	September 27, 2009	Mount Lemmon	Mount Lemmon Survey	L4	7.8 km	MPC · JPL
433289	2013 BF_{54}	—	October 17, 2010	Mount Lemmon	Mount Lemmon Survey	L4	7.7 km	MPC · JPL
433290	2013 BW_{80}	—	January 16, 2010	WISE	WISE	L4	10 km	MPC · JPL
433291	2013 CB_{53}	—	September 29, 2009	Mount Lemmon	Mount Lemmon Survey	L4	8.2 km	MPC · JPL
433292	2013 CL_{141}	—	September 29, 2009	Mount Lemmon	Mount Lemmon Survey	L4	8.7 km	MPC · JPL
433293	2013 CW_{182}	—	November 8, 2010	Kitt Peak	Spacewatch	L4	8.4 km	MPC · JPL
433294	2013 CO_{197}	—	September 14, 2007	Kitt Peak	Spacewatch	L4	7.0 km	MPC · JPL
433295	2013 CV_{209}	—	July 29, 2008	Mount Lemmon	Mount Lemmon Survey	L4	7.9 km	MPC · JPL
433296	2013 DT_{7}	—	September 29, 2009	Kitt Peak	Spacewatch	L4	7.6 km	MPC · JPL
433297	2013 DE_{13}	—	October 26, 2009	Mount Lemmon	Mount Lemmon Survey	L4 · ERY	7.4 km	MPC · JPL
433298	2013 ES_{2}	—	November 1, 2010	Kitt Peak	Spacewatch	L4	9.9 km	MPC · JPL
433299	2013 ES_{111}	—	September 22, 2006	Anderson Mesa	LONEOS	H	590 m	MPC · JPL
433300	2013 JC_{51}	—	March 1, 2009	Kitt Peak	Spacewatch	·	970 m	MPC · JPL

== 433301–433400 ==
back to top

Designation			Discovery			Properties		Ref
Permanent	Provisional	Named after	Date	Site	Discoverer(s)	Category	Diam.	Ref
433301	2013 LD_{29}	—	July 3, 2008	Siding Spring	SSS	H	720 m	MPC · JPL
433302	2013 LG_{31}	—	December 5, 2005	Mount Lemmon	Mount Lemmon Survey	H	650 m	MPC · JPL
433303	2013 NX	—	July 2, 2013	Haleakala	Pan-STARRS 1	APO · critical · fast	140 m	MPC · JPL
433304	2013 NF_{8}	—	January 13, 2011	Catalina	CSS	EUN	1.5 km	MPC · JPL
433305	2013 ND_{22}	—	March 5, 2006	Kitt Peak	Spacewatch	·	1.7 km	MPC · JPL
433306	2013 OQ	—	August 30, 2002	Anderson Mesa	LONEOS	·	3.8 km	MPC · JPL
433307	2013 PG_{6}	—	September 12, 2005	Kitt Peak	Spacewatch	H	500 m	MPC · JPL
433308	2013 PR_{6}	—	May 21, 2010	Mount Lemmon	Mount Lemmon Survey	H	430 m	MPC · JPL
433309	2013 PM_{20}	—	December 11, 2010	Kitt Peak	Spacewatch	·	2.4 km	MPC · JPL
433310	2013 PQ_{31}	—	December 5, 2002	Kitt Peak	Spacewatch	THB	3.1 km	MPC · JPL
433311	2013 PJ_{33}	—	January 26, 2004	Anderson Mesa	LONEOS	·	1.3 km	MPC · JPL
433312	2013 PJ_{38}	—	January 10, 2011	Mount Lemmon	Mount Lemmon Survey	·	1.3 km	MPC · JPL
433313	2013 PL_{38}	—	January 8, 2011	Mount Lemmon	Mount Lemmon Survey	·	1.2 km	MPC · JPL
433314	2013 PB_{40}	—	November 15, 2010	Mount Lemmon	Mount Lemmon Survey	·	1.1 km	MPC · JPL
433315	2013 PG_{64}	—	April 2, 2005	Mount Lemmon	Mount Lemmon Survey	·	2.9 km	MPC · JPL
433316	2013 PU_{73}	—	January 4, 2011	Mount Lemmon	Mount Lemmon Survey	·	1.6 km	MPC · JPL
433317	2013 PX_{73}	—	April 8, 2008	Mount Lemmon	Mount Lemmon Survey	·	1.4 km	MPC · JPL
433318	2013 QC_{3}	—	October 16, 1998	Kitt Peak	Spacewatch	·	1.1 km	MPC · JPL
433319	2013 QG_{26}	—	September 16, 2006	Catalina	CSS	·	1.1 km	MPC · JPL
433320	2013 QS_{29}	—	February 3, 2012	Mount Lemmon	Mount Lemmon Survey	·	880 m	MPC · JPL
433321	2013 QD_{36}	—	May 8, 2005	Kitt Peak	Spacewatch	H	520 m	MPC · JPL
433322	2013 QE_{36}	—	September 7, 2008	Mount Lemmon	Mount Lemmon Survey	H	500 m	MPC · JPL
433323	2013 QW_{57}	—	July 30, 2009	Catalina	CSS	·	1.5 km	MPC · JPL
433324	2013 QL_{65}	—	April 11, 2005	Kitt Peak	Spacewatch	V	640 m	MPC · JPL
433325	2013 QM_{66}	—	December 4, 2005	Kitt Peak	Spacewatch	·	1.9 km	MPC · JPL
433326	2013 QP_{71}	—	November 8, 2008	Mount Lemmon	Mount Lemmon Survey	·	1.6 km	MPC · JPL
433327	2013 QM_{73}	—	October 4, 1999	Socorro	LINEAR	·	830 m	MPC · JPL
433328	2013 QY_{79}	—	December 6, 2010	Kitt Peak	Spacewatch	·	940 m	MPC · JPL
433329	2013 QG_{80}	—	March 12, 2007	Kitt Peak	Spacewatch	H	580 m	MPC · JPL
433330	2013 QU_{85}	—	January 17, 2007	Mount Lemmon	Mount Lemmon Survey	H	560 m	MPC · JPL
433331	2013 RZ	—	August 18, 2006	Kitt Peak	Spacewatch	·	710 m	MPC · JPL
433332	2013 RE_{3}	—	January 28, 2011	Mount Lemmon	Mount Lemmon Survey	NYS	1.0 km	MPC · JPL
433333	2013 RO_{25}	—	July 30, 2009	Kitt Peak	Spacewatch	·	1.4 km	MPC · JPL
433334	2013 RX_{27}	—	April 5, 2005	Mount Lemmon	Mount Lemmon Survey	·	740 m	MPC · JPL
433335	2013 RP_{30}	—	January 16, 2011	Mount Lemmon	Mount Lemmon Survey	NYS	1.2 km	MPC · JPL
433336	2013 RL_{35}	—	September 23, 2008	Kitt Peak	Spacewatch	·	2.2 km	MPC · JPL
433337	2013 RN_{40}	—	February 25, 2011	Mount Lemmon	Mount Lemmon Survey	MAS	680 m	MPC · JPL
433338	2013 RM_{41}	—	November 15, 2006	Mount Lemmon	Mount Lemmon Survey	MAS	860 m	MPC · JPL
433339	2013 RB_{43}	—	October 28, 2008	Catalina	CSS	H	540 m	MPC · JPL
433340	2013 RW_{43}	—	October 24, 2003	Socorro	LINEAR	·	690 m	MPC · JPL
433341	2013 RO_{44}	—	January 23, 2011	Mount Lemmon	Mount Lemmon Survey	MAS	750 m	MPC · JPL
433342	2013 RP_{45}	—	March 14, 2007	Kitt Peak	Spacewatch	·	1.7 km	MPC · JPL
433343	2013 RS_{47}	—	September 25, 2006	Mount Lemmon	Mount Lemmon Survey	·	670 m	MPC · JPL
433344	2013 RL_{52}	—	October 1, 2009	Mount Lemmon	Mount Lemmon Survey	·	2.7 km	MPC · JPL
433345	2013 RW_{62}	—	September 18, 2003	Kitt Peak	Spacewatch	·	630 m	MPC · JPL
433346	2013 RZ_{65}	—	April 28, 2012	Mount Lemmon	Mount Lemmon Survey	·	1.0 km	MPC · JPL
433347	2013 RU_{66}	—	August 17, 2009	Kitt Peak	Spacewatch	EUN	810 m	MPC · JPL
433348	2013 RA_{68}	—	September 12, 2013	Mount Lemmon	Mount Lemmon Survey	·	1.8 km	MPC · JPL
433349	2013 RO_{81}	—	August 27, 2009	Kitt Peak	Spacewatch	·	1.3 km	MPC · JPL
433350	2013 RY_{82}	—	December 18, 2001	Socorro	LINEAR	·	1.2 km	MPC · JPL
433351	2013 RD_{83}	—	November 10, 1999	Kitt Peak	Spacewatch	DOR	1.9 km	MPC · JPL
433352	2013 RU_{84}	—	August 19, 2006	Kitt Peak	Spacewatch	·	650 m	MPC · JPL
433353	2013 RZ_{84}	—	October 19, 2006	Catalina	CSS	·	910 m	MPC · JPL
433354	2013 RL_{90}	—	September 21, 2009	Kitt Peak	Spacewatch	·	930 m	MPC · JPL
433355	2013 RY_{91}	—	December 27, 2006	Mount Lemmon	Mount Lemmon Survey	NYS	1.0 km	MPC · JPL
433356	2013 RJ_{93}	—	August 21, 2006	Kitt Peak	Spacewatch	·	620 m	MPC · JPL
433357	2013 RM_{93}	—	October 18, 2009	Catalina	CSS	·	1.5 km	MPC · JPL
433358	2013 RY_{93}	—	January 27, 2007	Mount Lemmon	Mount Lemmon Survey	NYS	1.1 km	MPC · JPL
433359	2013 RU_{94}	—	June 30, 2008	Kitt Peak	Spacewatch	·	2.1 km	MPC · JPL
433360	2013 RW_{96}	—	October 15, 2001	Socorro	LINEAR	EUN	1.1 km	MPC · JPL
433361	2013 SD_{14}	—	September 17, 2004	Kitt Peak	Spacewatch	GEF	930 m	MPC · JPL
433362	2013 ST_{22}	—	November 9, 2009	Catalina	CSS	ADE	2.2 km	MPC · JPL
433363	2013 SN_{25}	—	August 3, 2000	Kitt Peak	Spacewatch	·	1.4 km	MPC · JPL
433364	2013 SW_{26}	—	November 15, 2010	Mount Lemmon	Mount Lemmon Survey	·	710 m	MPC · JPL
433365	2013 SJ_{35}	—	December 15, 2006	Kitt Peak	Spacewatch	MAS	630 m	MPC · JPL
433366	2013 SE_{36}	—	February 25, 2011	Mount Lemmon	Mount Lemmon Survey	·	2.5 km	MPC · JPL
433367	2013 SS_{37}	—	December 15, 2006	Kitt Peak	Spacewatch	NYS	1.1 km	MPC · JPL
433368	2013 SU_{39}	—	August 9, 2007	Kitt Peak	Spacewatch	·	2.9 km	MPC · JPL
433369	2013 SU_{42}	—	November 19, 2008	Kitt Peak	Spacewatch	·	2.7 km	MPC · JPL
433370	2013 SL_{44}	—	January 23, 2006	Kitt Peak	Spacewatch	(1547)	1.4 km	MPC · JPL
433371	2013 SC_{49}	—	September 10, 2004	Socorro	LINEAR	·	1.9 km	MPC · JPL
433372	2013 SZ_{49}	—	May 29, 2012	Mount Lemmon	Mount Lemmon Survey	·	1.5 km	MPC · JPL
433373	2013 SD_{50}	—	October 29, 2005	Kitt Peak	Spacewatch	·	950 m	MPC · JPL
433374	2013 SV_{50}	—	December 2, 2010	Mount Lemmon	Mount Lemmon Survey	·	600 m	MPC · JPL
433375	2013 SH_{51}	—	September 7, 2008	Catalina	CSS	·	2.0 km	MPC · JPL
433376	2013 SM_{51}	—	December 28, 2005	Mount Lemmon	Mount Lemmon Survey	·	1.4 km	MPC · JPL
433377	2013 SM_{55}	—	January 16, 2011	Mount Lemmon	Mount Lemmon Survey	·	2.0 km	MPC · JPL
433378	2013 SZ_{56}	—	February 19, 2012	Catalina	CSS	H	640 m	MPC · JPL
433379	2013 SV_{58}	—	April 5, 2011	Mount Lemmon	Mount Lemmon Survey	EUN	1.2 km	MPC · JPL
433380	2013 SR_{63}	—	October 18, 2006	Kitt Peak	Spacewatch	·	910 m	MPC · JPL
433381	2013 SB_{69}	—	October 17, 2010	Mount Lemmon	Mount Lemmon Survey	·	470 m	MPC · JPL
433382	2013 ST_{71}	—	October 16, 2003	Anderson Mesa	LONEOS	·	730 m	MPC · JPL
433383	2013 SA_{73}	—	January 29, 2011	Mount Lemmon	Mount Lemmon Survey	V	650 m	MPC · JPL
433384	2013 SJ_{73}	—	September 17, 2006	Anderson Mesa	LONEOS	·	830 m	MPC · JPL
433385	2013 SZ_{76}	—	January 27, 2007	Kitt Peak	Spacewatch	·	1.1 km	MPC · JPL
433386	2013 SQ_{80}	—	October 13, 2006	Kitt Peak	Spacewatch	·	880 m	MPC · JPL
433387	2013 SU_{80}	—	October 3, 1999	Kitt Peak	Spacewatch	·	730 m	MPC · JPL
433388	2013 SK_{81}	—	April 8, 2006	Kitt Peak	Spacewatch	BRA	1.4 km	MPC · JPL
433389	2013 SL_{81}	—	April 2, 2005	Mount Lemmon	Mount Lemmon Survey	·	650 m	MPC · JPL
433390	2013 TV_{2}	—	September 7, 2008	Mount Lemmon	Mount Lemmon Survey	·	1.9 km	MPC · JPL
433391	2013 TF_{5}	—	May 14, 2005	Mount Lemmon	Mount Lemmon Survey	H	420 m	MPC · JPL
433392	2013 TP_{7}	—	April 29, 2012	Mount Lemmon	Mount Lemmon Survey	·	2.0 km	MPC · JPL
433393	2013 TF_{9}	—	September 12, 2007	Catalina	CSS	LIX	3.2 km	MPC · JPL
433394	2013 TU_{9}	—	August 23, 2004	Kitt Peak	Spacewatch	·	1.5 km	MPC · JPL
433395	2013 TK_{11}	—	November 18, 2009	Catalina	CSS	·	1.6 km	MPC · JPL
433396	2013 TP_{14}	—	September 30, 2000	Kitt Peak	Spacewatch	·	1.5 km	MPC · JPL
433397	2013 TM_{17}	—	September 10, 2007	Kitt Peak	Spacewatch	·	3.2 km	MPC · JPL
433398	2013 TL_{18}	—	October 18, 2003	Kitt Peak	Spacewatch	·	660 m	MPC · JPL
433399	2013 TQ_{19}	—	September 20, 2009	Kitt Peak	Spacewatch	·	810 m	MPC · JPL
433400	2013 TW_{22}	—	September 16, 2003	Kitt Peak	Spacewatch	KOR	1.2 km	MPC · JPL

== 433401–433500 ==
back to top

Designation			Discovery			Properties		Ref
Permanent	Provisional	Named after	Date	Site	Discoverer(s)	Category	Diam.	Ref
433401	2013 TU_{23}	—	November 3, 2005	Mount Lemmon	Mount Lemmon Survey	·	990 m	MPC · JPL
433402	2013 TV_{26}	—	December 2, 2005	Mount Lemmon	Mount Lemmon Survey	·	830 m	MPC · JPL
433403	2013 TP_{28}	—	March 30, 2011	Mount Lemmon	Mount Lemmon Survey	·	1.2 km	MPC · JPL
433404	2013 TT_{29}	—	September 28, 2003	Kitt Peak	Spacewatch	·	590 m	MPC · JPL
433405	2013 TB_{33}	—	April 21, 2009	Kitt Peak	Spacewatch	·	590 m	MPC · JPL
433406	2013 TV_{33}	—	October 9, 2004	Kitt Peak	Spacewatch	MRX	960 m	MPC · JPL
433407	2013 TZ_{36}	—	December 11, 1998	Kitt Peak	Spacewatch	·	1.1 km	MPC · JPL
433408	2013 TD_{39}	—	March 26, 2007	Kitt Peak	Spacewatch	·	1.7 km	MPC · JPL
433409	2013 TS_{41}	—	March 14, 2005	Mount Lemmon	Mount Lemmon Survey	·	2.8 km	MPC · JPL
433410	2013 TB_{42}	—	May 10, 2005	Kitt Peak	Spacewatch	·	3.4 km	MPC · JPL
433411	2013 TF_{43}	—	April 2, 2000	Kitt Peak	Spacewatch	·	1.2 km	MPC · JPL
433412	2013 TJ_{45}	—	November 11, 2010	Mount Lemmon	Mount Lemmon Survey	·	760 m	MPC · JPL
433413	2013 TV_{46}	—	February 12, 2008	Mount Lemmon	Mount Lemmon Survey	·	600 m	MPC · JPL
433414	2013 TW_{48}	—	April 14, 2008	Mount Lemmon	Mount Lemmon Survey	·	1.0 km	MPC · JPL
433415	2013 TJ_{50}	—	October 17, 1995	Kitt Peak	Spacewatch	·	1.6 km	MPC · JPL
433416	2013 TC_{51}	—	August 18, 2009	Kitt Peak	Spacewatch	·	1.4 km	MPC · JPL
433417	2013 TM_{53}	—	October 19, 2006	Mount Lemmon	Mount Lemmon Survey	·	1.2 km	MPC · JPL
433418	2013 TW_{54}	—	August 27, 2009	Catalina	CSS	·	1.2 km	MPC · JPL
433419	2013 TO_{63}	—	August 25, 2000	Kitt Peak	Spacewatch	·	670 m	MPC · JPL
433420	2013 TS_{66}	—	September 3, 2013	Kitt Peak	Spacewatch	·	1.3 km	MPC · JPL
433421	2013 TM_{68}	—	December 21, 2008	Mount Lemmon	Mount Lemmon Survey	·	2.0 km	MPC · JPL
433422	2013 TG_{70}	—	September 18, 2006	Kitt Peak	Spacewatch	·	700 m	MPC · JPL
433423	2013 TH_{71}	—	March 15, 2004	Kitt Peak	Spacewatch	V	610 m	MPC · JPL
433424	2013 TK_{75}	—	October 7, 2004	Kitt Peak	Spacewatch	·	1.5 km	MPC · JPL
433425	2013 TO_{81}	—	July 21, 2006	Mount Lemmon	Mount Lemmon Survey	·	960 m	MPC · JPL
433426	2013 TG_{84}	—	January 5, 2006	Catalina	CSS	·	1.4 km	MPC · JPL
433427	2013 TD_{86}	—	March 25, 2012	Kitt Peak	Spacewatch	·	520 m	MPC · JPL
433428	2013 TK_{90}	—	October 3, 2003	Kitt Peak	Spacewatch	·	760 m	MPC · JPL
433429	2013 TN_{91}	—	October 2, 1997	Kitt Peak	Spacewatch	·	520 m	MPC · JPL
433430	2013 TZ_{92}	—	October 29, 2008	Kitt Peak	Spacewatch	EOS	1.9 km	MPC · JPL
433431	2013 TX_{95}	—	September 9, 2004	Socorro	LINEAR	·	1.6 km	MPC · JPL
433432	2013 TJ_{97}	—	April 27, 2010	WISE	WISE	DOR	2.7 km	MPC · JPL
433433	2013 TG_{99}	—	October 2, 2013	Kitt Peak	Spacewatch	·	3.0 km	MPC · JPL
433434	2013 TO_{104}	—	February 23, 2007	Mount Lemmon	Mount Lemmon Survey	NYS	1.1 km	MPC · JPL
433435	2013 TE_{111}	—	September 6, 2004	Siding Spring	SSS	·	1.4 km	MPC · JPL
433436	2013 TE_{112}	—	October 24, 2003	Kitt Peak	Spacewatch	·	730 m	MPC · JPL
433437	2013 TF_{118}	—	November 19, 2009	Catalina	CSS	·	1.8 km	MPC · JPL
433438	2013 TJ_{121}	—	March 30, 2012	Kitt Peak	Spacewatch	·	1.2 km	MPC · JPL
433439	2013 TW_{124}	—	December 10, 2004	Kitt Peak	Spacewatch	·	1.6 km	MPC · JPL
433440	2013 TB_{125}	—	February 15, 2010	Kitt Peak	Spacewatch	EOS	1.9 km	MPC · JPL
433441	2013 TQ_{129}	—	October 30, 2009	Mount Lemmon	Mount Lemmon Survey	·	2.1 km	MPC · JPL
433442	2013 TC_{132}	—	September 6, 2013	Mount Lemmon	Mount Lemmon Survey	·	2.2 km	MPC · JPL
433443	2013 TY_{132}	—	October 15, 2006	Kitt Peak	Spacewatch	·	730 m	MPC · JPL
433444	2013 TF_{133}	—	March 31, 2008	Mount Lemmon	Mount Lemmon Survey	V	730 m	MPC · JPL
433445	2013 TQ_{133}	—	November 27, 2006	Mount Lemmon	Mount Lemmon Survey	MAS	720 m	MPC · JPL
433446	2013 TW_{136}	—	March 12, 2005	Mount Lemmon	Mount Lemmon Survey	·	3.9 km	MPC · JPL
433447	2013 TY_{136}	—	March 11, 2007	Kitt Peak	Spacewatch	·	1.3 km	MPC · JPL
433448	2013 TU_{142}	—	March 21, 2010	Kitt Peak	Spacewatch	·	2.8 km	MPC · JPL
433449	2013 TK_{145}	—	November 9, 2009	Kitt Peak	Spacewatch	·	1.8 km	MPC · JPL
433450	2013 TN_{156}	—	September 18, 2007	Kitt Peak	Spacewatch	·	3.1 km	MPC · JPL
433451	2013 TT_{156}	—	December 1, 2006	Mount Lemmon	Mount Lemmon Survey	·	1.1 km	MPC · JPL
433452	2013 UX_{5}	—	March 30, 2011	Mount Lemmon	Mount Lemmon Survey	·	1.6 km	MPC · JPL
433453	2013 UG_{6}	—	February 25, 2011	Mount Lemmon	Mount Lemmon Survey	·	1.5 km	MPC · JPL
433454	2013 UK_{6}	—	November 1, 2007	Mount Lemmon	Mount Lemmon Survey	·	3.0 km	MPC · JPL
433455	2013 UP_{7}	—	October 16, 2007	Mount Lemmon	Mount Lemmon Survey	·	3.0 km	MPC · JPL
433456	2013 UX_{10}	—	October 30, 2008	Kitt Peak	Spacewatch	EOS	2.0 km	MPC · JPL
433457	2013 UG_{11}	—	December 18, 2009	Mount Lemmon	Mount Lemmon Survey	·	2.2 km	MPC · JPL
433458	2013 UC_{12}	—	October 25, 2000	Socorro	LINEAR	·	1.8 km	MPC · JPL
433459	2013 UE_{12}	—	March 13, 2007	Mount Lemmon	Mount Lemmon Survey	·	2.0 km	MPC · JPL
433460	2013 VG_{1}	—	November 8, 2009	Catalina	CSS	·	1.5 km	MPC · JPL
433461	2013 VR_{2}	—	December 5, 2002	Socorro	LINEAR	·	1.4 km	MPC · JPL
433462	2013 VE_{3}	—	December 31, 2008	Kitt Peak	Spacewatch	·	2.3 km	MPC · JPL
433463	2013 VA_{5}	—	June 21, 2010	Mount Lemmon	Mount Lemmon Survey	H	450 m	MPC · JPL
433464	2013 VL_{6}	—	October 25, 2008	Kitt Peak	Spacewatch	·	1.9 km	MPC · JPL
433465	2013 VH_{8}	—	January 15, 2008	Kitt Peak	Spacewatch	·	930 m	MPC · JPL
433466	2013 VO_{8}	—	May 9, 2011	Mount Lemmon	Mount Lemmon Survey	·	3.0 km	MPC · JPL
433467	2013 VP_{8}	—	September 2, 2008	Kitt Peak	Spacewatch	·	1.6 km	MPC · JPL
433468	2013 VR_{9}	—	April 18, 2010	WISE	WISE	·	1.3 km	MPC · JPL
433469	2013 VE_{10}	—	December 30, 2005	Kitt Peak	Spacewatch	·	1.4 km	MPC · JPL
433470	2013 VD_{11}	—	September 14, 2007	Kitt Peak	Spacewatch	·	4.0 km	MPC · JPL
433471	2013 VD_{15}	—	October 14, 2009	Mount Lemmon	Mount Lemmon Survey	·	1.5 km	MPC · JPL
433472	2013 VV_{15}	—	April 1, 2011	Mount Lemmon	Mount Lemmon Survey	BRG	1.6 km	MPC · JPL
433473	2013 VJ_{19}	—	November 26, 2003	Kitt Peak	Spacewatch	·	750 m	MPC · JPL
433474	2013 VN_{19}	—	November 24, 2006	Mount Lemmon	Mount Lemmon Survey	MAS	860 m	MPC · JPL
433475	2013 VY_{20}	—	January 18, 2009	Catalina	CSS	·	3.5 km	MPC · JPL
433476	2013 VR_{23}	—	October 10, 1996	Kitt Peak	Spacewatch	·	2.1 km	MPC · JPL
433477	2013 WK_{3}	—	December 19, 2007	Mount Lemmon	Mount Lemmon Survey	·	780 m	MPC · JPL
433478	2013 WK_{4}	—	November 4, 1999	Kitt Peak	Spacewatch	·	2.0 km	MPC · JPL
433479	2013 WN_{4}	—	October 14, 2013	Mount Lemmon	Mount Lemmon Survey	(5)	1.4 km	MPC · JPL
433480	2013 WO_{4}	—	October 14, 2013	Mount Lemmon	Mount Lemmon Survey	·	1.9 km	MPC · JPL
433481	2013 WA_{5}	—	December 10, 2004	Kitt Peak	Spacewatch	·	2.1 km	MPC · JPL
433482	2013 WF_{5}	—	July 26, 1995	Kitt Peak	Spacewatch	·	1.6 km	MPC · JPL
433483	2013 WV_{7}	—	January 30, 2006	Catalina	CSS	·	1.6 km	MPC · JPL
433484	2013 WW_{7}	—	September 9, 2007	Kitt Peak	Spacewatch	·	2.1 km	MPC · JPL
433485	2013 WJ_{8}	—	February 2, 2010	WISE	WISE	·	4.3 km	MPC · JPL
433486	2013 WZ_{10}	—	March 17, 2004	Kitt Peak	Spacewatch	·	1.1 km	MPC · JPL
433487	2013 WF_{12}	—	March 12, 2007	Kitt Peak	Spacewatch	·	1.5 km	MPC · JPL
433488	2013 WN_{12}	—	May 26, 2011	Mount Lemmon	Mount Lemmon Survey	·	2.2 km	MPC · JPL
433489	2013 WR_{15}	—	April 17, 1998	Kitt Peak	Spacewatch	·	1.9 km	MPC · JPL
433490	2013 WZ_{16}	—	November 16, 2006	Kitt Peak	Spacewatch	·	780 m	MPC · JPL
433491	2013 WL_{19}	—	December 6, 2010	Mount Lemmon	Mount Lemmon Survey	·	630 m	MPC · JPL
433492	2013 WX_{25}	—	October 9, 2008	Mount Lemmon	Mount Lemmon Survey	·	3.8 km	MPC · JPL
433493	2013 WT_{26}	—	October 9, 2007	Mount Lemmon	Mount Lemmon Survey	·	4.6 km	MPC · JPL
433494	2013 WO_{27}	—	March 18, 2004	Kitt Peak	Spacewatch	·	3.8 km	MPC · JPL
433495	2013 WA_{31}	—	October 10, 2007	Mount Lemmon	Mount Lemmon Survey	VER	2.9 km	MPC · JPL
433496	2013 WK_{33}	—	August 30, 2005	Kitt Peak	Spacewatch	·	1.1 km	MPC · JPL
433497	2013 WA_{36}	—	January 27, 2006	Kitt Peak	Spacewatch	·	1.6 km	MPC · JPL
433498	2013 WG_{37}	—	October 26, 2008	Kitt Peak	Spacewatch	·	2.1 km	MPC · JPL
433499	2013 WF_{40}	—	October 31, 2008	Catalina	CSS	BRA	1.8 km	MPC · JPL
433500	2013 WF_{41}	—	April 7, 2006	Kitt Peak	Spacewatch	·	2.0 km	MPC · JPL

== 433501–433600 ==
back to top

Designation			Discovery			Properties		Ref
Permanent	Provisional	Named after	Date	Site	Discoverer(s)	Category	Diam.	Ref
433501	2013 WN_{41}	—	March 29, 2011	Kitt Peak	Spacewatch	EUN	1.2 km	MPC · JPL
433502	2013 WX_{45}	—	January 23, 2006	Catalina	CSS	·	1.8 km	MPC · JPL
433503	2013 WP_{46}	—	April 6, 2008	Mount Lemmon	Mount Lemmon Survey	PHO	1.0 km	MPC · JPL
433504	2013 WH_{47}	—	October 31, 2005	Mauna Kea	A. Boattini	·	1.9 km	MPC · JPL
433505	2013 WK_{47}	—	October 27, 2013	Kitt Peak	Spacewatch	·	1.8 km	MPC · JPL
433506	2013 WS_{47}	—	September 4, 2000	Anderson Mesa	LONEOS	·	680 m	MPC · JPL
433507	2013 WQ_{50}	—	April 1, 2011	Mount Lemmon	Mount Lemmon Survey	·	1.2 km	MPC · JPL
433508	2013 WN_{51}	—	July 18, 2012	Catalina	CSS	EOS	2.5 km	MPC · JPL
433509	2013 WE_{54}	—	January 19, 2004	Kitt Peak	Spacewatch	·	2.3 km	MPC · JPL
433510	2013 WV_{54}	—	October 11, 2007	Catalina	CSS	·	4.3 km	MPC · JPL
433511	2013 WD_{55}	—	February 10, 1997	Kitt Peak	Spacewatch	·	1.9 km	MPC · JPL
433512 Hollyholman	2013 WE_{55}	Hollyholman	November 26, 2009	Mount Lemmon	Mount Lemmon Survey	(5)	1.8 km	MPC · JPL
433513	2013 WY_{55}	—	May 19, 2012	Mount Lemmon	Mount Lemmon Survey	·	2.2 km	MPC · JPL
433514	2013 WS_{58}	—	November 22, 2006	Mount Lemmon	Mount Lemmon Survey	·	1.7 km	MPC · JPL
433515	2013 WP_{59}	—	October 4, 2000	Kitt Peak	Spacewatch	·	1.4 km	MPC · JPL
433516	2013 WR_{62}	—	June 8, 2005	Kitt Peak	Spacewatch	·	840 m	MPC · JPL
433517	2013 WD_{68}	—	November 20, 2009	Mount Lemmon	Mount Lemmon Survey	·	1.9 km	MPC · JPL
433518	2013 WM_{68}	—	November 11, 2009	Kitt Peak	Spacewatch	(5)	1.2 km	MPC · JPL
433519	2013 WU_{69}	—	May 30, 2011	Haleakala	Pan-STARRS 1	EOS	2.6 km	MPC · JPL
433520	2013 WE_{70}	—	October 24, 2004	Kitt Peak	Spacewatch	·	1.7 km	MPC · JPL
433521	2013 WM_{72}	—	November 9, 2009	Mount Lemmon	Mount Lemmon Survey	EUN	960 m	MPC · JPL
433522	2013 WY_{75}	—	October 26, 2013	Mount Lemmon	Mount Lemmon Survey	·	1.7 km	MPC · JPL
433523	2013 WE_{76}	—	May 14, 2008	Mount Lemmon	Mount Lemmon Survey	·	1.2 km	MPC · JPL
433524	2013 WP_{76}	—	December 18, 2003	Kitt Peak	Spacewatch	·	1.5 km	MPC · JPL
433525	2013 WH_{78}	—	September 19, 2009	Catalina	CSS	·	1.3 km	MPC · JPL
433526	2013 WX_{79}	—	September 10, 2007	Kitt Peak	Spacewatch	·	2.3 km	MPC · JPL
433527	2013 WX_{80}	—	November 8, 2013	Catalina	CSS	·	3.3 km	MPC · JPL
433528	2013 WS_{81}	—	May 25, 2007	Mount Lemmon	Mount Lemmon Survey	·	1.9 km	MPC · JPL
433529	2013 WV_{82}	—	December 2, 2004	Kitt Peak	Spacewatch	GEF	1.0 km	MPC · JPL
433530	2013 WG_{83}	—	September 23, 2008	Kitt Peak	Spacewatch	·	1.9 km	MPC · JPL
433531	2013 WA_{84}	—	November 3, 2008	Mount Lemmon	Mount Lemmon Survey	·	2.2 km	MPC · JPL
433532	2013 WZ_{85}	—	December 25, 2009	Kitt Peak	Spacewatch	·	1.5 km	MPC · JPL
433533	2013 WD_{86}	—	May 22, 2011	Mount Lemmon	Mount Lemmon Survey	·	2.1 km	MPC · JPL
433534	2013 WQ_{87}	—	July 13, 2004	Siding Spring	SSS	·	1.9 km	MPC · JPL
433535	2013 WL_{91}	—	September 27, 2000	Socorro	LINEAR	·	1.6 km	MPC · JPL
433536	2013 WX_{92}	—	October 7, 2004	Kitt Peak	Spacewatch	WIT	1.3 km	MPC · JPL
433537	2013 WH_{95}	—	October 6, 2000	Kitt Peak	Spacewatch	·	1.7 km	MPC · JPL
433538	2013 WS_{97}	—	January 29, 2011	Kitt Peak	Spacewatch	MAR	1.6 km	MPC · JPL
433539	2013 WE_{98}	—	August 24, 2001	Anderson Mesa	LONEOS	·	3.3 km	MPC · JPL
433540	2013 WN_{98}	—	January 19, 2005	Kitt Peak	Spacewatch	·	2.9 km	MPC · JPL
433541	2013 WJ_{105}	—	October 29, 2008	Mount Lemmon	Mount Lemmon Survey	·	3.8 km	MPC · JPL
433542	2013 WT_{105}	—	July 28, 2006	Siding Spring	SSS	CYB	5.4 km	MPC · JPL
433543	2013 WU_{105}	—	October 4, 2013	Kitt Peak	Spacewatch	·	1.2 km	MPC · JPL
433544	2013 WO_{106}	—	January 2, 2006	Catalina	CSS	·	1.7 km	MPC · JPL
433545	2013 WW_{106}	—	January 25, 2006	Catalina	CSS	·	1.6 km	MPC · JPL
433546	2013 WJ_{109}	—	March 13, 2007	Mount Lemmon	Mount Lemmon Survey	·	1.7 km	MPC · JPL
433547	2013 WR_{109}	—	May 25, 2006	Kitt Peak	Spacewatch	·	2.5 km	MPC · JPL
433548	2013 XJ	—	August 26, 2009	Catalina	CSS	NYS	1.1 km	MPC · JPL
433549	2013 XU_{4}	—	January 1, 2009	Mount Lemmon	Mount Lemmon Survey	·	3.2 km	MPC · JPL
433550	2013 XX_{4}	—	October 2, 2008	Mount Lemmon	Mount Lemmon Survey	·	2.1 km	MPC · JPL
433551	2013 XA_{5}	—	July 25, 2008	Siding Spring	SSS	·	2.4 km	MPC · JPL
433552	2013 XB_{8}	—	September 21, 2008	Mount Lemmon	Mount Lemmon Survey	·	2.3 km	MPC · JPL
433553	2013 XT_{9}	—	January 14, 2002	Socorro	LINEAR	·	1.6 km	MPC · JPL
433554	2013 XB_{11}	—	November 21, 1998	Kitt Peak	Spacewatch	PHO	990 m	MPC · JPL
433555	2013 XF_{11}	—	January 18, 2010	WISE	WISE	·	3.6 km	MPC · JPL
433556	2013 XJ_{11}	—	December 9, 2006	Kitt Peak	Spacewatch	·	1.0 km	MPC · JPL
433557	2013 XX_{11}	—	September 24, 2008	Mount Lemmon	Mount Lemmon Survey	·	1.9 km	MPC · JPL
433558	2013 XE_{19}	—	April 19, 2007	Mount Lemmon	Mount Lemmon Survey	·	2.2 km	MPC · JPL
433559	2013 XN_{19}	—	October 9, 2004	Kitt Peak	Spacewatch	ADE	2.1 km	MPC · JPL
433560	2013 XM_{20}	—	March 13, 2011	Mount Lemmon	Mount Lemmon Survey	·	1.3 km	MPC · JPL
433561	2013 XH_{25}	—	January 17, 2007	Kitt Peak	Spacewatch	NYS	1.3 km	MPC · JPL
433562	2013 YJ	—	May 11, 2007	Kitt Peak	Spacewatch	·	2.6 km	MPC · JPL
433563	2013 YM_{3}	—	December 30, 2008	Catalina	CSS	·	3.3 km	MPC · JPL
433564	2013 YM_{5}	—	January 11, 2008	Kitt Peak	Spacewatch	CYB	3.1 km	MPC · JPL
433565	2013 YP_{8}	—	December 18, 2004	Mount Lemmon	Mount Lemmon Survey	MRX	1.1 km	MPC · JPL
433566	2013 YZ_{8}	—	April 10, 2010	Mount Lemmon	Mount Lemmon Survey	·	3.8 km	MPC · JPL
433567	2013 YH_{15}	—	January 13, 2010	WISE	WISE	·	5.1 km	MPC · JPL
433568	2013 YK_{17}	—	June 15, 2005	Mount Lemmon	Mount Lemmon Survey	·	3.3 km	MPC · JPL
433569	2013 YP_{19}	—	November 9, 2008	Mount Lemmon	Mount Lemmon Survey	·	3.2 km	MPC · JPL
433570	2013 YR_{22}	—	October 7, 2004	Kitt Peak	Spacewatch	·	1.3 km	MPC · JPL
433571	2013 YC_{23}	—	October 11, 2012	Mount Lemmon	Mount Lemmon Survey	·	2.3 km	MPC · JPL
433572	2013 YD_{23}	—	September 12, 2007	Mount Lemmon	Mount Lemmon Survey	·	1.9 km	MPC · JPL
433573	2013 YM_{27}	—	March 3, 2009	Kitt Peak	Spacewatch	THM	2.1 km	MPC · JPL
433574	2013 YC_{28}	—	January 1, 2008	Mount Lemmon	Mount Lemmon Survey	·	4.2 km	MPC · JPL
433575	2013 YY_{28}	—	April 20, 2010	Mount Lemmon	Mount Lemmon Survey	·	2.9 km	MPC · JPL
433576	2013 YC_{29}	—	September 14, 2005	Catalina	CSS	·	1.4 km	MPC · JPL
433577	2013 YG_{29}	—	December 19, 2007	Mount Lemmon	Mount Lemmon Survey	·	3.7 km	MPC · JPL
433578	2013 YQ_{29}	—	December 18, 2001	Socorro	LINEAR	·	1.3 km	MPC · JPL
433579	2013 YD_{31}	—	November 21, 2008	Mount Lemmon	Mount Lemmon Survey	·	3.1 km	MPC · JPL
433580	2013 YP_{31}	—	April 15, 2010	Kitt Peak	Spacewatch	EOS	2.3 km	MPC · JPL
433581	2013 YW_{32}	—	April 2, 2005	Kitt Peak	Spacewatch	·	2.1 km	MPC · JPL
433582	2013 YV_{34}	—	May 14, 2008	Mount Lemmon	Mount Lemmon Survey	·	1.3 km	MPC · JPL
433583	2013 YU_{35}	—	January 4, 2003	Socorro	LINEAR	·	3.1 km	MPC · JPL
433584	2013 YZ_{35}	—	April 11, 2010	WISE	WISE	·	2.1 km	MPC · JPL
433585	2013 YH_{39}	—	December 13, 1999	Kitt Peak	Spacewatch	·	1.0 km	MPC · JPL
433586	2013 YW_{40}	—	July 3, 2005	Siding Spring	SSS	PHO	1.4 km	MPC · JPL
433587	2013 YL_{41}	—	January 31, 2006	Kitt Peak	Spacewatch	·	1.2 km	MPC · JPL
433588	2013 YQ_{41}	—	April 28, 2004	Kitt Peak	Spacewatch	·	1.7 km	MPC · JPL
433589	2013 YP_{44}	—	December 26, 2013	Kitt Peak	Spacewatch	EOS	1.9 km	MPC · JPL
433590	2013 YT_{45}	—	May 20, 2006	Kitt Peak	Spacewatch	·	2.0 km	MPC · JPL
433591	2013 YQ_{47}	—	February 4, 2009	Mount Lemmon	Mount Lemmon Survey	·	3.2 km	MPC · JPL
433592	2013 YG_{51}	—	September 20, 2009	Mount Lemmon	Mount Lemmon Survey	·	1.3 km	MPC · JPL
433593	2013 YQ_{51}	—	January 1, 2009	Mount Lemmon	Mount Lemmon Survey	·	2.9 km	MPC · JPL
433594	2013 YO_{56}	—	October 20, 2007	Mount Lemmon	Mount Lemmon Survey	EOS	2.1 km	MPC · JPL
433595	2013 YP_{56}	—	January 1, 2009	Mount Lemmon	Mount Lemmon Survey	·	1.9 km	MPC · JPL
433596	2013 YW_{57}	—	April 11, 2011	Mount Lemmon	Mount Lemmon Survey	EUN	1.4 km	MPC · JPL
433597	2013 YA_{59}	—	December 12, 2004	Kitt Peak	Spacewatch	·	2.2 km	MPC · JPL
433598	2013 YG_{60}	—	May 6, 2006	Kitt Peak	Spacewatch	·	2.3 km	MPC · JPL
433599	2013 YY_{61}	—	September 22, 2003	Kitt Peak	Spacewatch	·	2.4 km	MPC · JPL
433600	2013 YK_{62}	—	February 24, 2009	Mount Lemmon	Mount Lemmon Survey	·	3.4 km	MPC · JPL

== 433601–433700 ==
back to top

Designation			Discovery			Properties		Ref
Permanent	Provisional	Named after	Date	Site	Discoverer(s)	Category	Diam.	Ref
433601	2013 YK_{63}	—	November 20, 2001	Socorro	LINEAR	MAS	890 m	MPC · JPL
433602	2013 YE_{66}	—	December 16, 1993	Kitt Peak	Spacewatch	·	2.5 km	MPC · JPL
433603	2013 YG_{70}	—	February 19, 2009	Catalina	CSS	·	3.6 km	MPC · JPL
433604	2013 YX_{71}	—	November 21, 2008	Kitt Peak	Spacewatch	·	2.2 km	MPC · JPL
433605	2013 YX_{72}	—	March 9, 2005	Catalina	CSS	·	2.5 km	MPC · JPL
433606	2013 YO_{78}	—	January 17, 2009	Kitt Peak	Spacewatch	EOS	2.1 km	MPC · JPL
433607	2013 YW_{78}	—	October 20, 2003	Kitt Peak	Spacewatch	·	2.2 km	MPC · JPL
433608	2013 YG_{81}	—	December 12, 2004	Kitt Peak	Spacewatch	·	2.0 km	MPC · JPL
433609	2013 YN_{86}	—	August 23, 2008	Siding Spring	SSS	·	1.7 km	MPC · JPL
433610	2013 YQ_{89}	—	December 17, 2001	Socorro	LINEAR	·	1.4 km	MPC · JPL
433611	2013 YV_{92}	—	October 22, 2005	Kitt Peak	Spacewatch	3:2 · SHU	4.3 km	MPC · JPL
433612	2013 YU_{94}	—	December 10, 2009	Mount Lemmon	Mount Lemmon Survey	V	800 m	MPC · JPL
433613	2013 YV_{94}	—	April 13, 2004	Kitt Peak	Spacewatch	THM	2.0 km	MPC · JPL
433614	2013 YG_{98}	—	March 16, 2005	Mount Lemmon	Mount Lemmon Survey	KOR	1.4 km	MPC · JPL
433615	2013 YA_{101}	—	October 22, 2012	Kitt Peak	Spacewatch	3:2	4.7 km	MPC · JPL
433616	2013 YZ_{103}	—	November 4, 2013	Kitt Peak	Spacewatch	·	1.9 km	MPC · JPL
433617	2013 YQ_{107}	—	March 27, 2012	Kitt Peak	Spacewatch	·	1.3 km	MPC · JPL
433618	2013 YK_{108}	—	December 18, 2009	Mount Lemmon	Mount Lemmon Survey	·	1.4 km	MPC · JPL
433619	2013 YW_{108}	—	January 13, 2005	Kitt Peak	Spacewatch	·	1.7 km	MPC · JPL
433620	2013 YY_{109}	—	June 3, 2011	Mount Lemmon	Mount Lemmon Survey	·	2.7 km	MPC · JPL
433621	2013 YY_{110}	—	October 6, 2012	Catalina	CSS	·	2.4 km	MPC · JPL
433622	2013 YY_{111}	—	January 16, 2000	Kitt Peak	Spacewatch	AGN	1.3 km	MPC · JPL
433623	2013 YG_{115}	—	January 19, 2009	Mount Lemmon	Mount Lemmon Survey	·	2.4 km	MPC · JPL
433624	2013 YG_{116}	—	July 4, 2005	Mount Lemmon	Mount Lemmon Survey	·	2.6 km	MPC · JPL
433625	2013 YB_{119}	—	October 17, 2012	Mount Lemmon	Mount Lemmon Survey	·	2.7 km	MPC · JPL
433626	2013 YR_{119}	—	October 9, 2008	Catalina	CSS	·	1.8 km	MPC · JPL
433627	2013 YS_{120}	—	January 31, 2009	Kitt Peak	Spacewatch	·	2.5 km	MPC · JPL
433628	2013 YH_{127}	—	September 8, 2008	Siding Spring	SSS	EUN	1.3 km	MPC · JPL
433629	2013 YJ_{130}	—	April 24, 2001	Kitt Peak	Spacewatch	·	1.0 km	MPC · JPL
433630	2013 YW_{132}	—	October 31, 2007	Mount Lemmon	Mount Lemmon Survey	EOS	1.8 km	MPC · JPL
433631	2013 YP_{133}	—	May 9, 2010	Mount Lemmon	Mount Lemmon Survey	·	3.2 km	MPC · JPL
433632	2013 YZ_{133}	—	October 10, 2007	Mount Lemmon	Mount Lemmon Survey	·	3.1 km	MPC · JPL
433633	2013 YE_{138}	—	November 3, 2007	Kitt Peak	Spacewatch	·	4.2 km	MPC · JPL
433634	2014 AA_{2}	—	October 15, 2007	Mount Lemmon	Mount Lemmon Survey	EOS	1.7 km	MPC · JPL
433635	2014 AD_{2}	—	April 9, 2010	Mount Lemmon	Mount Lemmon Survey	·	4.1 km	MPC · JPL
433636	2014 AE_{9}	—	September 25, 2006	Anderson Mesa	LONEOS	HYG	3.5 km	MPC · JPL
433637	2014 AA_{11}	—	October 2, 2008	Catalina	CSS	·	2.0 km	MPC · JPL
433638	2014 AG_{18}	—	September 13, 2007	Mount Lemmon	Mount Lemmon Survey	KOR	1.5 km	MPC · JPL
433639	2014 AG_{19}	—	December 20, 2004	Mount Lemmon	Mount Lemmon Survey	·	1.7 km	MPC · JPL
433640	2014 AO_{22}	—	December 20, 2004	Mount Lemmon	Mount Lemmon Survey	·	2.0 km	MPC · JPL
433641	2014 AZ_{22}	—	December 7, 2002	Kitt Peak	Spacewatch	·	3.2 km	MPC · JPL
433642	2014 AE_{35}	—	December 26, 2009	Kitt Peak	Spacewatch	·	1.9 km	MPC · JPL
433643	2014 AR_{36}	—	August 31, 2000	Socorro	LINEAR	·	1.0 km	MPC · JPL
433644	2014 AZ_{36}	—	August 7, 2008	Kitt Peak	Spacewatch	·	1.6 km	MPC · JPL
433645	2014 AD_{37}	—	October 7, 2008	Mount Lemmon	Mount Lemmon Survey	·	2.0 km	MPC · JPL
433646	2014 AJ_{37}	—	June 13, 2007	Kitt Peak	Spacewatch	EUN	1.6 km	MPC · JPL
433647	2014 AL_{37}	—	April 27, 2011	Mount Lemmon	Mount Lemmon Survey	·	4.4 km	MPC · JPL
433648	2014 AO_{41}	—	February 4, 2009	Mount Lemmon	Mount Lemmon Survey	·	2.6 km	MPC · JPL
433649	2014 AZ_{42}	—	January 31, 2009	Mount Lemmon	Mount Lemmon Survey	EOS	2.0 km	MPC · JPL
433650	2014 AX_{44}	—	November 21, 2007	Mount Lemmon	Mount Lemmon Survey	·	3.1 km	MPC · JPL
433651	2014 AG_{47}	—	February 10, 2010	Kitt Peak	Spacewatch	·	2.4 km	MPC · JPL
433652	2014 BX	—	February 16, 2007	Catalina	CSS	·	1.6 km	MPC · JPL
433653	2014 BH_{4}	—	November 27, 1998	Kitt Peak	Spacewatch	KOR	1.6 km	MPC · JPL
433654	2014 BN_{11}	—	November 20, 2007	Catalina	CSS	EOS	2.2 km	MPC · JPL
433655	2014 BW_{14}	—	September 21, 2001	Kitt Peak	Spacewatch	·	2.4 km	MPC · JPL
433656	2014 BL_{17}	—	October 8, 2004	Kitt Peak	Spacewatch	·	1.1 km	MPC · JPL
433657	2014 BA_{23}	—	June 11, 2005	Kitt Peak	Spacewatch	·	1.9 km	MPC · JPL
433658	2014 BO_{26}	—	December 24, 2005	Kitt Peak	Spacewatch	3:2	4.1 km	MPC · JPL
433659	2014 BG_{27}	—	January 20, 2009	Kitt Peak	Spacewatch	LIX	3.8 km	MPC · JPL
433660	2014 BL_{28}	—	June 17, 2010	WISE	WISE	·	3.2 km	MPC · JPL
433661	2014 BO_{28}	—	February 27, 2006	Kitt Peak	Spacewatch	·	1.7 km	MPC · JPL
433662	2014 BP_{46}	—	January 1, 2008	Kitt Peak	Spacewatch	·	3.9 km	MPC · JPL
433663	2014 CW_{10}	—	December 17, 2001	Socorro	LINEAR	VER	3.9 km	MPC · JPL
433664	2014 CK_{16}	—	March 16, 2009	Kitt Peak	Spacewatch	·	2.8 km	MPC · JPL
433665	2014 CB_{22}	—	April 23, 2009	Catalina	CSS	·	4.2 km	MPC · JPL
433666	2014 DC_{8}	—	January 3, 2009	Mount Lemmon	Mount Lemmon Survey	·	2.5 km	MPC · JPL
433667	2014 DN_{18}	—	July 5, 2010	Mount Lemmon	Mount Lemmon Survey	·	4.4 km	MPC · JPL
433668	2014 DV_{23}	—	January 19, 2005	Kitt Peak	Spacewatch	·	2.4 km	MPC · JPL
433669	2014 DX_{29}	—	September 27, 2006	Kitt Peak	Spacewatch	·	3.1 km	MPC · JPL
433670	2014 DD_{32}	—	January 18, 2010	WISE	WISE	L4	10 km	MPC · JPL
433671	2014 DF_{32}	—	September 28, 2009	Mount Lemmon	Mount Lemmon Survey	L4 · (8060)	8.0 km	MPC · JPL
433672	2014 DK_{32}	—	October 19, 2010	Mount Lemmon	Mount Lemmon Survey	L4	7.9 km	MPC · JPL
433673	2014 DX_{82}	—	November 28, 2000	Kitt Peak	Spacewatch	·	4.0 km	MPC · JPL
433674	2014 DH_{124}	—	August 7, 2008	Kitt Peak	Spacewatch	L4	7.2 km	MPC · JPL
433675	2014 DK_{125}	—	January 17, 2010	WISE	WISE	L4	8.5 km	MPC · JPL
433676	2014 DP_{139}	—	September 25, 2009	Kitt Peak	Spacewatch	L4	7.8 km	MPC · JPL
433677	2014 EO_{7}	—	September 7, 2008	Mount Lemmon	Mount Lemmon Survey	L4	9.5 km	MPC · JPL
433678	2014 EW_{16}	—	September 25, 2000	Kitt Peak	Spacewatch	·	3.5 km	MPC · JPL
433679	2014 EY_{22}	—	April 8, 2003	Kitt Peak	Spacewatch	L4	7.2 km	MPC · JPL
433680	2014 EH_{29}	—	September 30, 2006	Mount Lemmon	Mount Lemmon Survey	·	3.1 km	MPC · JPL
433681	2014 EH_{33}	—	December 8, 2010	Kitt Peak	Spacewatch	L4	8.8 km	MPC · JPL
433682	2014 OU_{157}	—	March 18, 2007	Kitt Peak	Spacewatch	·	760 m	MPC · JPL
433683	2014 UF_{112}	—	January 30, 2004	Kitt Peak	Spacewatch	·	1.0 km	MPC · JPL
433684	2014 VP_{7}	—	September 13, 2004	Kitt Peak	Spacewatch	·	1.7 km	MPC · JPL
433685	2014 VF_{21}	—	October 29, 2000	Kitt Peak	Spacewatch	·	2.0 km	MPC · JPL
433686	2014 VL_{24}	—	November 16, 2006	Mount Lemmon	Mount Lemmon Survey	·	1.0 km	MPC · JPL
433687	2014 WN_{18}	—	October 7, 2005	Catalina	CSS	·	1.7 km	MPC · JPL
433688	2014 WB_{19}	—	December 19, 2003	Socorro	LINEAR	·	3.3 km	MPC · JPL
433689	2014 WH_{46}	—	September 19, 2003	Kitt Peak	Spacewatch	TEL	1.2 km	MPC · JPL
433690	2014 WS_{46}	—	November 30, 2003	Kitt Peak	Spacewatch	·	3.8 km	MPC · JPL
433691	2014 WJ_{52}	—	September 7, 2008	Mount Lemmon	Mount Lemmon Survey	·	2.1 km	MPC · JPL
433692	2014 WO_{55}	—	October 14, 2009	Mount Lemmon	Mount Lemmon Survey	·	2.6 km	MPC · JPL
433693	2014 WB_{140}	—	February 27, 2008	Kitt Peak	Spacewatch	NYS	1.2 km	MPC · JPL
433694	2014 WW_{179}	—	November 16, 2006	Mount Lemmon	Mount Lemmon Survey	·	2.3 km	MPC · JPL
433695	2014 WO_{252}	—	May 15, 2009	Kitt Peak	Spacewatch	·	1.5 km	MPC · JPL
433696	2014 WA_{311}	—	November 9, 2004	Catalina	CSS	·	660 m	MPC · JPL
433697	2014 WT_{399}	—	April 12, 2004	Socorro	LINEAR	T_{j} (2.98)	3.3 km	MPC · JPL
433698	2014 WZ_{423}	—	December 19, 2003	Socorro	LINEAR	·	3.7 km	MPC · JPL
433699	2014 WM_{428}	—	May 2, 2008	Kitt Peak	Spacewatch	V	890 m	MPC · JPL
433700	2014 WP_{467}	—	March 13, 2010	Catalina	CSS	·	2.9 km	MPC · JPL

== 433701–433800 ==
back to top

Designation			Discovery			Properties		Ref
Permanent	Provisional	Named after	Date	Site	Discoverer(s)	Category	Diam.	Ref
433701	2014 WX_{467}	—	September 23, 2008	Kitt Peak	Spacewatch	·	2.4 km	MPC · JPL
433702	2014 WE_{468}	—	February 11, 2004	Kitt Peak	Spacewatch	·	2.5 km	MPC · JPL
433703	2014 WG_{469}	—	November 9, 2008	Mount Lemmon	Mount Lemmon Survey	·	3.6 km	MPC · JPL
433704	2014 WP_{469}	—	February 3, 2001	Kitt Peak	Spacewatch	·	2.7 km	MPC · JPL
433705	2014 WE_{491}	—	March 9, 2010	WISE	WISE	·	3.5 km	MPC · JPL
433706	2014 WF_{495}	—	January 25, 2007	Catalina	CSS	3:2	4.6 km	MPC · JPL
433707	2014 WO_{496}	—	September 22, 2008	Mount Lemmon	Mount Lemmon Survey	·	2.5 km	MPC · JPL
433708	2014 XV_{20}	—	September 16, 2003	Kitt Peak	Spacewatch	·	3.2 km	MPC · JPL
433709	2014 XF_{37}	—	May 7, 2005	Kitt Peak	Spacewatch	·	3.4 km	MPC · JPL
433710	2014 XG_{37}	—	January 11, 2010	Kitt Peak	Spacewatch	EOS	2.9 km	MPC · JPL
433711	2014 XH_{37}	—	February 17, 2004	Kitt Peak	Spacewatch	·	1.5 km	MPC · JPL
433712	2014 XL_{37}	—	April 5, 2000	Socorro	LINEAR	NYS	1.4 km	MPC · JPL
433713	2014 XW_{37}	—	September 28, 2006	Catalina	CSS	·	1.4 km	MPC · JPL
433714	2014 XV_{38}	—	December 19, 2003	Socorro	LINEAR	·	2.2 km	MPC · JPL
433715	2014 YQ_{4}	—	October 6, 2008	Kitt Peak	Spacewatch	·	1.4 km	MPC · JPL
433716	2014 YQ_{7}	—	January 11, 1999	Kitt Peak	Spacewatch	·	3.1 km	MPC · JPL
433717	2014 YN_{8}	—	December 21, 2006	Kitt Peak	Spacewatch	H	620 m	MPC · JPL
433718	2014 YN_{11}	—	October 30, 2008	Catalina	CSS	·	3.3 km	MPC · JPL
433719	2014 YF_{20}	—	December 19, 2003	Kitt Peak	Spacewatch	EOS	2.4 km	MPC · JPL
433720	2014 YS_{21}	—	February 23, 1998	Kitt Peak	Spacewatch	·	2.2 km	MPC · JPL
433721	2014 YD_{23}	—	April 27, 2011	Mount Lemmon	Mount Lemmon Survey	·	3.9 km	MPC · JPL
433722	2014 YO_{32}	—	December 1, 1996	Kitt Peak	Spacewatch	·	4.5 km	MPC · JPL
433723	2015 AV_{3}	—	December 14, 2001	Socorro	LINEAR	·	1.8 km	MPC · JPL
433724	2015 AF_{13}	—	November 2, 2007	Mount Lemmon	Mount Lemmon Survey	·	3.5 km	MPC · JPL
433725	2015 AG_{32}	—	January 11, 2008	Kitt Peak	Spacewatch	·	1.2 km	MPC · JPL
433726	2015 AL_{32}	—	October 26, 2008	Kitt Peak	Spacewatch	LIX	3.7 km	MPC · JPL
433727	2015 AD_{43}	—	January 15, 2004	Kitt Peak	Spacewatch	·	3.1 km	MPC · JPL
433728	2015 AB_{77}	—	October 10, 2008	Mount Lemmon	Mount Lemmon Survey	·	2.0 km	MPC · JPL
433729	2015 AY_{118}	—	September 14, 2007	Kitt Peak	Spacewatch	HYG	3.1 km	MPC · JPL
433730	2015 AP_{132}	—	April 24, 2007	Kitt Peak	Spacewatch	·	2.9 km	MPC · JPL
433731	2015 AM_{148}	—	November 6, 2008	Mount Lemmon	Mount Lemmon Survey	EOS	1.8 km	MPC · JPL
433732	2015 AZ_{149}	—	January 9, 2006	Mount Lemmon	Mount Lemmon Survey	·	1.8 km	MPC · JPL
433733	2015 AB_{150}	—	February 29, 2004	Kitt Peak	Spacewatch	·	2.0 km	MPC · JPL
433734	2015 AM_{150}	—	August 23, 2004	Kitt Peak	Spacewatch	·	2.0 km	MPC · JPL
433735	2015 AO_{155}	—	March 23, 2001	Kitt Peak	Spacewatch	MAS	650 m	MPC · JPL
433736	2015 AS_{168}	—	February 10, 2002	Socorro	LINEAR	·	680 m	MPC · JPL
433737	2015 AX_{169}	—	December 29, 2003	Kitt Peak	Spacewatch	THM	2.3 km	MPC · JPL
433738	2015 AN_{174}	—	January 27, 2004	Kitt Peak	Spacewatch	·	2.7 km	MPC · JPL
433739	2015 AR_{174}	—	January 25, 2006	Kitt Peak	Spacewatch	·	1.5 km	MPC · JPL
433740	2015 AS_{190}	—	February 10, 2008	Mount Lemmon	Mount Lemmon Survey	MAS	840 m	MPC · JPL
433741	2015 AA_{234}	—	April 18, 2007	Mount Lemmon	Mount Lemmon Survey	·	1.3 km	MPC · JPL
433742	2015 AX_{238}	—	February 17, 2007	Kitt Peak	Spacewatch	·	890 m	MPC · JPL
433743	2015 AA_{240}	—	February 13, 2011	Mount Lemmon	Mount Lemmon Survey	·	2.0 km	MPC · JPL
433744	2015 AE_{256}	—	January 19, 2001	Socorro	LINEAR	·	1.8 km	MPC · JPL
433745	2015 AH_{256}	—	February 17, 2004	Kitt Peak	Spacewatch	·	3.7 km	MPC · JPL
433746	2015 AB_{257}	—	December 12, 1996	Kitt Peak	Spacewatch	·	1.5 km	MPC · JPL
433747	2015 AX_{257}	—	January 26, 2006	Mount Lemmon	Mount Lemmon Survey	·	1.9 km	MPC · JPL
433748	2015 AJ_{263}	—	July 28, 2003	Campo Imperatore	CINEOS	·	750 m	MPC · JPL
433749	2015 AM_{263}	—	May 15, 2004	Campo Imperatore	CINEOS	MAS	790 m	MPC · JPL
433750	2015 AZ_{264}	—	September 24, 2005	Kitt Peak	Spacewatch	·	1.4 km	MPC · JPL
433751	2015 AD_{279}	—	January 25, 2006	Kitt Peak	Spacewatch	·	2.0 km	MPC · JPL
433752	2015 AG_{279}	—	November 11, 2004	Kitt Peak	Spacewatch	·	2.5 km	MPC · JPL
433753	2015 AC_{280}	—	April 2, 2006	Kitt Peak	Spacewatch	·	2.7 km	MPC · JPL
433754	2015 AR_{280}	—	August 27, 2000	Cerro Tololo	Deep Ecliptic Survey	·	1.1 km	MPC · JPL
433755	2015 AS_{280}	—	December 2, 2004	Kitt Peak	Spacewatch	AGN	1.4 km	MPC · JPL
433756	2015 BL_{1}	—	February 25, 2000	Kitt Peak	Spacewatch	·	1.7 km	MPC · JPL
433757	2015 BL_{6}	—	October 16, 2007	Mount Lemmon	Mount Lemmon Survey	·	3.6 km	MPC · JPL
433758	2015 BX_{6}	—	November 7, 2008	Mount Lemmon	Mount Lemmon Survey	·	3.5 km	MPC · JPL
433759	2015 BP_{11}	—	August 10, 2007	Kitt Peak	Spacewatch	·	2.8 km	MPC · JPL
433760	2015 BA_{17}	—	May 4, 2005	Kitt Peak	Spacewatch	·	2.9 km	MPC · JPL
433761	2015 BD_{18}	—	February 8, 2007	Kitt Peak	Spacewatch	·	980 m	MPC · JPL
433762	2015 BV_{24}	—	March 15, 2004	Kitt Peak	Spacewatch	·	1.6 km	MPC · JPL
433763 Helenkirk	2015 BX_{25}	Helenkirk	October 31, 1995	Saanich	D. D. Balam	·	1.3 km	MPC · JPL
433764	2015 BK_{26}	—	November 19, 2003	Kitt Peak	Spacewatch	·	2.3 km	MPC · JPL
433765	2015 BP_{26}	—	September 27, 2006	Kitt Peak	Spacewatch	·	940 m	MPC · JPL
433766	2015 BA_{27}	—	February 9, 2008	Kitt Peak	Spacewatch	·	700 m	MPC · JPL
433767	2015 BP_{27}	—	March 20, 2007	Catalina	CSS	·	1.6 km	MPC · JPL
433768	2015 BB_{32}	—	October 7, 2008	Mount Lemmon	Mount Lemmon Survey	·	2.2 km	MPC · JPL
433769	2015 BH_{33}	—	December 29, 2005	Kitt Peak	Spacewatch	·	1.3 km	MPC · JPL
433770	2015 BU_{44}	—	February 11, 2004	Kitt Peak	Spacewatch	·	1.2 km	MPC · JPL
433771	2015 BE_{58}	—	December 1, 2008	Kitt Peak	Spacewatch	·	2.6 km	MPC · JPL
433772	2015 BK_{59}	—	November 3, 2008	Mount Lemmon	Mount Lemmon Survey	·	2.8 km	MPC · JPL
433773	2015 BM_{60}	—	November 21, 2005	Kitt Peak	Spacewatch	·	3.1 km	MPC · JPL
433774	2015 BE_{62}	—	October 14, 1998	Kitt Peak	Spacewatch	·	1.0 km	MPC · JPL
433775	2015 BQ_{63}	—	December 30, 2005	Mount Lemmon	Mount Lemmon Survey	·	1.8 km	MPC · JPL
433776	2015 BS_{63}	—	June 25, 2010	WISE	WISE	VER	3.6 km	MPC · JPL
433777	2015 BT_{63}	—	January 30, 2004	Kitt Peak	Spacewatch	HYG	3.8 km	MPC · JPL
433778	2015 BJ_{64}	—	March 17, 2001	Kitt Peak	Spacewatch	·	850 m	MPC · JPL
433779	2015 BX_{66}	—	March 4, 2006	Kitt Peak	Spacewatch	AGN	1.1 km	MPC · JPL
433780	2015 BX_{67}	—	February 14, 2010	Mount Lemmon	Mount Lemmon Survey	·	3.7 km	MPC · JPL
433781	2015 BW_{70}	—	October 28, 2005	Kitt Peak	Spacewatch	·	1.3 km	MPC · JPL
433782	2015 BT_{71}	—	February 13, 2010	WISE	WISE	EUN	4.6 km	MPC · JPL
433783	2015 BS_{75}	—	December 1, 2003	Kitt Peak	Spacewatch	·	2.8 km	MPC · JPL
433784	2015 BG_{76}	—	February 21, 2007	Kitt Peak	Spacewatch	(5)	900 m	MPC · JPL
433785	2015 BN_{80}	—	December 16, 2007	Anderson Mesa	LONEOS	·	1.3 km	MPC · JPL
433786	2015 BM_{85}	—	March 17, 2005	Mount Lemmon	Mount Lemmon Survey	(2076)	530 m	MPC · JPL
433787	2015 BG_{86}	—	February 17, 2004	Kitt Peak	Spacewatch	THM	2.2 km	MPC · JPL
433788	2015 BL_{86}	—	January 18, 1998	Kitt Peak	Spacewatch	·	3.2 km	MPC · JPL
433789	2015 BN_{86}	—	January 26, 1998	Kitt Peak	Spacewatch	VER	2.9 km	MPC · JPL
433790	2015 BM_{87}	—	March 3, 2000	Socorro	LINEAR	·	1.1 km	MPC · JPL
433791	2015 BP_{87}	—	October 15, 2004	Mount Lemmon	Mount Lemmon Survey	AST	1.8 km	MPC · JPL
433792	2015 BA_{88}	—	October 2, 2008	Mount Lemmon	Mount Lemmon Survey	KOR	1.5 km	MPC · JPL
433793	2015 BW_{88}	—	November 17, 2006	Mount Lemmon	Mount Lemmon Survey	·	1.2 km	MPC · JPL
433794	2015 BR_{89}	—	March 3, 2005	Catalina	CSS	·	3.7 km	MPC · JPL
433795	2015 BW_{89}	—	December 13, 2004	Kitt Peak	Spacewatch	AGN	1.6 km	MPC · JPL
433796	2015 BJ_{90}	—	December 3, 2007	Kitt Peak	Spacewatch	·	570 m	MPC · JPL
433797	2015 BW_{98}	—	October 25, 2008	Kitt Peak	Spacewatch	·	2.0 km	MPC · JPL
433798	2015 BA_{99}	—	December 22, 2005	Kitt Peak	Spacewatch	·	1.6 km	MPC · JPL
433799	2015 BE_{99}	—	February 12, 2004	Kitt Peak	Spacewatch	·	2.5 km	MPC · JPL
433800	2015 BT_{99}	—	January 30, 2004	Kitt Peak	Spacewatch	NYS	870 m	MPC · JPL

== 433801–433900 ==
back to top

Designation			Discovery			Properties		Ref
Permanent	Provisional	Named after	Date	Site	Discoverer(s)	Category	Diam.	Ref
433801	2015 BF_{100}	—	January 15, 2005	Kitt Peak	Spacewatch	·	670 m	MPC · JPL
433802	2015 BU_{100}	—	December 19, 2003	Kitt Peak	Spacewatch	·	2.8 km	MPC · JPL
433803	2015 BY_{101}	—	May 12, 2007	Mount Lemmon	Mount Lemmon Survey	·	2.8 km	MPC · JPL
433804	2015 BW_{104}	—	January 10, 2008	Mount Lemmon	Mount Lemmon Survey	NYS	800 m	MPC · JPL
433805	2015 BY_{104}	—	December 20, 2004	Mount Lemmon	Mount Lemmon Survey	·	5.1 km	MPC · JPL
433806	2015 BO_{105}	—	May 6, 2005	Catalina	CSS	·	2.4 km	MPC · JPL
433807	2015 BJ_{116}	—	February 8, 2008	Kitt Peak	Spacewatch	·	1.2 km	MPC · JPL
433808	2015 BZ_{118}	—	December 21, 2006	Kitt Peak	Spacewatch	·	1.7 km	MPC · JPL
433809	2015 BD_{119}	—	March 18, 2004	Kitt Peak	Spacewatch	·	1.1 km	MPC · JPL
433810	2015 BF_{119}	—	February 16, 2004	Kitt Peak	Spacewatch	EOS	2.3 km	MPC · JPL
433811	2015 BG_{129}	—	October 26, 2009	Mount Lemmon	Mount Lemmon Survey	·	900 m	MPC · JPL
433812	2015 BZ_{138}	—	September 10, 2007	Kitt Peak	Spacewatch	·	3.5 km	MPC · JPL
433813	2015 BZ_{143}	—	February 13, 2004	Kitt Peak	Spacewatch	·	4.2 km	MPC · JPL
433814	2015 BL_{147}	—	April 12, 2005	Kitt Peak	Spacewatch	·	730 m	MPC · JPL
433815	2015 BX_{147}	—	October 31, 2000	Socorro	LINEAR	·	2.2 km	MPC · JPL
433816	2015 BZ_{159}	—	September 2, 2007	Mount Lemmon	Mount Lemmon Survey	·	4.5 km	MPC · JPL
433817	2015 BT_{162}	—	November 24, 2009	Kitt Peak	Spacewatch	·	2.4 km	MPC · JPL
433818	2015 BH_{164}	—	September 15, 2004	Kitt Peak	Spacewatch	·	2.2 km	MPC · JPL
433819	2015 BN_{173}	—	August 24, 2008	Kitt Peak	Spacewatch	·	2.4 km	MPC · JPL
433820	2015 BD_{177}	—	January 2, 1998	Kitt Peak	Spacewatch	·	4.0 km	MPC · JPL
433821	2015 BH_{180}	—	December 12, 2006	Kitt Peak	Spacewatch	·	1.3 km	MPC · JPL
433822	2015 BH_{182}	—	February 17, 2007	Kitt Peak	Spacewatch	·	1.4 km	MPC · JPL
433823	2015 BW_{185}	—	February 18, 2010	Kitt Peak	Spacewatch	·	2.6 km	MPC · JPL
433824	2015 BF_{195}	—	May 4, 2005	Kitt Peak	Spacewatch	·	2.3 km	MPC · JPL
433825	2015 BK_{195}	—	March 5, 2008	Mount Lemmon	Mount Lemmon Survey	·	1.1 km	MPC · JPL
433826	2015 BU_{198}	—	March 18, 2004	Kitt Peak	Spacewatch	·	1.3 km	MPC · JPL
433827	2015 BW_{200}	—	December 31, 2008	Kitt Peak	Spacewatch	·	2.7 km	MPC · JPL
433828	2015 BY_{200}	—	June 10, 2008	Kitt Peak	Spacewatch	·	1.1 km	MPC · JPL
433829	2015 BK_{205}	—	December 1, 2005	Mount Lemmon	Mount Lemmon Survey	·	1.6 km	MPC · JPL
433830	2015 BR_{221}	—	November 29, 2000	Kitt Peak	Spacewatch	PAD	1.9 km	MPC · JPL
433831	2015 BV_{240}	—	October 11, 2004	Kitt Peak	Spacewatch	(12739)	1.6 km	MPC · JPL
433832	2015 BU_{243}	—	December 21, 2008	Mount Lemmon	Mount Lemmon Survey	·	3.1 km	MPC · JPL
433833	2015 BB_{245}	—	June 29, 1995	Kitt Peak	Spacewatch	·	3.7 km	MPC · JPL
433834	2015 BQ_{245}	—	December 18, 2003	Kitt Peak	Spacewatch	EOS	2.4 km	MPC · JPL
433835	2015 BL_{248}	—	November 9, 2008	Kitt Peak	Spacewatch	·	1.8 km	MPC · JPL
433836	2015 BO_{248}	—	May 21, 2012	Mount Lemmon	Mount Lemmon Survey	·	2.1 km	MPC · JPL
433837	2015 BG_{249}	—	March 9, 2005	Kitt Peak	Spacewatch	KOR	1.6 km	MPC · JPL
433838	2015 BO_{249}	—	March 3, 2000	Kitt Peak	Spacewatch	MAS	820 m	MPC · JPL
433839	2015 BM_{250}	—	February 27, 2000	Kitt Peak	Spacewatch	·	1.7 km	MPC · JPL
433840	2015 BU_{250}	—	February 14, 2004	Kitt Peak	Spacewatch	MAS	640 m	MPC · JPL
433841	2015 BS_{251}	—	January 27, 2007	Kitt Peak	Spacewatch	·	1.2 km	MPC · JPL
433842	2015 BO_{252}	—	September 2, 2008	Kitt Peak	Spacewatch	AGN	1.3 km	MPC · JPL
433843	2015 BA_{253}	—	May 14, 2010	WISE	WISE	·	2.3 km	MPC · JPL
433844	2015 BP_{261}	—	September 24, 2008	Kitt Peak	Spacewatch	KOR	1.3 km	MPC · JPL
433845	2015 BZ_{261}	—	January 15, 2004	Kitt Peak	Spacewatch	·	2.3 km	MPC · JPL
433846	2015 BM_{262}	—	April 11, 2003	Kitt Peak	Spacewatch	·	1.3 km	MPC · JPL
433847	2015 BQ_{269}	—	January 27, 2007	Mount Lemmon	Mount Lemmon Survey	·	950 m	MPC · JPL
433848	2015 BH_{272}	—	April 1, 2005	Kitt Peak	Spacewatch	·	2.8 km	MPC · JPL
433849	2015 BJ_{272}	—	September 7, 2008	Mount Lemmon	Mount Lemmon Survey	AST	2.0 km	MPC · JPL
433850	2015 BJ_{274}	—	January 27, 2006	Kitt Peak	Spacewatch	ADE	2.2 km	MPC · JPL
433851	2015 BK_{274}	—	November 23, 2003	Kitt Peak	Spacewatch	·	1.8 km	MPC · JPL
433852	2015 BO_{274}	—	June 2, 2010	WISE	WISE	·	3.4 km	MPC · JPL
433853	2015 BF_{276}	—	November 20, 2008	Mount Lemmon	Mount Lemmon Survey	KOR	1.4 km	MPC · JPL
433854	2015 BO_{276}	—	January 29, 2009	Mount Lemmon	Mount Lemmon Survey	·	4.2 km	MPC · JPL
433855	2015 BD_{277}	—	February 27, 2006	Kitt Peak	Spacewatch	AGN	1.4 km	MPC · JPL
433856	2015 BS_{277}	—	March 12, 2007	Kitt Peak	Spacewatch	·	1.2 km	MPC · JPL
433857	2015 BX_{278}	—	February 11, 2004	Anderson Mesa	LONEOS	·	3.9 km	MPC · JPL
433858	2015 BY_{278}	—	February 2, 2000	Kitt Peak	Spacewatch	·	1.1 km	MPC · JPL
433859	2015 BD_{290}	—	February 19, 2004	Socorro	LINEAR	·	3.1 km	MPC · JPL
433860	2015 BP_{291}	—	January 22, 2010	WISE	WISE	·	1.3 km	MPC · JPL
433861	2015 BT_{291}	—	March 15, 2010	Mount Lemmon	Mount Lemmon Survey	THM	2.0 km	MPC · JPL
433862	2015 BV_{291}	—	October 4, 2007	Catalina	CSS	·	2.4 km	MPC · JPL
433863	2015 BQ_{292}	—	December 22, 1995	Kitt Peak	Spacewatch	NYS	960 m	MPC · JPL
433864	2015 BS_{293}	—	September 9, 2008	Mount Lemmon	Mount Lemmon Survey	·	2.7 km	MPC · JPL
433865	2015 BT_{294}	—	December 12, 2004	Kitt Peak	Spacewatch	·	4.0 km	MPC · JPL
433866	2015 BV_{296}	—	March 29, 1997	Xinglong	SCAP	PHO	1.5 km	MPC · JPL
433867	2015 BP_{298}	—	May 23, 2007	Mount Lemmon	Mount Lemmon Survey	·	2.0 km	MPC · JPL
433868	2015 BL_{301}	—	February 28, 2006	Catalina	CSS	·	2.0 km	MPC · JPL
433869	2015 BO_{307}	—	February 13, 2004	Kitt Peak	Spacewatch	·	3.8 km	MPC · JPL
433870	2015 BU_{307}	—	August 9, 2013	Kitt Peak	Spacewatch	EUN	940 m	MPC · JPL
433871	2015 BE_{308}	—	October 21, 2006	Mount Lemmon	Mount Lemmon Survey	NYS	1.1 km	MPC · JPL
433872	2015 BP_{309}	—	December 9, 2004	Kitt Peak	Spacewatch	·	770 m	MPC · JPL
433873	2015 BQ_{311}	—	April 14, 2004	Kitt Peak	Spacewatch	T_{j} (2.76) · centaur · unusual	20 km	MPC · JPL
433874	2015 BL_{319}	—	May 1, 2006	Kitt Peak	Spacewatch	·	1.7 km	MPC · JPL
433875	2015 BA_{324}	—	April 22, 2007	Mount Lemmon	Mount Lemmon Survey	·	1.8 km	MPC · JPL
433876	2015 BQ_{324}	—	November 15, 2006	Kitt Peak	Spacewatch	V	720 m	MPC · JPL
433877	2015 BL_{325}	—	September 10, 2007	Kitt Peak	Spacewatch	·	3.0 km	MPC · JPL
433878	2015 BY_{329}	—	October 7, 2004	Kitt Peak	Spacewatch	·	1.9 km	MPC · JPL
433879	2015 BT_{338}	—	March 3, 2006	Mount Lemmon	Mount Lemmon Survey	·	2.0 km	MPC · JPL
433880	2015 BG_{341}	—	December 19, 2004	Mount Lemmon	Mount Lemmon Survey	·	3.0 km	MPC · JPL
433881	2015 BD_{342}	—	October 31, 2010	Kitt Peak	Spacewatch	·	620 m	MPC · JPL
433882	2015 BY_{353}	—	October 15, 2004	Mount Lemmon	Mount Lemmon Survey	·	2.5 km	MPC · JPL
433883	2015 BC_{356}	—	January 31, 1995	Kitt Peak	Spacewatch	·	2.0 km	MPC · JPL
433884	2015 BQ_{356}	—	February 9, 2010	Kitt Peak	Spacewatch	·	2.4 km	MPC · JPL
433885	2015 BM_{359}	—	November 3, 2005	Mount Lemmon	Mount Lemmon Survey	·	1.1 km	MPC · JPL
433886	2015 BG_{391}	—	October 17, 2006	Mount Lemmon	Mount Lemmon Survey	MAS	650 m	MPC · JPL
433887	2015 BC_{395}	—	December 6, 2005	Kitt Peak	Spacewatch	·	2.8 km	MPC · JPL
433888	2015 BC_{396}	—	June 4, 2005	Kitt Peak	Spacewatch	·	3.2 km	MPC · JPL
433889	2015 BC_{401}	—	December 11, 2004	Kitt Peak	Spacewatch	·	530 m	MPC · JPL
433890	2015 BO_{404}	—	December 24, 2005	Kitt Peak	Spacewatch	·	1.4 km	MPC · JPL
433891	2015 BY_{404}	—	March 8, 2005	Kitt Peak	Spacewatch	EOS	1.7 km	MPC · JPL
433892	2015 BX_{407}	—	January 22, 2006	Mount Lemmon	Mount Lemmon Survey	·	1.8 km	MPC · JPL
433893	2015 BZ_{409}	—	September 2, 2008	Kitt Peak	Spacewatch	·	2.0 km	MPC · JPL
433894	2015 BZ_{415}	—	March 9, 2005	Mount Lemmon	Mount Lemmon Survey	·	1.6 km	MPC · JPL
433895	2015 BY_{421}	—	April 5, 2000	Kitt Peak	Spacewatch	NYS	1.2 km	MPC · JPL
433896	2015 BN_{422}	—	March 13, 2007	Kitt Peak	Spacewatch	·	1.6 km	MPC · JPL
433897	2015 BC_{424}	—	March 17, 2005	Kitt Peak	Spacewatch	·	2.3 km	MPC · JPL
433898	2015 BG_{429}	—	December 14, 2004	Kitt Peak	Spacewatch	AGN	1.5 km	MPC · JPL
433899	2015 BW_{438}	—	March 9, 2005	Mount Lemmon	Mount Lemmon Survey	·	1.5 km	MPC · JPL
433900	2015 BJ_{439}	—	February 11, 2004	Kitt Peak	Spacewatch	THM	2.1 km	MPC · JPL

== 433901–434000 ==
back to top

Designation			Discovery			Properties		Ref
Permanent	Provisional	Named after	Date	Site	Discoverer(s)	Category	Diam.	Ref
433901	2015 BN_{440}	—	March 12, 2007	Kitt Peak	Spacewatch	·	1.2 km	MPC · JPL
433902	2015 BN_{444}	—	November 4, 2004	Socorro	LINEAR	·	2.7 km	MPC · JPL
433903	2015 BA_{450}	—	December 5, 2008	Mount Lemmon	Mount Lemmon Survey	·	3.3 km	MPC · JPL
433904	2015 BB_{454}	—	October 1, 2003	Kitt Peak	Spacewatch	·	1.8 km	MPC · JPL
433905	2015 BC_{455}	—	January 27, 2006	Kitt Peak	Spacewatch	·	2.0 km	MPC · JPL
433906	2015 BT_{460}	—	December 18, 2009	Mount Lemmon	Mount Lemmon Survey	(13314)	2.2 km	MPC · JPL
433907	2015 BB_{462}	—	April 24, 2007	Kitt Peak	Spacewatch	·	2.2 km	MPC · JPL
433908	2015 BW_{467}	—	August 9, 2013	Catalina	CSS	H	540 m	MPC · JPL
433909	2015 BP_{468}	—	October 11, 2007	Kitt Peak	Spacewatch	·	2.9 km	MPC · JPL
433910	2015 BE_{469}	—	February 2, 2005	Kitt Peak	Spacewatch	·	2.0 km	MPC · JPL
433911	2015 BE_{482}	—	October 18, 2009	Mount Lemmon	Mount Lemmon Survey	MIS	2.3 km	MPC · JPL
433912	2015 BO_{493}	—	January 16, 2005	Kitt Peak	Spacewatch	·	800 m	MPC · JPL
433913	2015 BL_{497}	—	July 22, 1995	Kitt Peak	Spacewatch	·	1.6 km	MPC · JPL
433914	2015 BX_{497}	—	November 22, 2005	Kitt Peak	Spacewatch	·	970 m	MPC · JPL
433915	2015 BB_{498}	—	February 12, 2004	Kitt Peak	Spacewatch	·	2.9 km	MPC · JPL
433916	2015 BE_{498}	—	February 2, 2005	Kitt Peak	Spacewatch	·	620 m	MPC · JPL
433917	2015 BQ_{507}	—	September 12, 2007	Mount Lemmon	Mount Lemmon Survey	·	2.2 km	MPC · JPL
433918	2015 BN_{508}	—	April 26, 1993	Kitt Peak	Spacewatch	·	640 m	MPC · JPL
433919	2015 BZ_{511}	—	June 17, 2006	Kitt Peak	Spacewatch	EOS	2.5 km	MPC · JPL
433920	2015 BG_{512}	—	October 2, 2008	Mount Lemmon	Mount Lemmon Survey	KOR	1.8 km	MPC · JPL
433921	2015 CM_{1}	—	July 6, 1997	Kitt Peak	Spacewatch	KOR	1.6 km	MPC · JPL
433922	2015 CP_{1}	—	October 1, 2003	Kitt Peak	Spacewatch	·	740 m	MPC · JPL
433923	2015 CU_{1}	—	February 20, 2006	Catalina	CSS	·	1.8 km	MPC · JPL
433924	2015 CX_{1}	—	December 24, 2005	Kitt Peak	Spacewatch	·	1.3 km	MPC · JPL
433925	2015 CX_{2}	—	September 2, 2013	Mount Lemmon	Mount Lemmon Survey	NYS	1.2 km	MPC · JPL
433926	2015 CZ_{3}	—	February 20, 2006	Mount Lemmon	Mount Lemmon Survey	·	2.5 km	MPC · JPL
433927	2015 CL_{4}	—	February 17, 2004	Kitt Peak	Spacewatch	·	2.8 km	MPC · JPL
433928	2015 CO_{4}	—	February 29, 2004	Kitt Peak	Spacewatch	·	1.1 km	MPC · JPL
433929	2015 CZ_{8}	—	September 26, 2008	Kitt Peak	Spacewatch	·	1.7 km	MPC · JPL
433930	2015 CC_{18}	—	March 15, 2004	Kitt Peak	Spacewatch	·	1.3 km	MPC · JPL
433931	2015 CS_{20}	—	October 5, 2002	Kitt Peak	Spacewatch	·	2.5 km	MPC · JPL
433932	2015 CQ_{22}	—	August 24, 2001	Kitt Peak	Spacewatch	·	3.8 km	MPC · JPL
433933	2015 CB_{23}	—	May 4, 2005	Catalina	CSS	·	2.9 km	MPC · JPL
433934	2015 CP_{32}	—	February 14, 2002	Kitt Peak	Spacewatch	·	1.6 km	MPC · JPL
433935	2015 CJ_{56}	—	March 10, 2002	Kitt Peak	Spacewatch	·	1.8 km	MPC · JPL
433936	2015 DX_{75}	—	February 16, 2004	Kitt Peak	Spacewatch	THM	2.0 km	MPC · JPL
433937	4216 P-L	—	September 24, 1960	Palomar	C. J. van Houten, I. van Houten-Groeneveld, T. Gehrels	·	2.4 km	MPC · JPL
433938	1994 UN_{10}	—	October 29, 1994	Kitt Peak	Spacewatch	H	540 m	MPC · JPL
433939	1995 DW_{1}	—	February 25, 1995	Kitt Peak	Spacewatch	APO	210 m	MPC · JPL
433940	1995 QX_{9}	—	August 18, 1995	Siding Spring	R. H. McNaught	·	1.4 km	MPC · JPL
433941	1995 SK_{10}	—	September 17, 1995	Kitt Peak	Spacewatch	·	2.1 km	MPC · JPL
433942	1995 SY_{11}	—	September 18, 1995	Kitt Peak	Spacewatch	·	1.1 km	MPC · JPL
433943	1995 SR_{39}	—	September 25, 1995	Kitt Peak	Spacewatch	·	1.4 km	MPC · JPL
433944	1995 SR_{52}	—	September 29, 1995	Kitt Peak	Spacewatch	V	570 m	MPC · JPL
433945	1995 SU_{76}	—	September 20, 1995	Kitt Peak	Spacewatch	·	1.2 km	MPC · JPL
433946	1995 UP_{9}	—	October 16, 1995	Kitt Peak	Spacewatch	·	1.8 km	MPC · JPL
433947	1995 UZ_{12}	—	October 17, 1995	Kitt Peak	Spacewatch	·	2.1 km	MPC · JPL
433948	1996 AF_{7}	—	January 12, 1996	Kitt Peak	Spacewatch	·	1.1 km	MPC · JPL
433949	1996 MG	—	June 17, 1996	Kitt Peak	Spacewatch	H	500 m	MPC · JPL
433950	1997 HK_{2}	—	April 29, 1997	Kitt Peak	Spacewatch	·	1.6 km	MPC · JPL
433951	1997 HM_{12}	—	April 30, 1997	Socorro	LINEAR	·	2.6 km	MPC · JPL
433952	1997 WW_{6}	—	November 23, 1997	Kitt Peak	Spacewatch	·	2.0 km	MPC · JPL
433953	1997 XR_{2}	—	December 4, 1997	Socorro	LINEAR	APO · PHA	260 m	MPC · JPL
433954	1998 HD_{136}	—	April 20, 1998	Socorro	LINEAR	·	3.3 km	MPC · JPL
433955	1998 RM_{9}	—	September 13, 1998	Kitt Peak	Spacewatch	·	970 m	MPC · JPL
433956	1998 SH_{155}	—	September 26, 1998	Socorro	LINEAR	·	1.9 km	MPC · JPL
433957	1998 VF_{19}	—	November 10, 1998	Socorro	LINEAR	·	1.5 km	MPC · JPL
433958	1998 VN_{41}	—	November 14, 1998	Kitt Peak	Spacewatch	·	3.0 km	MPC · JPL
433959	1999 FQ_{19}	—	March 22, 1999	Socorro	LINEAR	·	1.5 km	MPC · JPL
433960	1999 JU_{6}	—	May 12, 1999	Socorro	LINEAR	AMO	370 m	MPC · JPL
433961	1999 RL_{41}	—	September 13, 1999	Socorro	LINEAR	T_{j} (2.91)	1.9 km	MPC · JPL
433962	1999 RE_{206}	—	September 8, 1999	Socorro	LINEAR	·	4.2 km	MPC · JPL
433963	1999 RC_{253}	—	September 8, 1999	Socorro	LINEAR	·	1.3 km	MPC · JPL
433964	1999 RG_{259}	—	September 14, 1999	Socorro	LINEAR	·	1.9 km	MPC · JPL
433965	1999 SD_{10}	—	June 15, 1999	Socorro	LINEAR	T_{j} (2.98)	1.8 km	MPC · JPL
433966	1999 TV_{29}	—	October 4, 1999	Socorro	LINEAR	·	1.5 km	MPC · JPL
433967	1999 TK_{49}	—	October 4, 1999	Kitt Peak	Spacewatch	·	1.7 km	MPC · JPL
433968	1999 TY_{57}	—	October 6, 1999	Kitt Peak	Spacewatch	·	1.0 km	MPC · JPL
433969	1999 TD_{73}	—	October 10, 1999	Kitt Peak	Spacewatch	·	4.2 km	MPC · JPL
433970	1999 TS_{115}	—	October 4, 1999	Socorro	LINEAR	·	1.2 km	MPC · JPL
433971	1999 TT_{129}	—	October 6, 1999	Socorro	LINEAR	·	900 m	MPC · JPL
433972	1999 TT_{153}	—	October 7, 1999	Socorro	LINEAR	·	1.7 km	MPC · JPL
433973	1999 TQ_{218}	—	October 15, 1999	Socorro	LINEAR	·	1.9 km	MPC · JPL
433974	1999 TX_{261}	—	October 13, 1999	Socorro	LINEAR	·	1.3 km	MPC · JPL
433975	1999 TZ_{317}	—	October 12, 1999	Kitt Peak	Spacewatch	·	1.9 km	MPC · JPL
433976	1999 UV_{14}	—	October 29, 1999	Catalina	CSS	·	1.8 km	MPC · JPL
433977	1999 UU_{49}	—	October 3, 1999	Catalina	CSS	·	2.1 km	MPC · JPL
433978	1999 VS_{41}	—	October 9, 1999	Socorro	LINEAR	EUN	1.4 km	MPC · JPL
433979	1999 VM_{64}	—	November 4, 1999	Socorro	LINEAR	·	1.7 km	MPC · JPL
433980	1999 VN_{88}	—	November 4, 1999	Socorro	LINEAR	·	1.6 km	MPC · JPL
433981	1999 VP_{141}	—	November 10, 1999	Kitt Peak	Spacewatch	WIT	1 km	MPC · JPL
433982	1999 VN_{155}	—	November 9, 1999	Socorro	LINEAR	·	1.8 km	MPC · JPL
433983	1999 VB_{161}	—	November 14, 1999	Socorro	LINEAR	(5)	1.3 km	MPC · JPL
433984	1999 VK_{206}	—	November 12, 1999	Socorro	LINEAR	·	2.1 km	MPC · JPL
433985	1999 XT_{139}	—	December 2, 1999	Kitt Peak	Spacewatch	·	1.4 km	MPC · JPL
433986	1999 XB_{236}	—	October 8, 1999	Socorro	LINEAR	·	500 m	MPC · JPL
433987	1999 XR_{252}	—	December 12, 1999	Kitt Peak	Spacewatch	·	1.9 km	MPC · JPL
433988	1999 YK_{23}	—	December 9, 1999	Kitt Peak	Spacewatch	·	600 m	MPC · JPL
433989	2000 AZ_{213}	—	January 6, 2000	Kitt Peak	Spacewatch	L4	8.8 km	MPC · JPL
433990	2000 EX_{188}	—	February 11, 2000	Kitt Peak	Spacewatch	·	1.2 km	MPC · JPL
433991	2000 GR_{97}	—	March 29, 2000	Socorro	LINEAR	·	1.5 km	MPC · JPL
433992	2000 HD_{74}	—	April 30, 2000	Anderson Mesa	LONEOS	T_{j} (2.57) · AMO +1km	830 m	MPC · JPL
433993	2000 LY_{23}	—	June 8, 2000	Socorro	LINEAR	·	2.2 km	MPC · JPL
433994	2000 QH_{94}	—	August 26, 2000	Socorro	LINEAR	·	3.5 km	MPC · JPL
433995	2000 RK_{106}	—	September 4, 2000	Anderson Mesa	LONEOS	·	2.5 km	MPC · JPL
433996	2000 SA_{9}	—	September 23, 2000	Socorro	LINEAR	·	2.0 km	MPC · JPL
433997	2000 SH_{52}	—	September 23, 2000	Socorro	LINEAR	·	550 m	MPC · JPL
433998	2000 SS_{91}	—	September 23, 2000	Socorro	LINEAR	·	2.9 km	MPC · JPL
433999	2000 SZ_{199}	—	September 24, 2000	Socorro	LINEAR	·	1.4 km	MPC · JPL
434000	2000 SZ_{223}	—	September 27, 2000	Socorro	LINEAR	·	1.2 km	MPC · JPL

back to top

== Meaning of names ==
As minor planet discoveries are confirmed, they are given a permanent number by the IAU's Minor Planet Center (MPC), and the discoverers can then submit names for them, following the IAU's naming conventions. The list below concerns those minor planets in the specified number-range that have received names, and explains the meanings of those names.

Official naming citations of newly named small Solar System bodies are approved and published in a bulletin by IAU's Working Group for Small Bodies Nomenclature (WGSBN). Before May 2021, citations were published in MPC's Minor Planet Circulars for many decades. Recent citations can also be found on the JPL Small-Body Database (SBDB). Until his death in 2016, German astronomer Lutz D. Schmadel compiled these citations into the Dictionary of Minor Planet Names (DMP) and regularly updated the collection.

Based on Paul Herget's The Names of the Minor Planets, Schmadel also researched the unclear origin of numerous asteroids, most of which had been named prior to World War II. This article incorporates text from this source, which is in the public domain: SBDB New namings may only be added to this list below after official publication as the preannouncement of names is condemned. The WGSBN publishes a comprehensive guideline for the naming rules of non-cometary small Solar System bodies.

Named minor planet	Provisional	This minor planet was named for...	Ref · Catalog
433512 Hollyholman	2013 WE_{55}	Holly Holman (born 1973) is a biomedical engineer, researcher and educator at the University of Utah. She has worked on vaccine development and dormant DNA viruses in neurons. She discovered a new type of cell in the vestibular system called clinocyte.	IAU · 433512
433763 Helenkirk	2015 BX_{25}	Helen Kirk, Canadian Senior Research Officer at the Herzberg Astronomy and Astrophysics Institute of the National Research Council of Canada.	IAU · 433763
